= List of birds of Honduras =

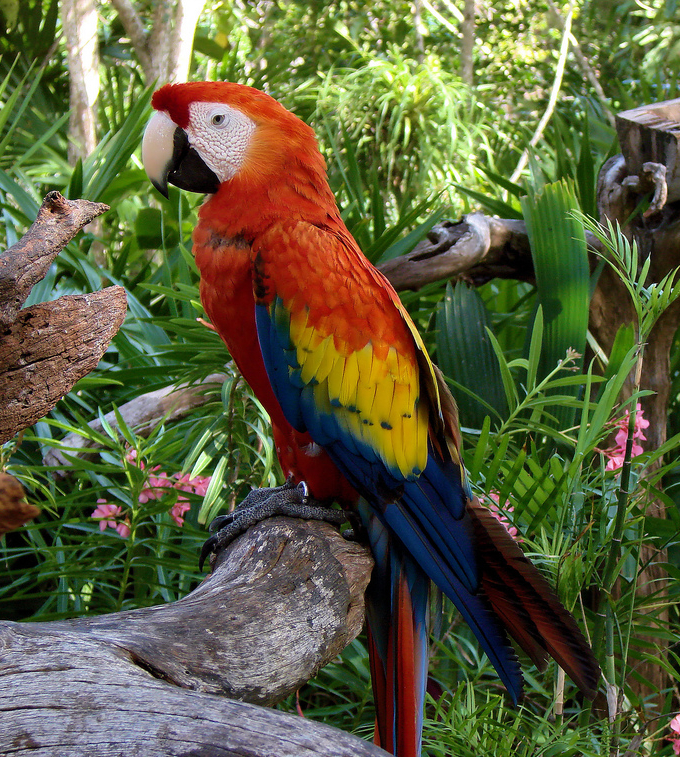
The scarlet macaw is the national bird of Honduras.

The birds of Honduras included a total of 798 species as of June 2023, according to La Asociación Hondureña de Ornitología (ASHO). Between that date and August 2021, an additional 30 species have been added from Bird Checklists of the World and one as a result of a split.

Of the 797 species listed here, one of them, the Honduran emerald, is endemic. Fifty-four are rare or accidental and five have been introduced by humans. Five species are hypothetical (see below) and a few have insufficient information to classify. Some of the "hypothetical" species have more recent eBird records with photographs. Two species have possibly been extirpated. Sixteen species are globally vulnerable or endangered.

This list is presented in the taxonomic sequence of the Check-list of North and Middle American Birds, 7th edition through the 63rd Supplement, published by the American Ornithological Society (AOS). Common and scientific names are also those of the Check-list, except that the common names of families are from the Clements taxonomy because the AOS list does not include them.

Unless otherwise noted, the species on this list are considered to occur regularly in Honduras as permanent residents, summer or winter visitors, or migrants. The following tags are used by ASHO to highlight several categories of occurrence.

- (A) Accidental - a species that rarely or accidentally occurs in Honduras
- (E) Endemic - a species endemic to Honduras
- (I) Introduced - a species introduced to Honduras as a consequence, direct or indirect, of human actions
- (H) Hypothetical - a species recorded but with no tangible evidence such as a photograph, according to the ASHO
- (?) Insufficient information - appended to a tag or note because of uncertainty

== Tinamous ==
Order: Tinamiformes Family: Tinamidae

The tinamous are one of the most ancient groups of bird. Although they look similar to other ground-dwelling birds like quail and grouse, they are not related to these birds as they are palaeognaths, and are classified as a single family, Tinamidae, within their own order, the Tinamiformes. They are related to the ratites, such as rheas, emu, and kiwi.

- Great tinamou, Tinamus major (near-threatened)
- Little tinamou, Crypturellus soui
- Thicket tinamou, Crypturellus cinnamomeus
- Slaty-breasted tinamou, Crypturellus boucardi

== Ducks, geese, and waterfowl ==
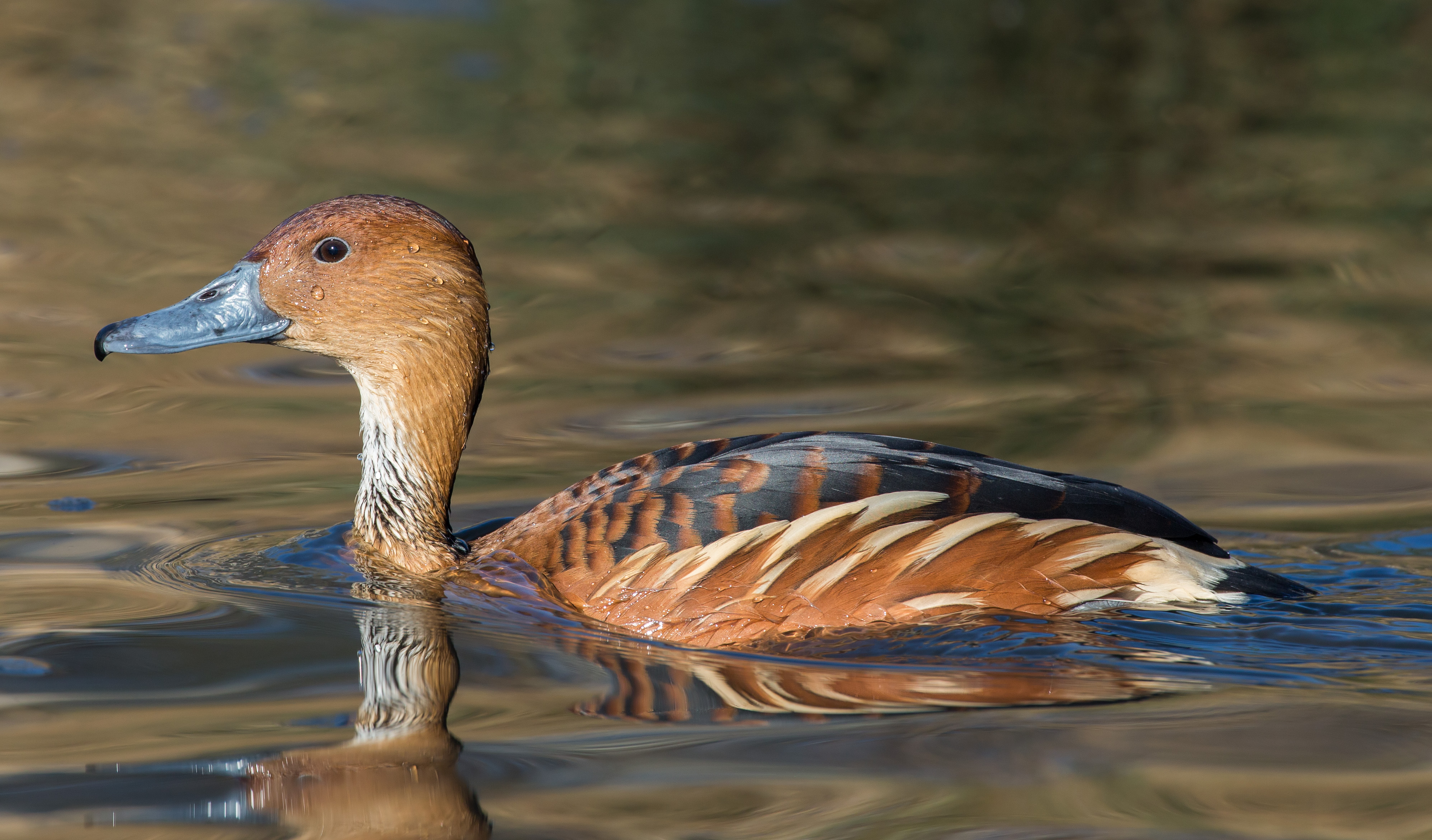
Fulvous whistling-duck

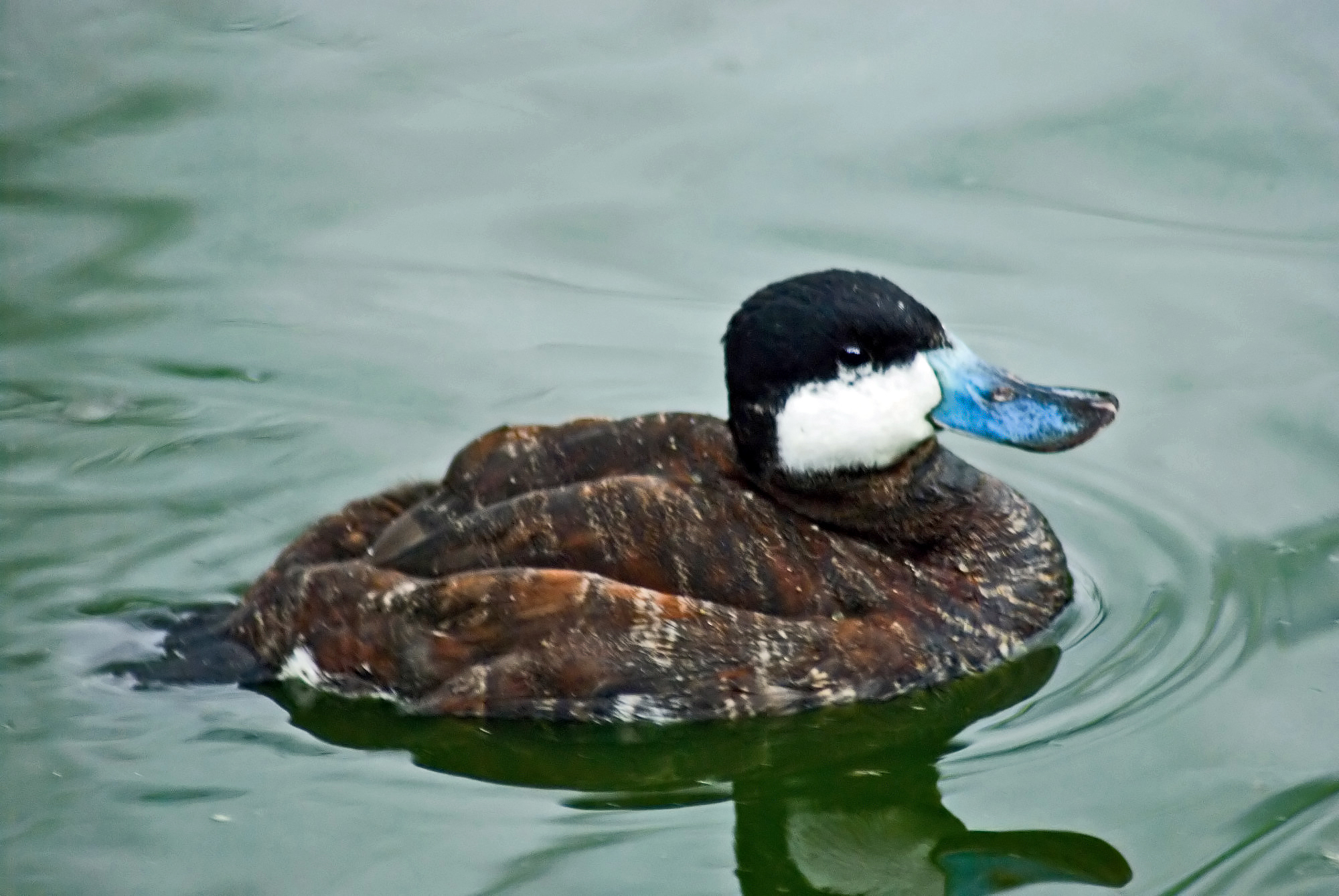
Ruddy duck

Order: Anseriformes Family: Anatidae

The family Anatidae includes the ducks and most duck-like waterfowl, such as geese and swans. These are birds adapted to an aquatic existence with webbed feet, flattened bills, and feathers that are excellent at shedding water due to an oily coating.

- Black-bellied whistling-duck, Dendrocygna autumnalis
- Fulvous whistling-duck, Dendrocygna bicolor
- Snow goose, Anser caerulescens (A)
- Brant, Branta bernicla (A)
- Canada goose, Branta canadensis (A?) (H?)
- Muscovy duck, Cairina moschata
- Blue-winged teal, Spatula discors
- Cinnamon teal, Spatula cyanoptera
- Northern shoveler, Spatula clypeata
- Gadwall, Mareca strepera (A)
- American wigeon, Mareca americana
- Mallard, Anas platyrhynchos (A)
- White-cheeked pintail, Anas bahamensis (A)
- Northern pintail, Anas acuta
- Green-winged teal, Anas crecca
- Canvasback, Aythya valisineria
- Redhead, Aythya americana (A)
- Ring-necked duck, Aythya collaris
- Lesser scaup, Aythya affinis
- Red-breasted merganser, Mergus serrator (A)
- Masked duck, Nomonyx dominicus
- Ruddy duck, Oxyura jamaicensis

== Guans, chachalacas, and curassows ==
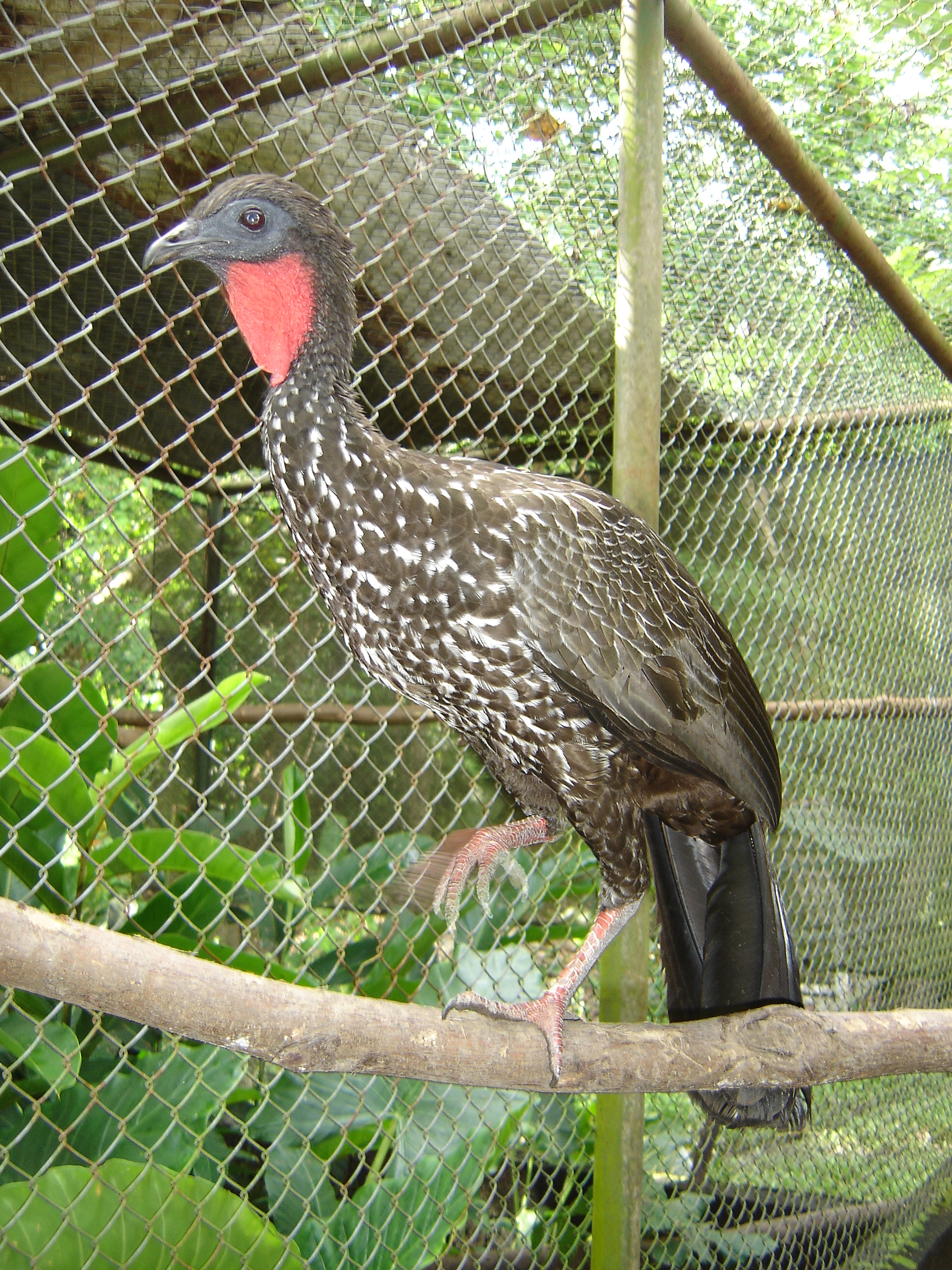
Crested guan

Order: Galliformes Family: Cracidae

The Cracidae are large birds, similar in general appearance to turkeys. The guans and curassows live in trees, but the smaller chachalacas are found in more open scrubby habitats. They are generally dull-plumaged, but the curassows and some guans have colorful facial ornaments.

- Plain chachalaca, Ortalis vetula
- Gray-headed chachalaca, Ortalis cinereiceps
- White-bellied chachalaca, Ortalis leucogastra
- Crested guan, Penelope purpurascens
- Highland guan, Penelopina nigra (vulnerable)
- Great curassow, Crax rubra (vulnerable)

== New World quail ==
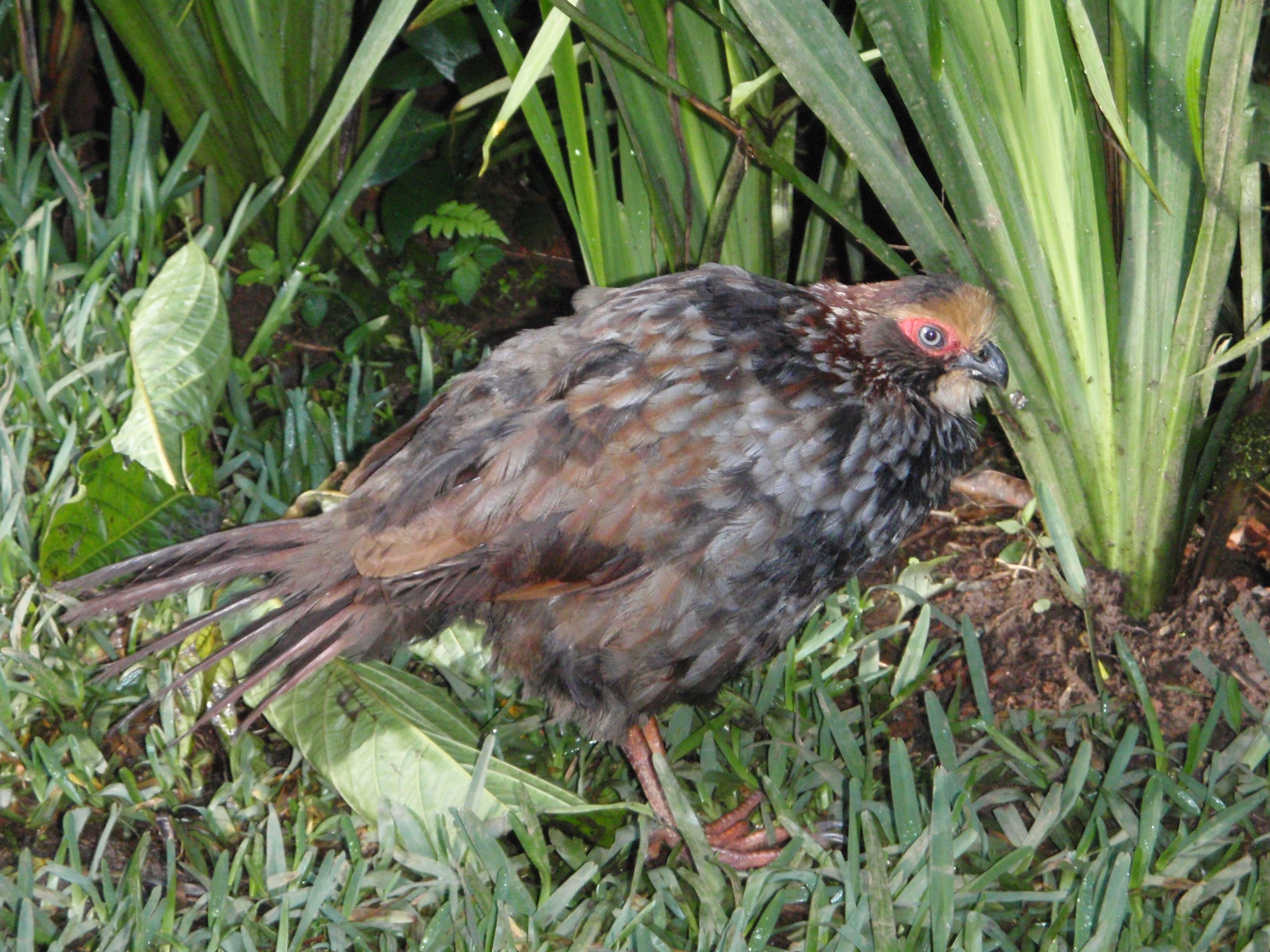
Buffy-crowned wood-partridge

Order: Galliformes Family: Odontophoridae

The New World quails are small, plump terrestrial birds only distantly related to the quails of the Old World, but named for their similar appearance and habits.

- Tawny-faced quail, Rhynchortyx cinctus
- Buffy-crowned wood-partridge, Dendrortyx leucophrys
- Black-throated bobwhite, Colinus nigrogularis
- Crested bobwhite, Colinus cristatus
- Ocellated quail, Cyrtonyx ocellatus (vulnerable)
- Singing quail, Dactylortyx thoracicus
- Black-eared wood-quail, Odontophorus melanotis
- Spotted wood-quail, Odontophorus guttatus

== Flamingos ==
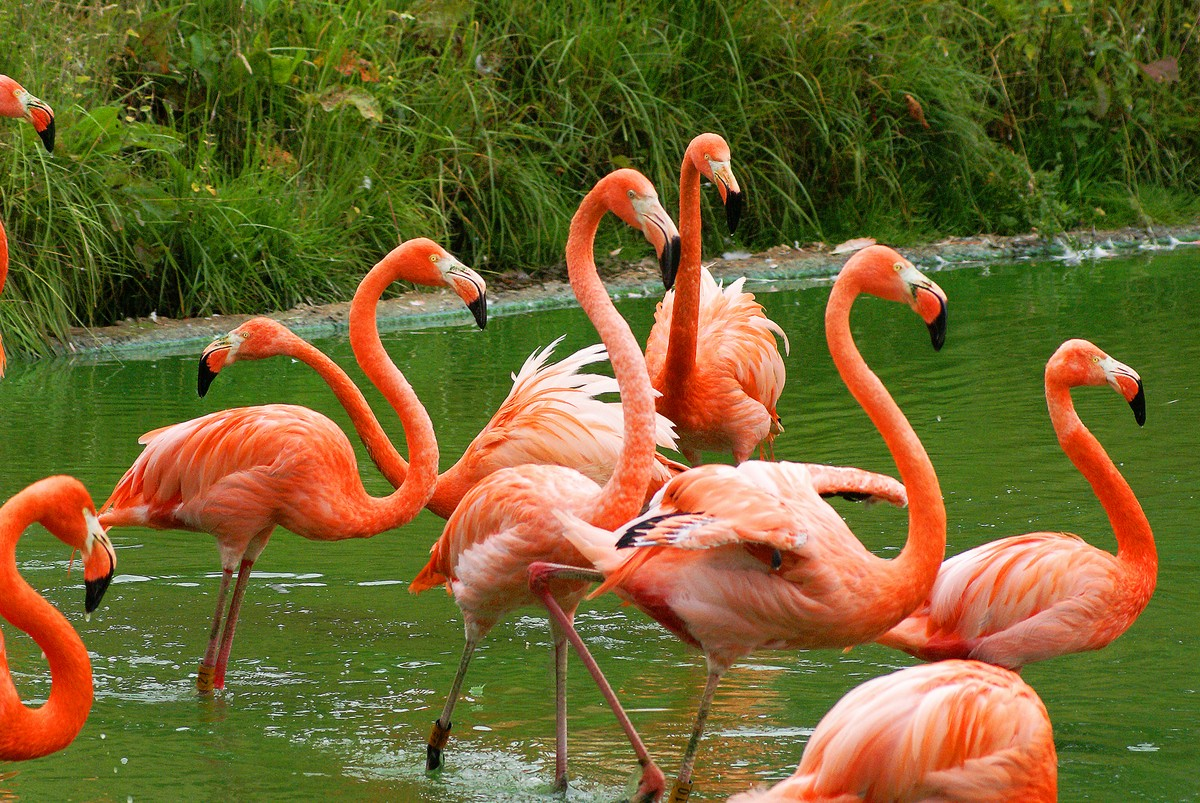
American flamingo

Order: Phoenicopteriformes Family: Phoenicopteridae

Flamingos are gregarious wading birds, usually 3 to 5 feet (0.9 to 1.5 m) tall, found in both the Western and Eastern Hemispheres. Flamingos filter-feed on shellfish and algae. Their oddly shaped beaks are specially adapted to separate mud and silt from the food they consume and, uniquely, are used upside-down.

- American flamingo, Phoenicopterus ruber (A?) (H?)

== Grebes ==
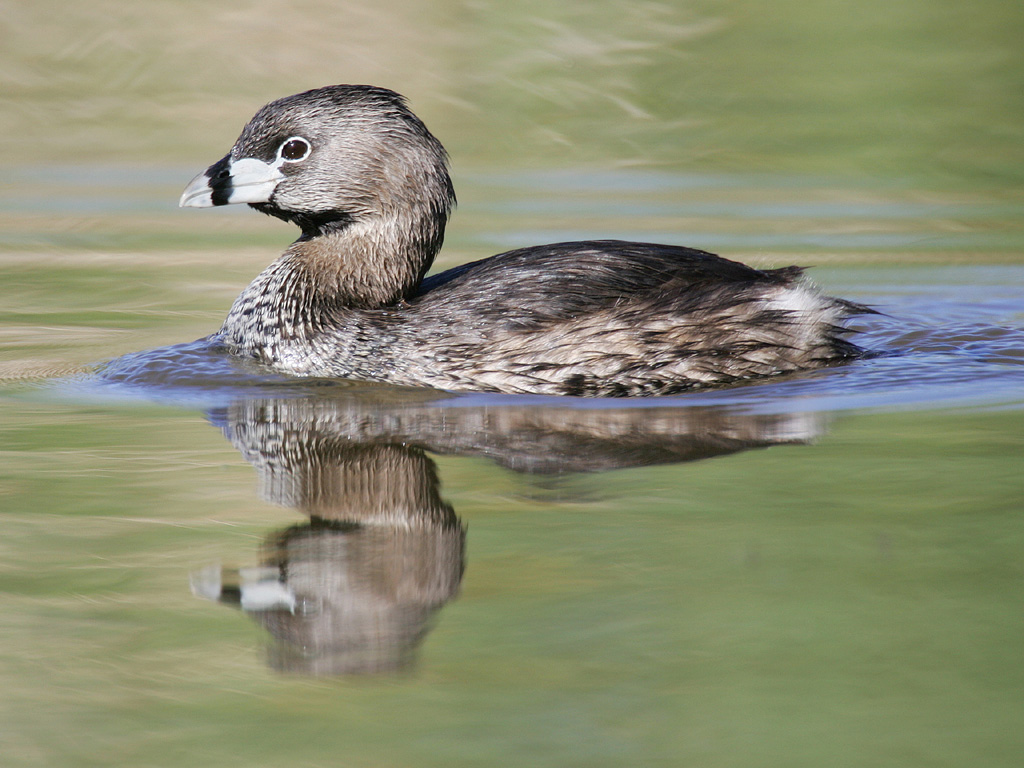
Pied-billed grebe

Order: Podicipediformes Family: Podicipedidae

Grebes are small to medium-large freshwater diving birds. They have lobed toes and are excellent swimmers and divers. However, they have their feet placed far back on the body, making them quite ungainly on land.

- Least grebe, Tachybaptus dominicus
- Pied-billed grebe, Podilymbus podiceps

== Pigeons and doves ==
Order: Columbiformes Family: Columbidae

Pigeons and doves are stout-bodied birds with short necks and short slender bills with a fleshy cere.

- Rock pigeon, Columba livia (I)
- Pale-vented pigeon, Patagioenas cayennensis
- Scaled pigeon, Patagioenas speciosa
- White-crowned pigeon, Patagioenas leucocephala (near-threatened)
- Red-billed pigeon, Patagioenas flavirostris
- Band-tailed pigeon, Patagioenas fasciata
- Short-billed pigeon, Patagioenas nigrirostris
- Eurasian collared-dove, Streptopelia decaocto (I)
- Inca dove, Columbina inca
- Common ground dove, Columbina passerina
- Plain-breasted ground dove, Columbina minuta
- Ruddy ground dove, Columbina talpacoti
- Blue ground dove, Claravis pretiosa
- Maroon-chested ground dove, Paraclaravis mondetoura
- Ruddy quail-dove, Geotrygon montana
- White-tipped dove, Leptotila verreauxi
- Caribbean dove, Leptotila jamaicensis
- Gray-chested dove, Leptotila cassinii
- Gray-headed dove, Leptotila plumbeiceps
- White-faced quail-dove, Zentrygon albifacies
- White-winged dove, Zenaida asiatica
- Mourning dove, Zenaida macroura

== Cuckoos ==
Order: Cuculiformes Family: Cuculidae

The family Cuculidae includes cuckoos, roadrunners, and anis. These birds are of variable size with slender bodies, long tails, and strong legs.

- Smooth-billed ani, Crotophaga ani
- Groove-billed ani, Crotophaga sulcirostris
- Striped cuckoo, Tapera naevia
- Pheasant cuckoo, Dromococcyx phasianellus
- Lesser ground-cuckoo, Morococcyx erythropygus
- Lesser roadrunner, Geococcyx velox
- Rufous-vented ground-cuckoo, Neomorphus geoffroyi
- Squirrel cuckoo, Piaya cayana
- Yellow-billed cuckoo, Coccyzus americanus
- Mangrove cuckoo, Coccyzus minor
- Black-billed cuckoo, Coccyzus erythropthalmus

== Nightjars and allies ==
Order: Caprimulgiformes Family: Caprimulgidae

Nightjars are medium-sized nocturnal birds that usually nest on the ground. They have long wings, short legs, and very short bills. Most have small feet, of little use for walking, and long pointed wings. Their soft plumage is camouflaged to resemble bark or leaves.

- Short-tailed nighthawk, Lurocalis semitorquatus
- Lesser nighthawk, Chordeiles acutipennis
- Common nighthawk, Chordeiles minor
- Antillean nighthawk, Chordeiles gundlachii (A)
- Common pauraque, Nyctidromus albicollis
- Ocellated poorwill, Nyctiphrynus ocellatus
- Chuck-will's-widow, Antrostomus carolinensis (near-threatened)
- Yucatan nightjar, Antrostmus badius
- Buff-collared nightjar, Antrostomus ridgwayi
- Eastern whip-poor-will, Antrostomus vociferus (near-threatened)
- Mexican whip-poor-will, Antrostomus arizonae
- Spot-tailed nightjar, Hydropsalis maculicaudus

== Potoos ==
Order: Nyctibiiformes Family: Nyctibiidae

The potoos (sometimes called poor-me-ones) are large near passerine birds related to the nightjars and frogmouths. They are nocturnal insectivores which lack the bristles around the mouth found in the true nightjars.

- Great potoo, Nyctibius grandis
- Northern potoo, Nyctibius jamaicensis

== Swifts ==
Order: Apodiformes Family: Apodidae

Swifts are small birds which spend the majority of their lives flying. These birds have very short legs and never settle voluntarily on the ground, perching instead only on vertical surfaces. Many swifts have long swept-back wings which resemble a crescent or boomerang.

- Black swift, Cypseloides niger (vulnerable)
- White-chinned swift, Cypseloides cryptus
- Chestnut-collared swift, Streptoprocne rutila
- White-collared swift, Streptoprocne zonaris
- Gray-rumped swift, Chaetura cinereiventris
- Chimney swift, Chaetura pelagica (vulnerable)
- Vaux's swift, Chaetura vauxi
- White-throated swift, Aeronautes saxatalis
- Lesser swallow-tailed swift, Panyptila cayennensis
- Great swallow-tailed swift, Panyptila sanctihieronymi

== Hummingbirds ==
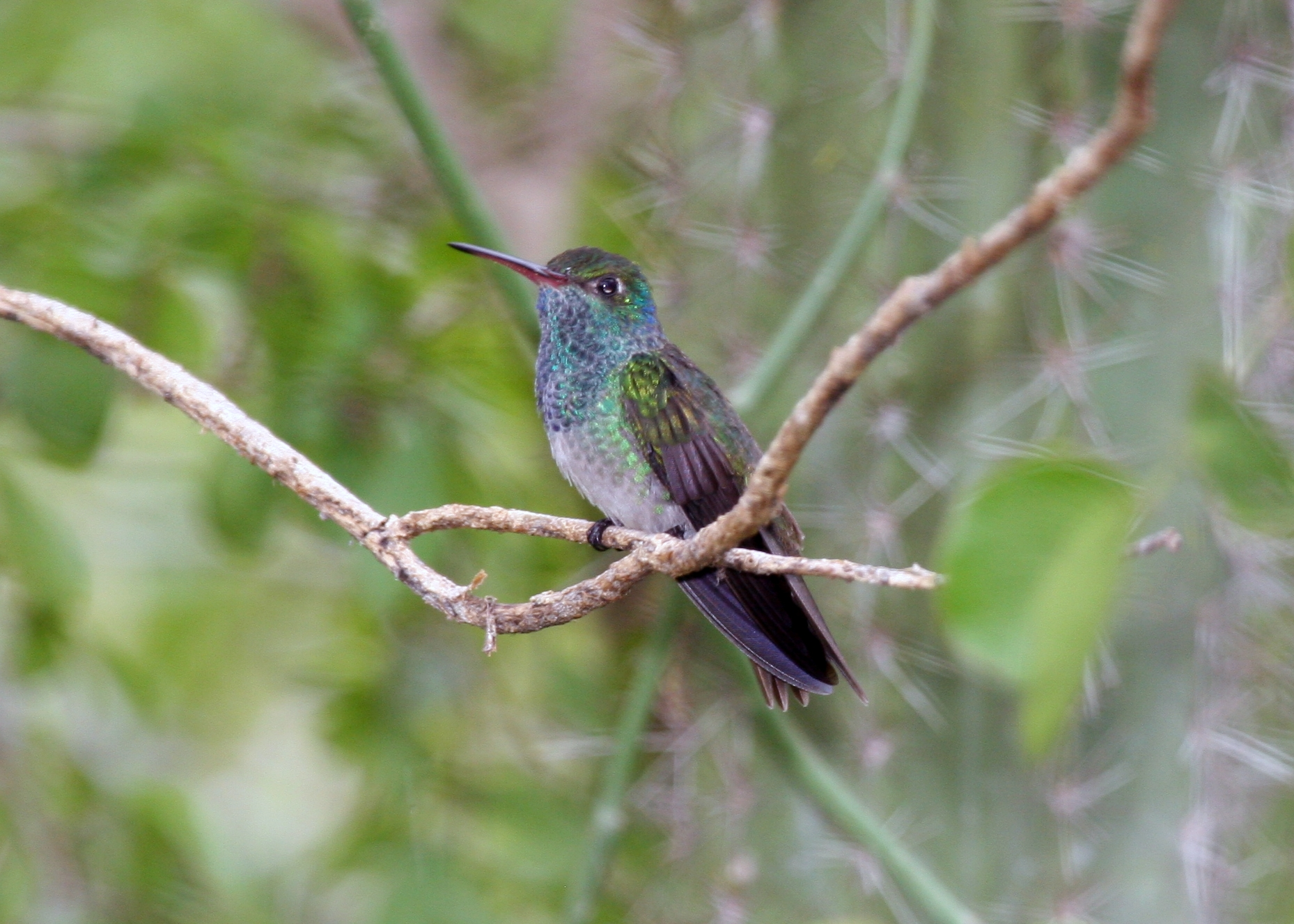
Honduran emerald, Honduras' only endemic bird species

Order: Apodiformes Family: Trochilidae

Hummingbirds are small birds capable of hovering in mid-air due to the rapid flapping of their wings. They are the only birds that can fly backwards.

- White-necked jacobin, Florisuga mellivora
- Bronzy hermit, Glaucis aenea
- Band-tailed barbthroat, Threnetes ruckeri
- Long-billed hermit, Phaethornis longirostris
- Stripe-throated hermit, Phaethornis striigularis
- Brown violetear, Colibri delphinae
- Mexican violetear, Colibri thalassinus (the ASHO retains the pre-split name of green violetear)
- Purple-crowned fairy, Heliothryx barroti
- Green-breasted mango, Anthracothorax prevostii
- Black-crested coquette, Lophornis helenae
- Rivoli's hummingbird, Eugenes fulgens
- Long-billed starthroat, Heliomaster longirostris
- Plain-capped starthroat, Heliomaster constantii
- Green-throated mountain-gem, Lampornis viridipallens
- Green-breasted mountain-gem, Lampornis sybillae
- Amethyst-throated mountain-gem, Lampornis amethystinus
- Garnet-throated hummingbird, Lamprolaima rhami
- Slender sheartail, Doricha enicura
- Sparkling-tailed hummingbird, Tilmatura dupontii
- Ruby-throated hummingbird, Archilochus colubris
- Wine-throated hummingbird, Selasphorus ellioti
- Canivet's emerald, Cynanthus canivetii
- White-eared hummingbird, Basilinna leucotis
- Wedge-tailed sabrewing, Pampa curvipennis
- Emerald-chinned hummingbird, Abeillia abeillei
- Violet-headed hummingbird, Klais guimeti
- Violet sabrewing, Campylopterus hemileucurus
- Bronze-tailed plumeleteer, Chalybura urochrysia
- Crowned woodnymph, Thalurania colombica
- Snowcap, Microchera albocoronata
- Stripe-tailed hummingbird, Eupherusa eximia
- Scaly-breasted hummingbird, Phaeochroa cuvierii
- Green-fronted hummingbird, Leucolia viridifrons (A)
- Azure-crowned hummingbird, Saucerottia cyanocephala
- Blue-vented hummingbird, Saucerottia hoffmanni
- Berylline hummingbird, Saucerottia beryllina
- Blue-tailed hummingbird, Saucerottia cyanura
- Cinnamon hummingbird, Amazilia rutila
- Buff-bellied hummingbird, Amazilia yucatanensis (A)
- Rufous-tailed hummingbird, Amazilia tzacatl
- Honduran emerald, Polyerata luciae or Amazilia luciae (E) (endangered)
- Blue-chested hummingbird, Polyerata amabilis
- White-bellied emerald, Chlorestes candida
- Blue-throated goldentail, Chlorestes eliciae

== Rails, gallinules, and coots ==
Order: Gruiformes Family: Rallidae

Rallidae is a large family of small to medium-sized birds which includes the rails, crakes, coots, and gallinules. Typically they inhabit dense vegetation in damp environments near lakes, swamps, or rivers. In general they are shy and secretive birds, making them difficult to observe. Most species have strong legs and long toes which are well adapted to soft uneven surfaces. They tend to have short, rounded wings and to be weak fliers.

- Spotted rail, Pardirallus maculatus
- Uniform crake, Amaurolimnas concolor
- Rufous-necked wood-rail, Aramides axillaris
- Russet-naped wood-rail, Aramides albiventris
- Mangrove rail, Rallus longirostris
- Sora, Porzana carolina
- Common gallinule, Gallinula galeata
- American coot, Fulica americana
- Purple gallinule, Porphyrio martinicus
- Yellow-breasted crake, Haplocrex flaviventer
- Ruddy crake, Laterallus ruber
- White-throated crake, Laterallus albigularis
- Gray-breasted crake, Laterallus exilis
- Black rail, Laterallus jamaicensis

== Finfoots ==
Order: Gruiformes Family: Heliornithidae

Heliornithidae is a small family of tropical birds with webbed lobes on their feet similar to those of grebes and coots.

- Sungrebe, Heliornis fulica

== Limpkin ==
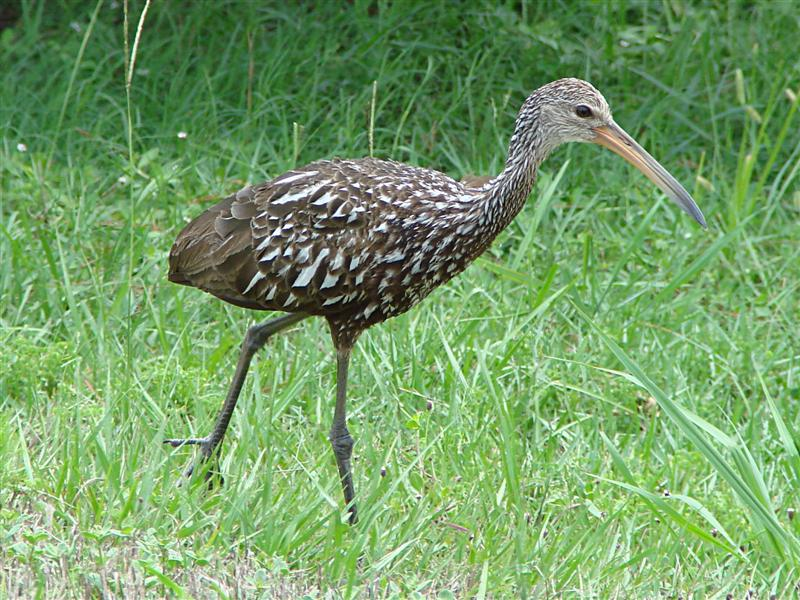
Limpkin

Order: Gruiformes Family: Aramidae

The limpkin resembles a large rail. It has drab-brown plumage and a grayer head and neck.

- Limpkin, Aramus guarauna

== Thick-knees ==
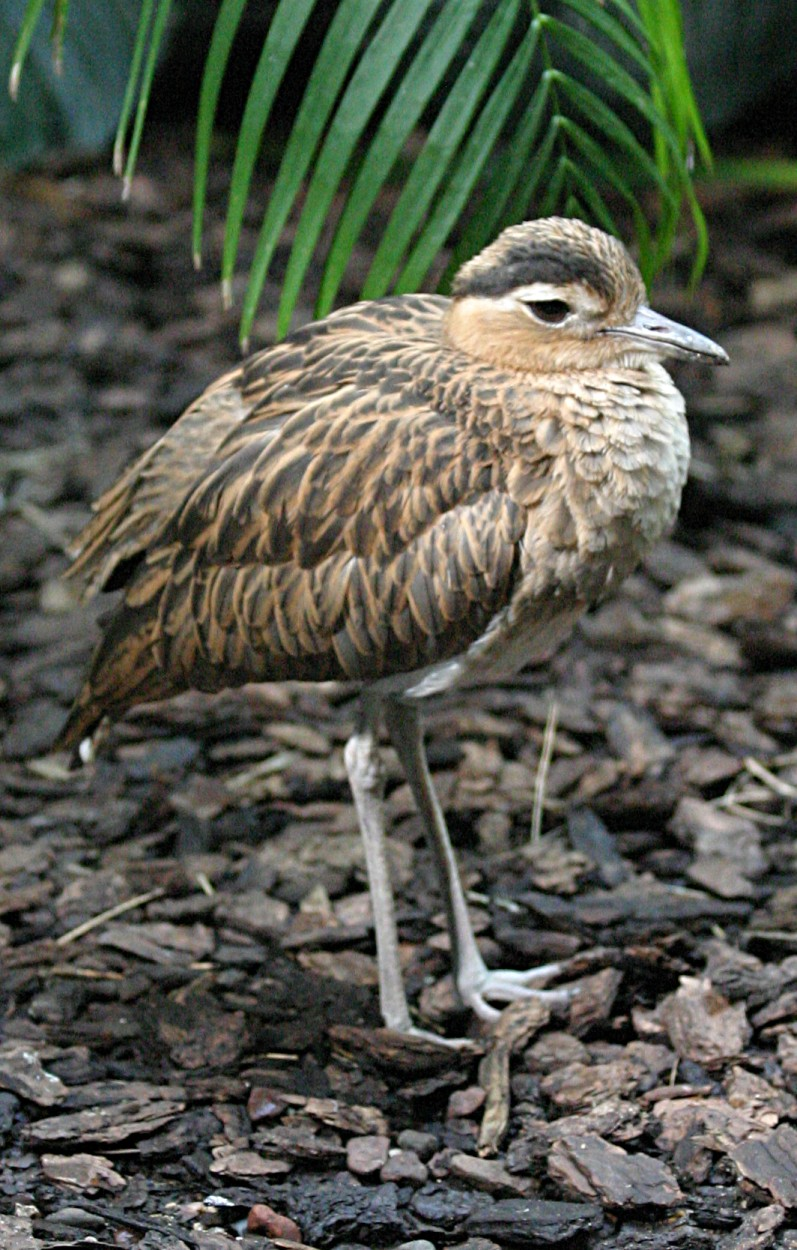
Double-striped thick-knee

Order: Charadriiformes Family: Burhinidae

The thick-knees are a group of waders in the family Burhinidae. They are found worldwide within the tropical zone, with some species also breeding in temperate Europe and Australia. They are medium to large waders with strong black or yellow-black bills, large yellow eyes, and cryptic plumage. Despite being classed as waders, most species have a preference for arid or semi-arid habitats.

- Double-striped thick-knee, Burhinus bistriatus

== Stilts and avocets ==
Order: Charadriiformes Family: Recurvirostridae

Recurvirostridae is a family of large wading birds which includes the avocets and stilts. The avocets have long legs and long up-curved bills. The stilts have extremely long legs and long, thin, straight bills.

- Black-necked stilt, Himantopus mexicanus
- American avocet, Recurvirostra americana

== Oystercatchers ==
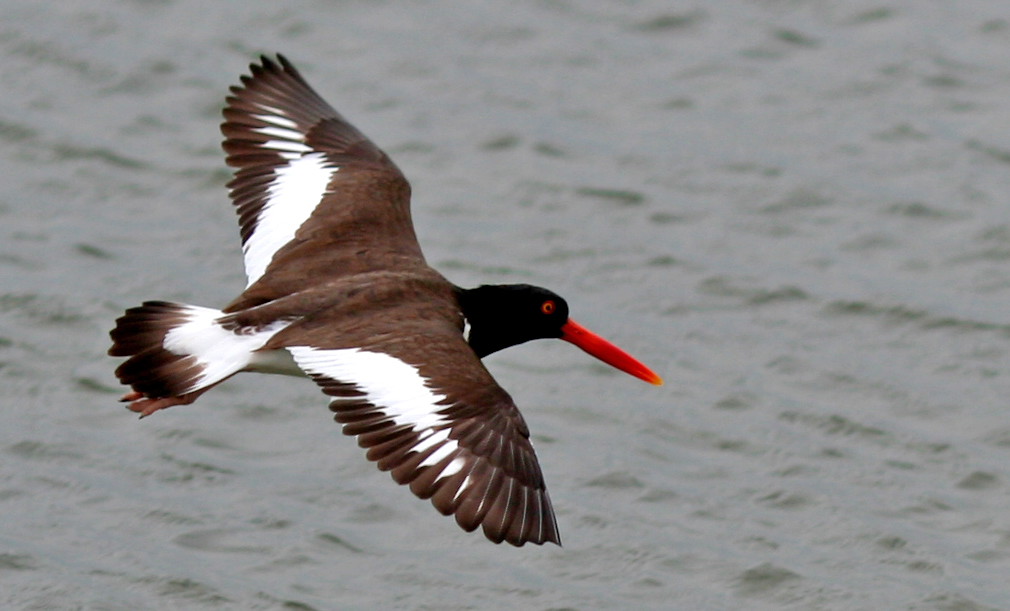
American oystercatcher

Order: Charadriiformes Family: Haematopodidae

The oystercatchers are large and noisy plover-like birds with strong bills used for smashing or prising open molluscs.

- American oystercatcher, Haematopus palliatus

== Plovers and lapwings ==
Order: Charadriiformes Family: Charadriidae

The family Charadriidae includes the plovers, dotterels, and lapwings. They are small to medium-sized birds with compact bodies, short thick necks, and long, usually pointed, wings. They are found in open country worldwide, mostly in habitats near water.

- Southern lapwing, Vanellus chilensis (A)
- Black-bellied plover, Pluvialis squatarola
- American golden-plover, Pluvialis dominica
- Killdeer, Charadrius vociferus
- Semipalmated plover, Charadrius semipalmatus
- Piping plover, Charadrius melodus (A) (near-threatened)
- Wilson's plover, Charadrius wilsonia
- Collared plover, Charadrius collaris
- Snowy plover, Charadrius nivosus (near-threatened)

== Jacanas ==
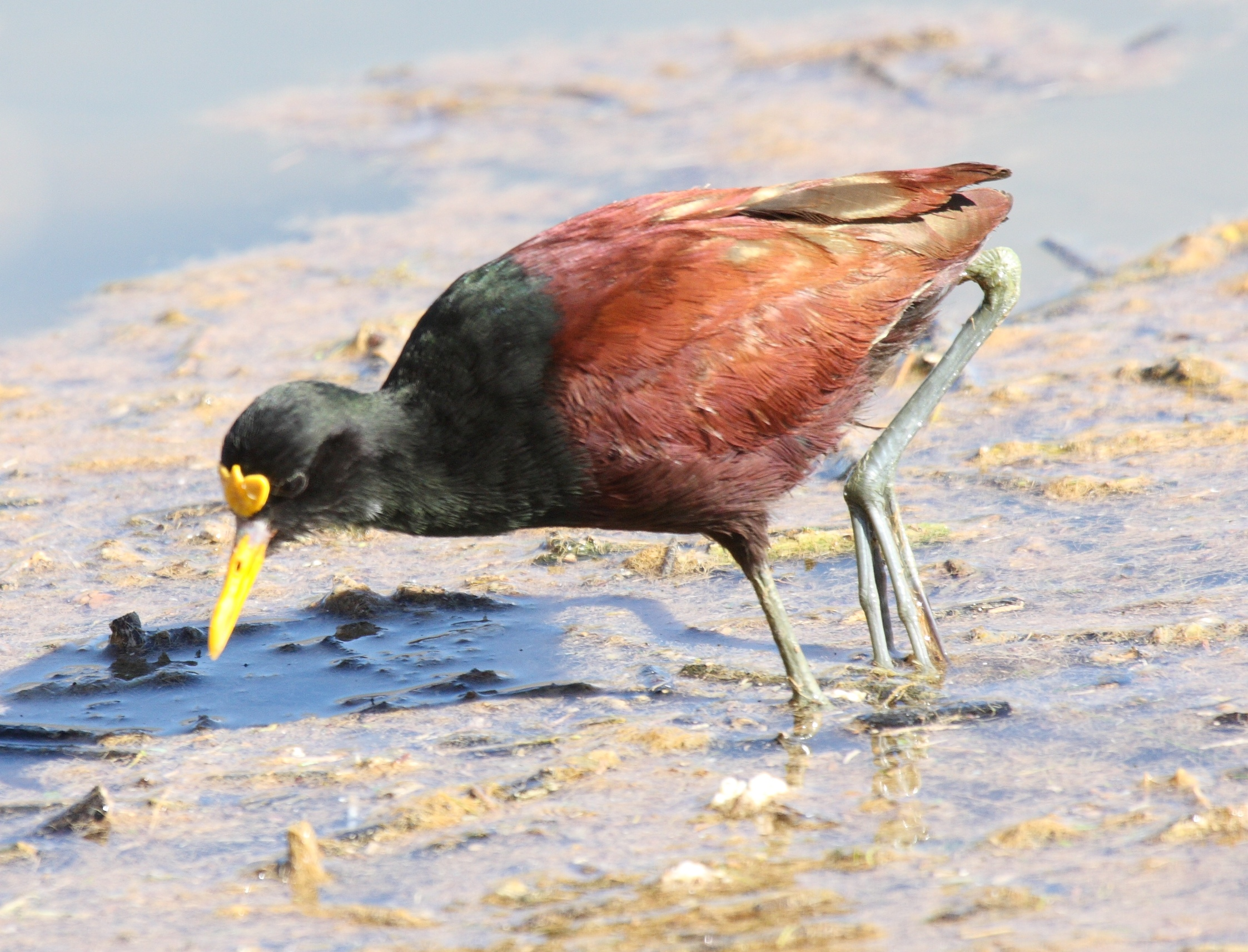
Northern jacana

Order: Charadriiformes Family: Jacanidae

The jacanas are a group of waders in the family Jacanidae which are found throughout the tropics. They are identifiable by their huge feet and claws which enable them to walk on floating vegetation in the shallow lakes which are their preferred habitat.

- Northern jacana, Jacana spinosa

== Sandpipers and allies ==
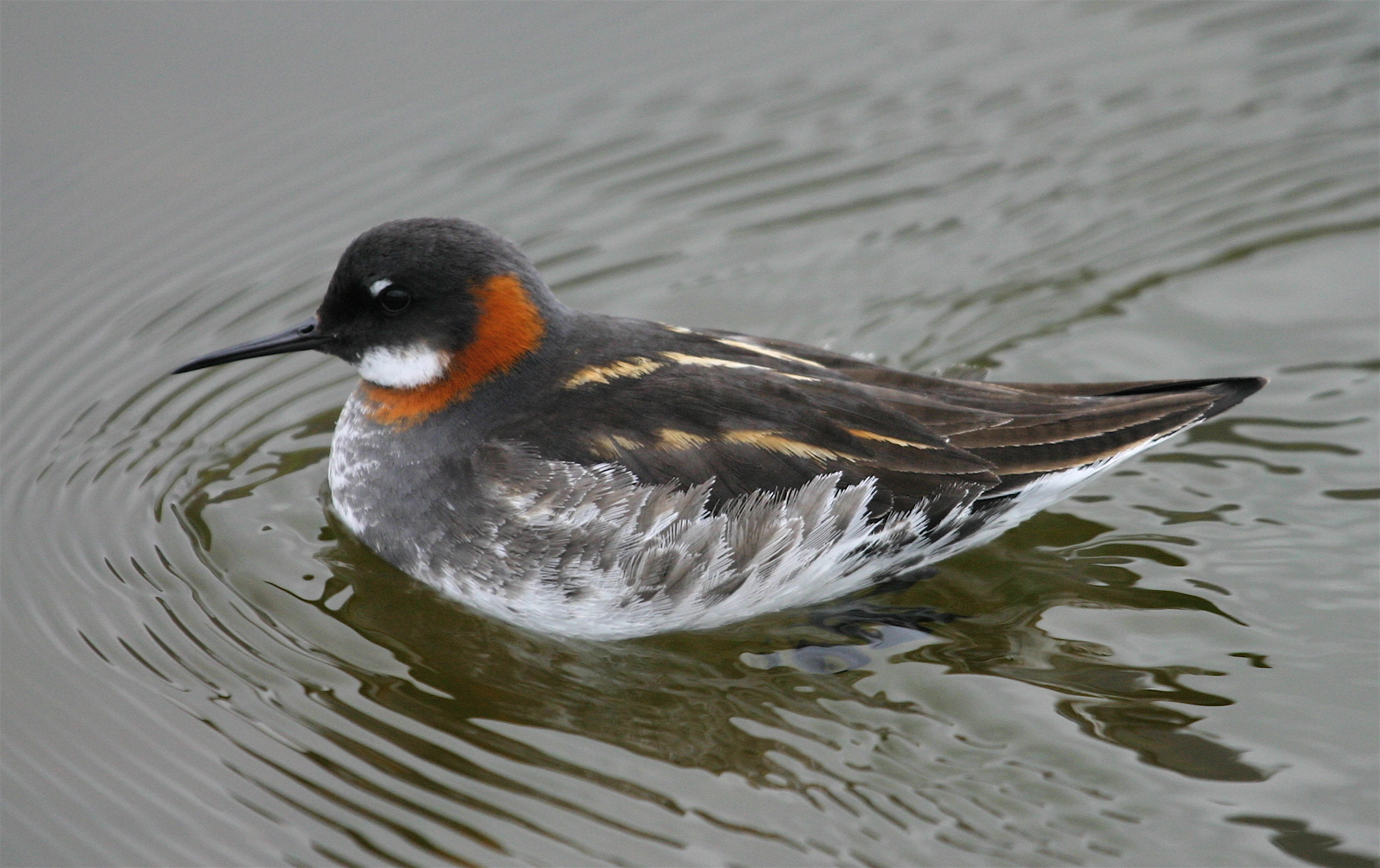
Red-necked phalarope

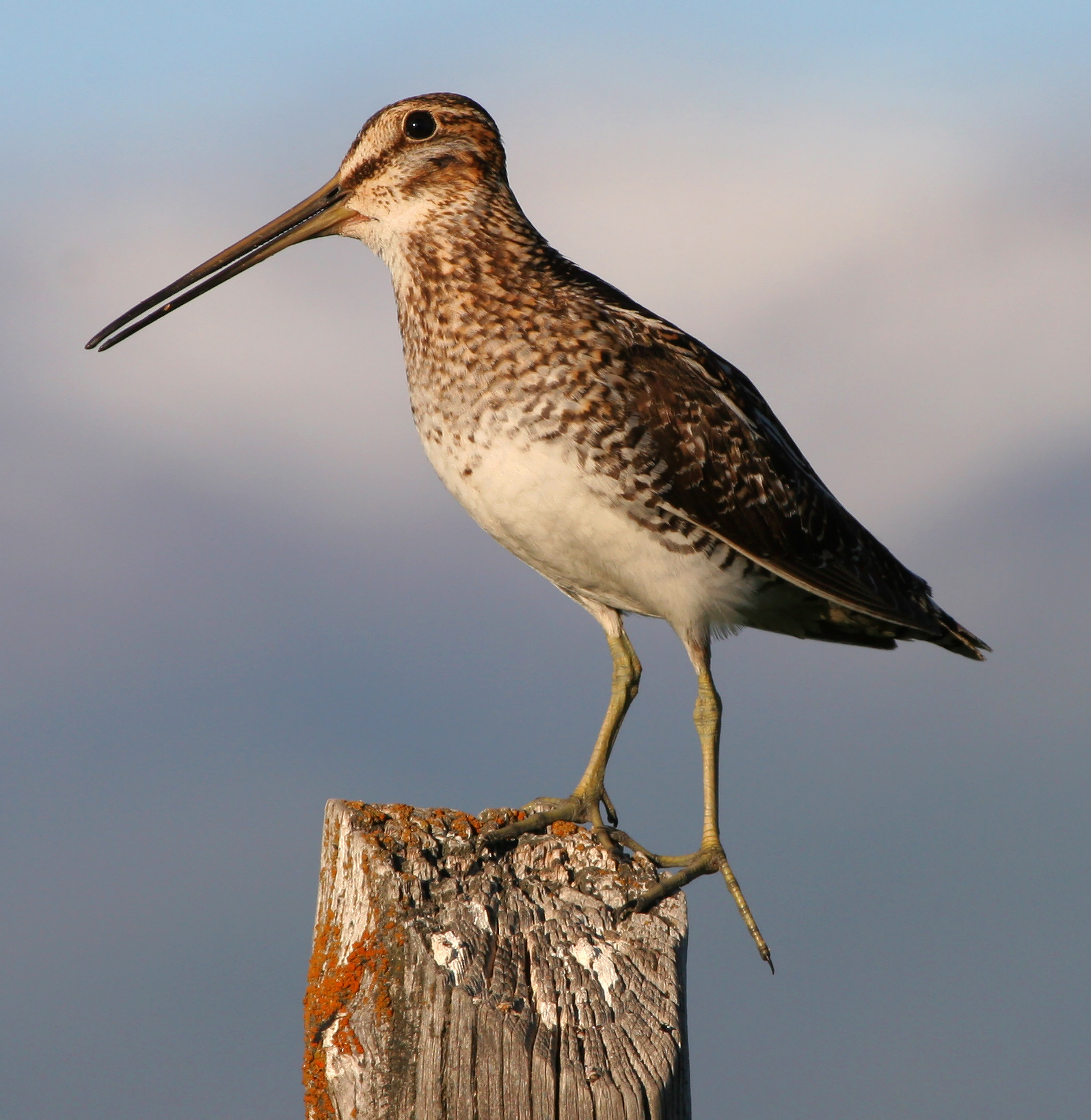
Wilson's snipe

Order: Charadriiformes Family: Scolopacidae

Scolopacidae is a large diverse family of small to medium-sized shorebirds including the sandpipers, curlews, godwits, shanks, tattlers, woodcocks, snipes, dowitchers, and phalaropes. The majority of these species eat small invertebrates picked out of the mud or soil. Variation in length of legs and bills enables multiple species to feed in the same habitat, particularly on the coast, without direct competition for food.

- Upland sandpiper, Bartramia longicauda
- Whimbrel, Numenius phaeopus
- Long-billed curlew, Numenius americanus
- Hudsonian godwit, Limosa haemastica (A)
- Marbled godwit, Limosa fedoa
- Ruddy turnstone, Arenaria interpres
- Red knot, Calidris canutus (near-threatened)
- Surfbird, Calidris virgata (A)
- Stilt sandpiper, Calidris himantopus
- Sanderling, Calidris alba
- Baird's sandpiper, Calidris bairdii
- Least sandpiper, Calidris minutilla
- White-rumped sandpiper, Calidris fuscicollis
- Buff-breasted sandpiper, Calidris subruficollis (near-threatened)
- Pectoral sandpiper, Calidris melanotos
- Semipalmated sandpiper, Calidris pusilla (near-threatened)
- Western sandpiper, Calidris mauri
- Short-billed dowitcher, Limnodromus griseus
- Long-billed dowitcher, Limnodromus scolopaceus
- Wilson's snipe, Gallinago delicata
- Spotted sandpiper, Actitis macularia
- Solitary sandpiper, Tringa solitaria
- Wandering tattler, Tringa incana
- Lesser yellowlegs, Tringa flavipes
- Willet, Tringa semipalmata
- Greater yellowlegs, Tringa melanoleuca
- Wilson's phalarope, Phalaropus tricolor
- Red-necked phalarope, Phalaropus lobatus (A)

== Skuas and jaegers ==
Order: Charadriiformes Family: Stercorariidae

The family Stercorariidae are, in general, medium to large birds, typically with gray or brown plumage, often with white markings on the wings. They nest on the ground in temperate and arctic regions and are long-distance migrants.

- Pomarine jaeger, Stercorarius pomarinus
- Parasitic jaeger, Stercorarius parasiticus
- Long-tailed jaeger, Stercorarius longicaudus

== Gulls, terns, and skimmers ==
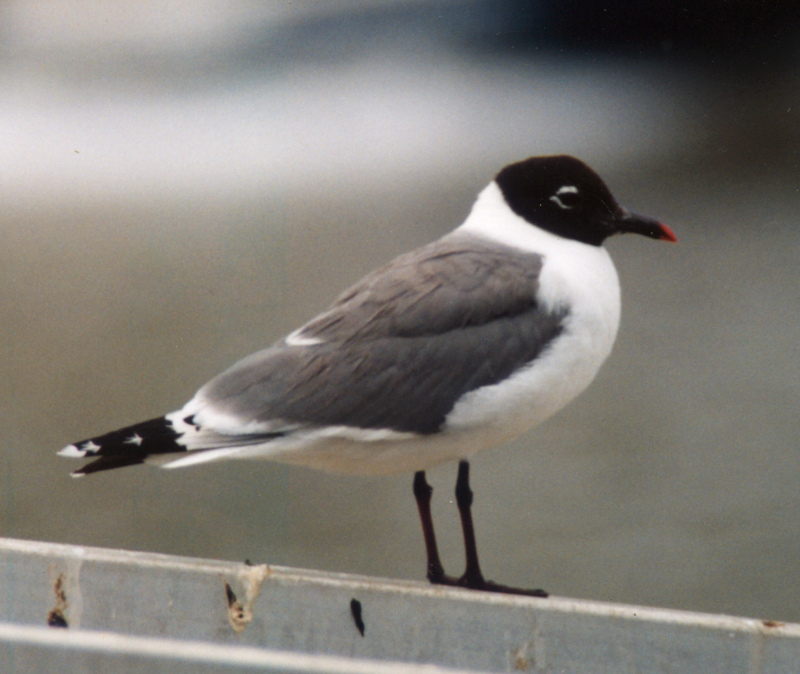
Franklin's gull

Order: Charadriiformes Family: Laridae

Laridae is a family of medium to large seabirds and includes gulls, kittiwakes, terns, and skimmers. They are typically gray or white, often with black markings on the head or wings. They have longish bills and webbed feet. Terns are a group of generally medium to large seabirds typically with gray or white plumage, often with black markings on the head. Most terns hunt fish by diving but some pick insects off the surface of fresh water. Terns are generally long-lived birds, with several species known to live in excess of 30 years. Skimmers are a small family of tropical tern-like birds. They have an elongated lower mandible which they use to feed by flying low over the water surface and skimming the water for small fish.

- Sabine's gull, Xema sabini (A)
- Bonaparte's gull, Chroicocephalus philadelphia (A)
- Laughing gull, Leucophaeus atricilla (A)
- Franklin's gull, Leucophaeus pipixcan
- Heermann's gull, Larus heermanni (A)
- Ring-billed gull, Larus delawarensis
- Western gull, Larus occidentalis (A)
- California gull, Larus californicus (A)
- Herring gull, Larus argentatus
- Lesser black-backed gull, Larus fuscus (A)
- Kelp gull, Larus dominicanus (A)
- Brown noddy, Anous stolidus
- Black noddy, Anous minutus
- Sooty tern, Onychoprion fuscata (A)
- Bridled tern, Onychoprion anaethetus
- Least tern, Sternula antillarum
- Large-billed tern, Phaetusa simplex (A)
- Gull-billed tern, Gelochelidon nilotica
- Caspian tern, Hydroprogne caspia
- Black tern, Chlidonias niger
- Roseate tern, Sterna dougallii
- Common tern, Sterna hirundo
- Arctic tern, Sterna paradisaea (A)
- Forster's tern, Sterna forsteri
- Royal tern, Thalasseus maxima
- Sandwich tern, Thalasseus sandvicensis
- Elegant tern, Thalasseus elegans (near-threatened)
- Black skimmer, Rynchops niger

== Tropicbirds ==
Order: Phaethontiformes Family: Phaethontidae

Tropicbirds are slender white birds of tropical oceans, with exceptionally long central tail feathers. Their long wings have black markings, as does the head.

- White-tailed tropicbird, Phaethon lepturus (A)

== Sunbittern ==
Order: Eurypygiformes Family: Eurypygidae

The sunbittern is a bittern-like bird of tropical regions of the Americas and the sole member of the family Eurypygidae (sometimes spelled Eurypigidae) and genus Eurypyga.

- Sunbittern, Eurypyga helias

== Northern storm-petrels ==
Order: Procellariiformes Family: Hydrobatidae

The storm-petrels are relatives of the petrels and are the smallest seabirds. They feed on planktonic crustaceans and small fish picked from the surface, typically while hovering. The flight is fluttering and sometimes bat-like.

- Wedge-rumped storm-petrel, Hydrobates tethys (A)
- Black storm-petrel, Hydrobates melania (A)
- Least storm-petrel, Hydrobates microsoma (A)

== Shearwaters and petrels ==
Order: Procellariiformes Family: Procellariidae

The procellariids are the main group of medium-sized "true petrels", characterized by united nostrils with medium septum and a long outer functional primary.

- Cory's shearwater, Calonectris diomedea (A)
- Great shearwater, Ardenna gravis (A)
- Sooty shearwater, Ardenna grisea (A)
- Sargasso shearwater, Puffinus lherminieri (A)

== Storks ==
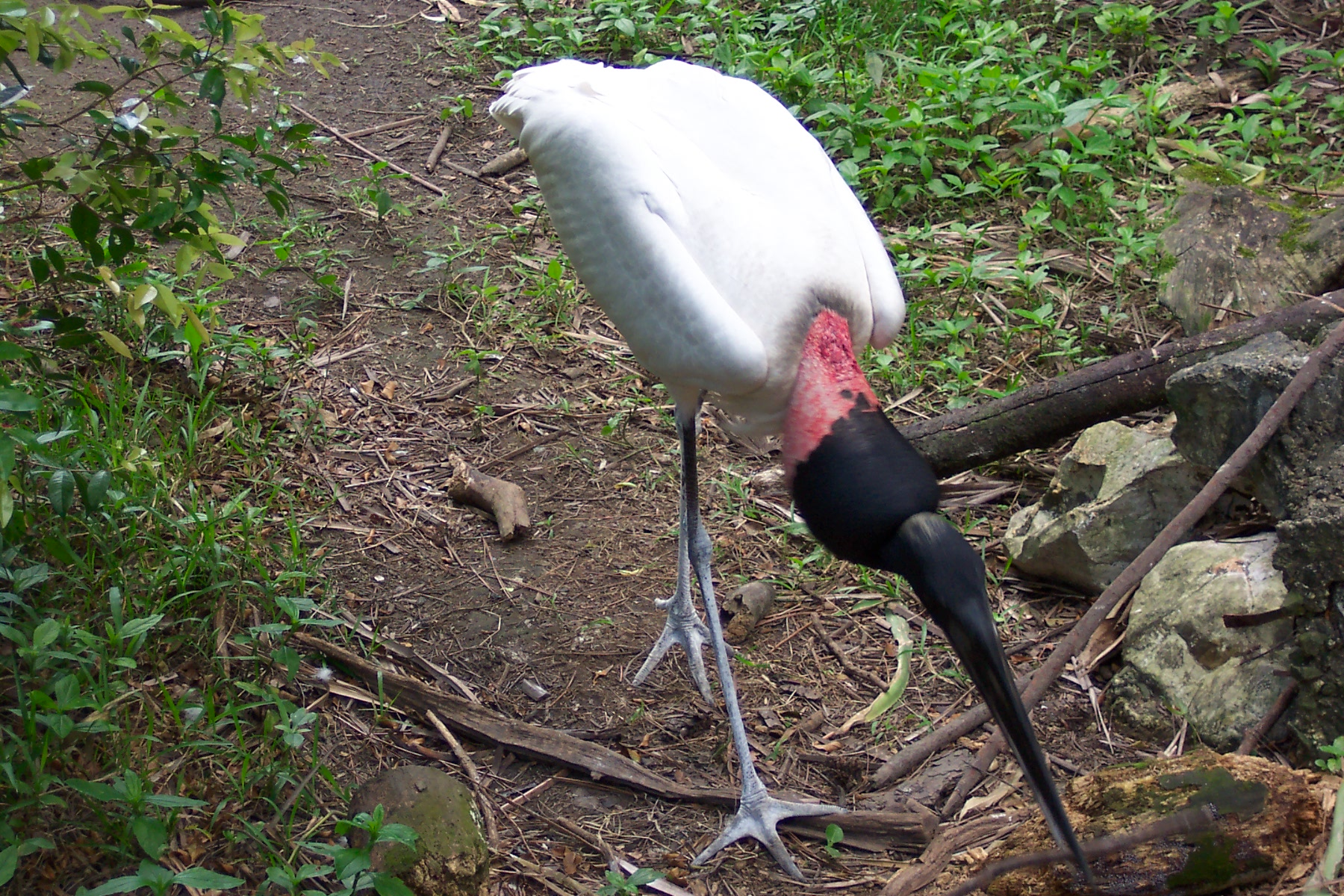
Jabiru

Order: Ciconiiformes Family: Ciconiidae

Storks are large, long-legged, long-necked wading birds with long, stout bills. Storks are mute, but bill-clattering is an important mode of communication at the nest. Their nests can be large and may be reused for many years. Many species are migratory.

- Jabiru, Jabiru mycteria
- Wood stork, Mycteria americana

== Frigatebirds ==
Order: Suliformes Family: Fregatidae

Frigatebirds are large seabirds usually found over tropical oceans. They are large, black-and-white, or completely black, with long wings and deeply forked tails. The males have colored inflatable throat pouches. They do not swim or walk and cannot take off from a flat surface. Having the largest wingspan-to-body-weight ratio of any bird, they are essentially aerial, able to stay aloft for more than a week.

- Magnificent frigatebird, Fregata magnificens

== Boobies and gannets ==
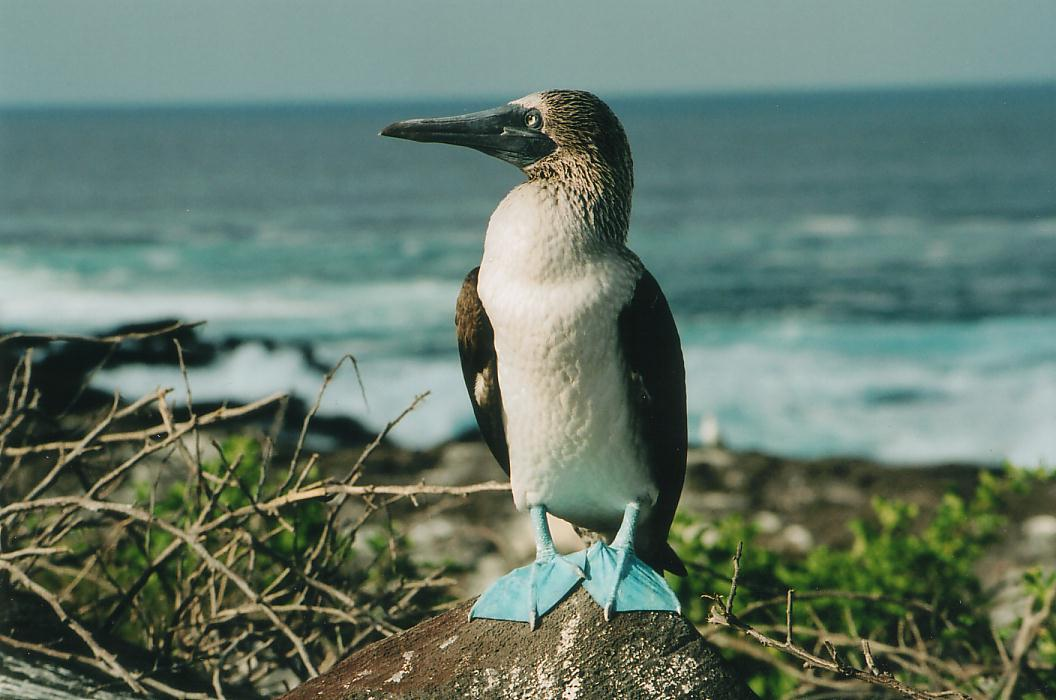
Blue-footed booby

Order: Suliformes Family: Sulidae

The sulids comprise the gannets and boobies. Both groups are medium to large coastal seabirds that plunge-dive for fish.

- Masked booby, Sula dactylatra
- Blue-footed booby, Sula nebouxii
- Brown booby, Sula leucogaster
- Red-footed booby, Sula sula (A)

== Anhingas ==
Order: Suliformes Family: Anhingidae

Anhingas are often called "snake-birds" because of their long thin neck, which gives a snake-like appearance when they swim with their bodies submerged. The males have black and dark-brown plumage, an erectile crest on the nape, and a larger bill than the female. The females have much paler plumage especially on the neck and underparts. The anhingas have completely webbed feet and their legs are short and set far back on the body. Their plumage is somewhat permeable, like that of cormorants, and they spread their wings to dry after diving.

- Anhinga, Anhinga anhinga

== Cormorants and shags ==
Order: Suliformes Family: Phalacrocoracidae

Phalacrocoracidae is a family of medium to large coastal, fish-eating seabirds that includes cormorants and shags. Coloration varies, with the majority having mainly dark plumage, some species being black-and-white, and a few being colorful.

- Double-crested cormorant, Nannopterum auritum (A)
- Neotropic cormorant, Nannopterum brasilianum

== Pelicans ==
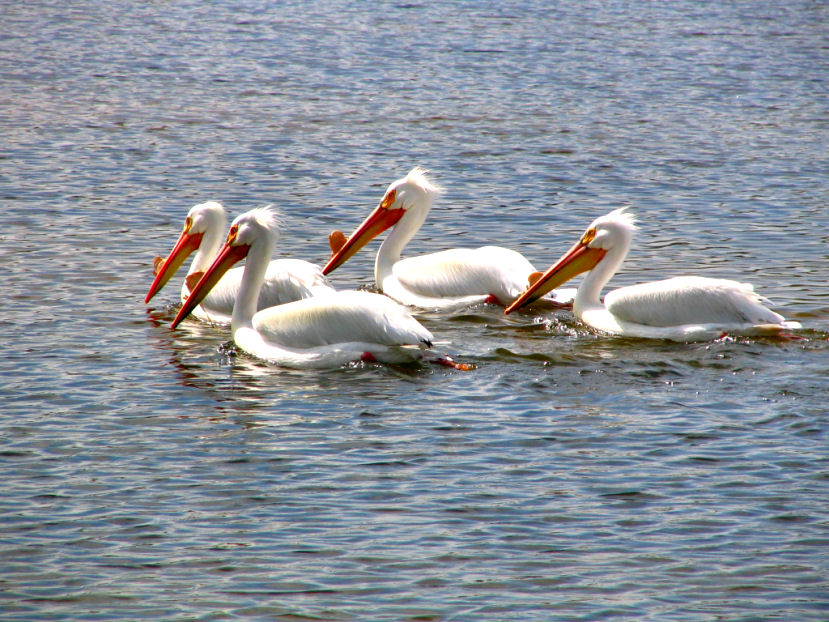
American white pelicans

Order: Pelecaniformes Family: Pelecanidae

Pelicans are large water birds with a distinctive pouch under their beak. As with other members of the order Pelecaniformes, they have webbed feet with four toes.

- American white pelican, Pelecanus erythrorhynchos
- Brown pelican, Pelecanus occidentalis

== Herons, egrets, and bitterns ==
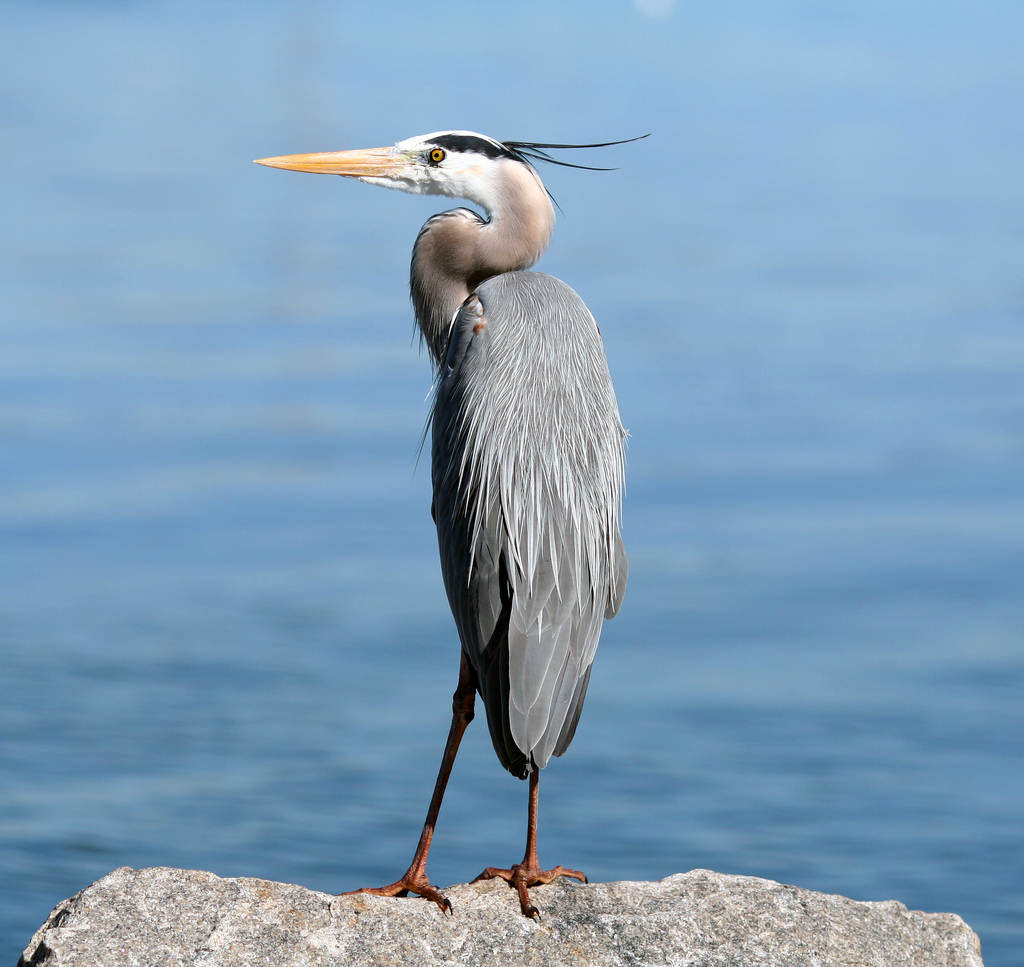
Great blue heron

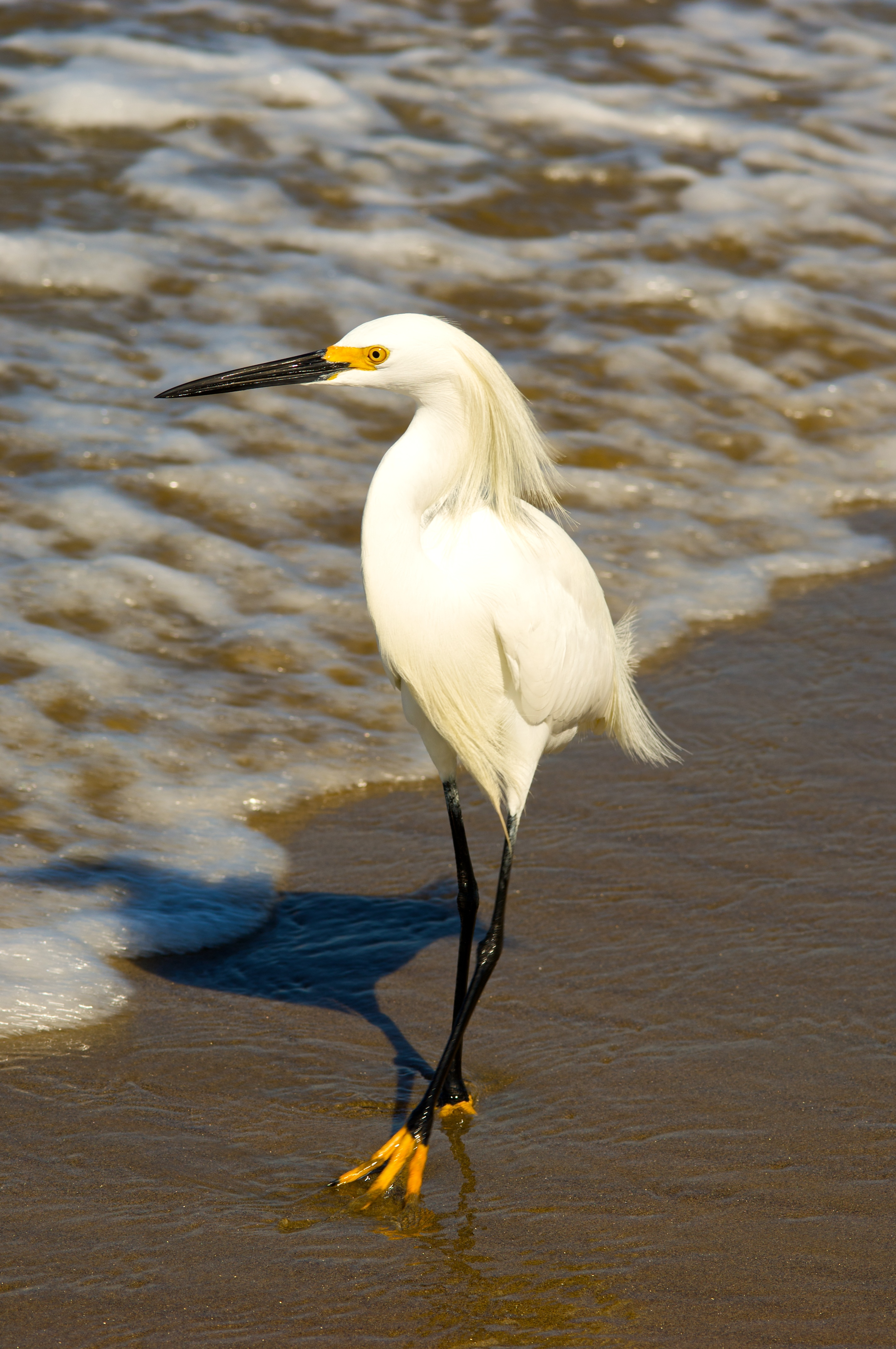
Snowy egret

Order: Pelecaniformes Family: Ardeidae

The family Ardeidae contains the bitterns, herons, and egrets. Herons and egrets are medium to large wading birds with long necks and legs. Bitterns tend to be shorter necked and more wary. Members of Ardeidae fly with their necks retracted, unlike other long-necked birds such as storks, ibises and spoonbills.

- Pinnated bittern, Botaurus pinnatus
- American bittern, Botaurus lentiginosus
- Least bittern, Ixobrychus exilis
- Rufescent tiger-heron, Tigrisoma lineatum
- Fasciated tiger-heron, Tigrisoma fasciatum
- Bare-throated tiger-heron, Tigrisoma mexicanum
- Great blue heron, Ardea herodias
- Great egret, Ardea alba
- Snowy egret, Egretta thula
- Little blue heron, Egretta caerulea
- Tricolored heron, Egretta tricolor
- Reddish egret, Egretta rufescens (near-threatened)
- Cattle egret, Bubulcus ibis
- Green heron, Butorides virescens
- Agami heron, Agamia agami (vulnerable)
- Black-crowned night-heron, Nycticorax nycticorax
- Yellow-crowned night-heron, Nyctanassa violacea
- Boat-billed heron, Cochlearius cochlearius

== Ibises and spoonbills ==
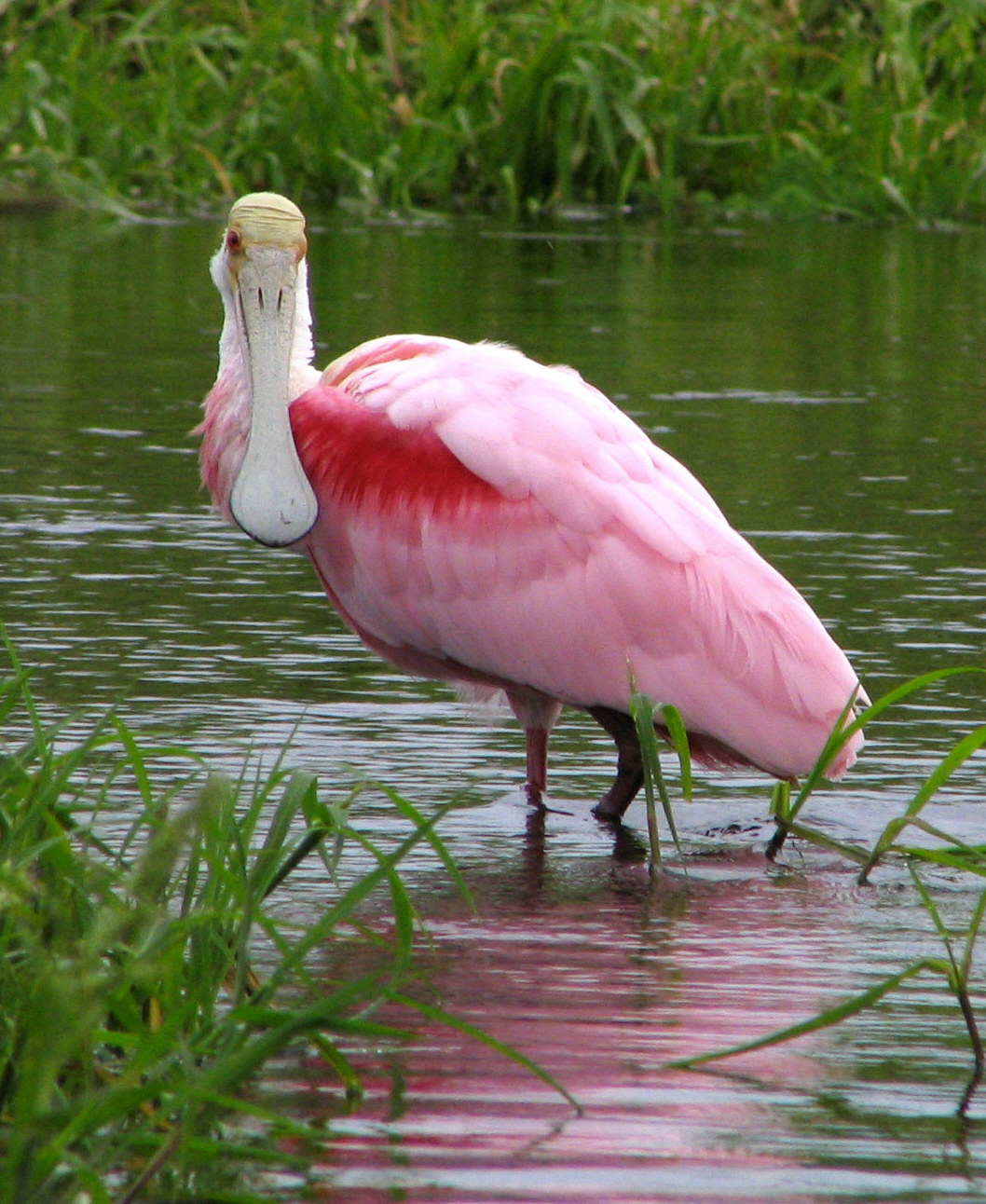
Roseate spoonbill

Order: Pelecaniformes Family: Threskiornithidae

Threskiornithidae is a family of large terrestrial and wading birds which includes the ibises and spoonbills. They have long, broad wings with 11 primary and about 20 secondary feathers. They are strong fliers and despite their size and weight, very capable soarers.

- White ibis, Eudocimus albus
- Glossy ibis, Plegadis falcinellus
- White-faced ibis, Plegadis chihi (A)
- Green ibis, Mesembrinibis cayennensis
- Roseate spoonbill, Platalea ajaja

== New World vultures ==
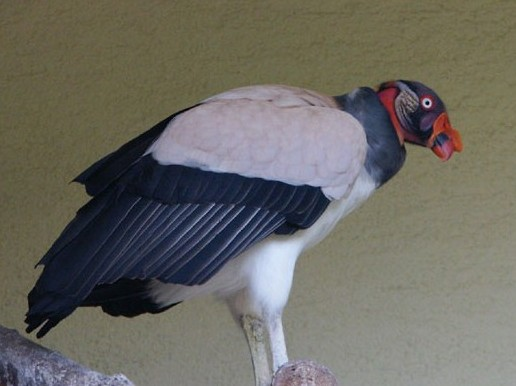
King vulture

Order: Cathartiformes Family: Cathartidae

The New World vultures are not closely related to Old World vultures, but superficially resemble them because of convergent evolution. Like the Old World vultures, they are scavengers. However, unlike Old World vultures, which find carcasses by sight, New World vultures have a good sense of smell with which they locate carrion.

- King vulture, Sarcoramphus papa
- Black vulture, Coragyps atratus
- Turkey vulture, Cathartes aura
- Lesser yellow-headed vulture, Cathartes burrovianus

== Osprey ==
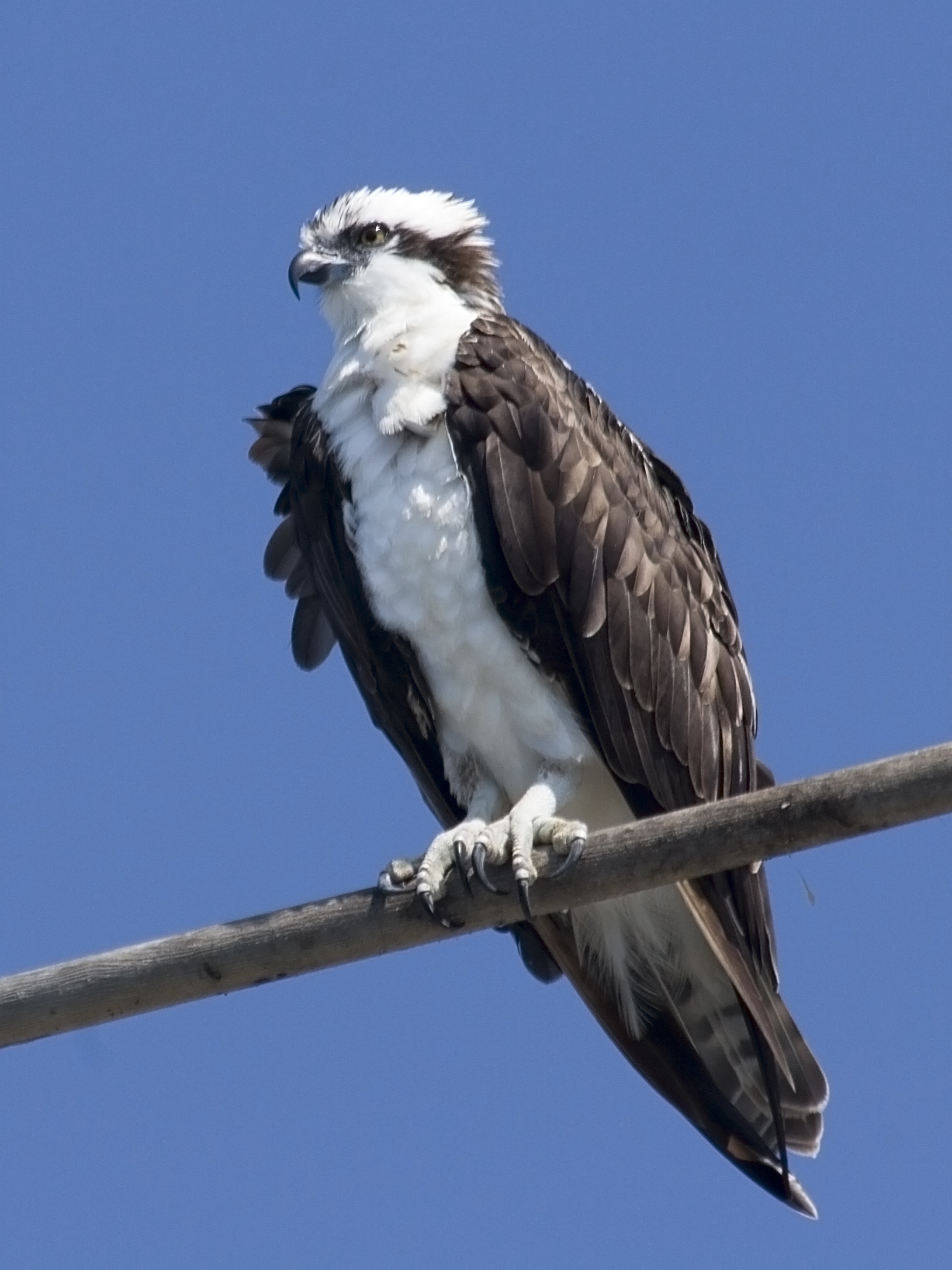
Osprey

Order: Accipitriformes Family: Pandionidae

The family Pandionidae contains only one species, the osprey. The osprey is a medium-large raptor which is a specialist fish-eater with a worldwide distribution.

- Osprey, Pandion haliaetus

== Hawks, eagles, and kites ==
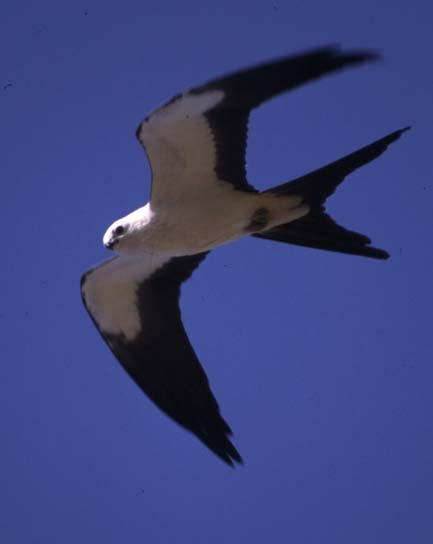
Swallow-tailed kite

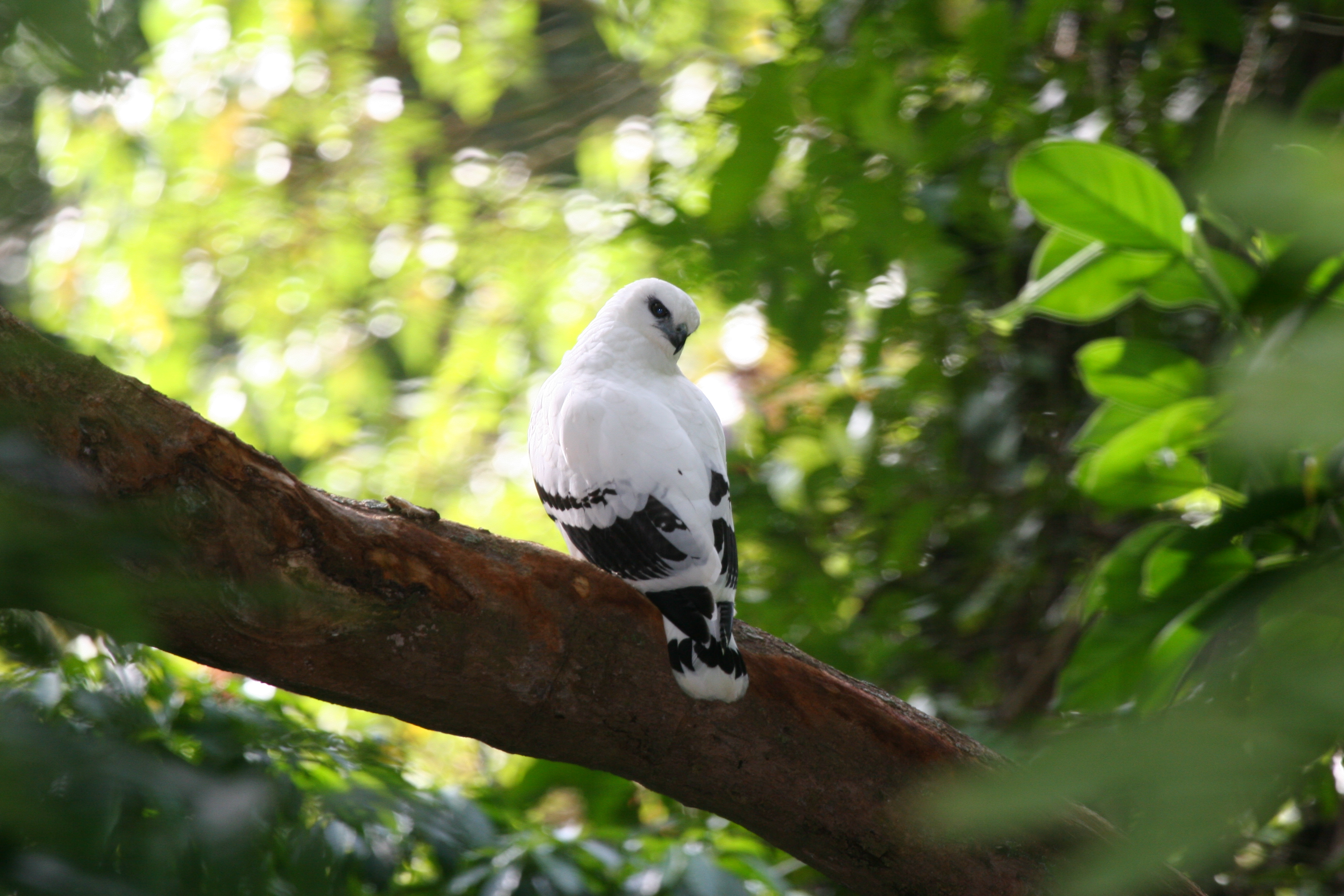
White hawk

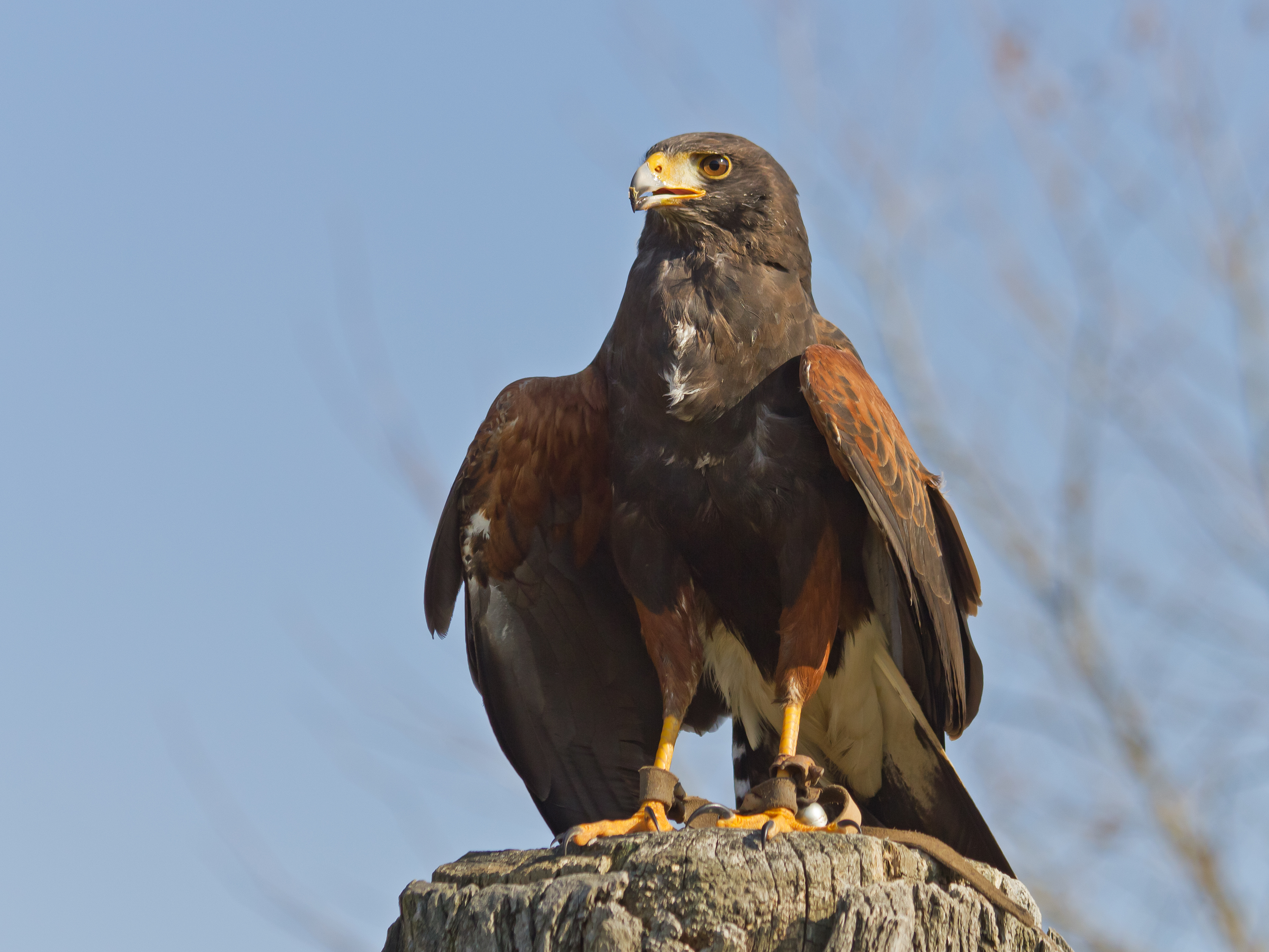
Harris's hawk

Order: Accipitriformes Family: Accipitridae

Accipitridae is a family of birds of prey, which includes hawks, eagles, kites, harriers, and Old World vultures. These birds have powerful hooked beaks for tearing flesh from their prey, strong legs, powerful talons, and keen eyesight.

- Pearl kite, Gampsonyx swainsonii
- White-tailed kite, Elanus leucurus
- Hook-billed kite, Chondrohierax uncinatus
- Gray-headed kite, Leptodon cayanensis
- Swallow-tailed kite, Elanoides forficatus
- Crested eagle, Morphnus guianensis (near-threatened)
- Harpy eagle, Harpia harpyja (near-threatened)
- Black hawk-eagle, Spizaetus tyrannus
- Black-and-white hawk-eagle, Spizaetus melanoleucus
- Ornate hawk-eagle, Spizaetus ornatus (near-threatened)
- Double-toothed kite, Harpagus bidentatus
- Northern harrier, Circus hudsonius
- Tiny hawk, Accipiter superciliosus (A)
- Sharp-shinned hawk, Accipiter striatus
- Cooper's hawk, Accipiter cooperii
- Bicolored hawk, Accipiter bicolor
- Mississippi kite, Ictinia mississippiensis
- Plumbeous kite, Ictinia plumbea
- Black-collared hawk, Busarellus nigricollis
- Crane hawk, Geranospiza caerulescens
- Snail kite, Rostrhamus sociabilis
- Common black hawk, Buteogallus anthracinus
- Great black hawk, Buteogallus urubitinga
- Solitary eagle, Buteogallus solitarius (near-threatened)
- Roadside hawk, Rupornis magnirostris
- Harris's hawk, Parabuteo unicinctus
- White-tailed hawk, Geranoaetus albicaudatus
- White hawk, Pseudastur albicollis
- Semiplumbeous hawk, Leucopternis semiplumbeus
- Gray hawk, Buteo plagiatus
- Broad-winged hawk, Buteo platypterus
- Short-tailed hawk, Buteo brachyurus
- Swainson's hawk, Buteo swainsoni
- Zone-tailed hawk, Buteo albonotatus
- Red-tailed hawk, Buteo jamaicensis

== Barn-owls ==
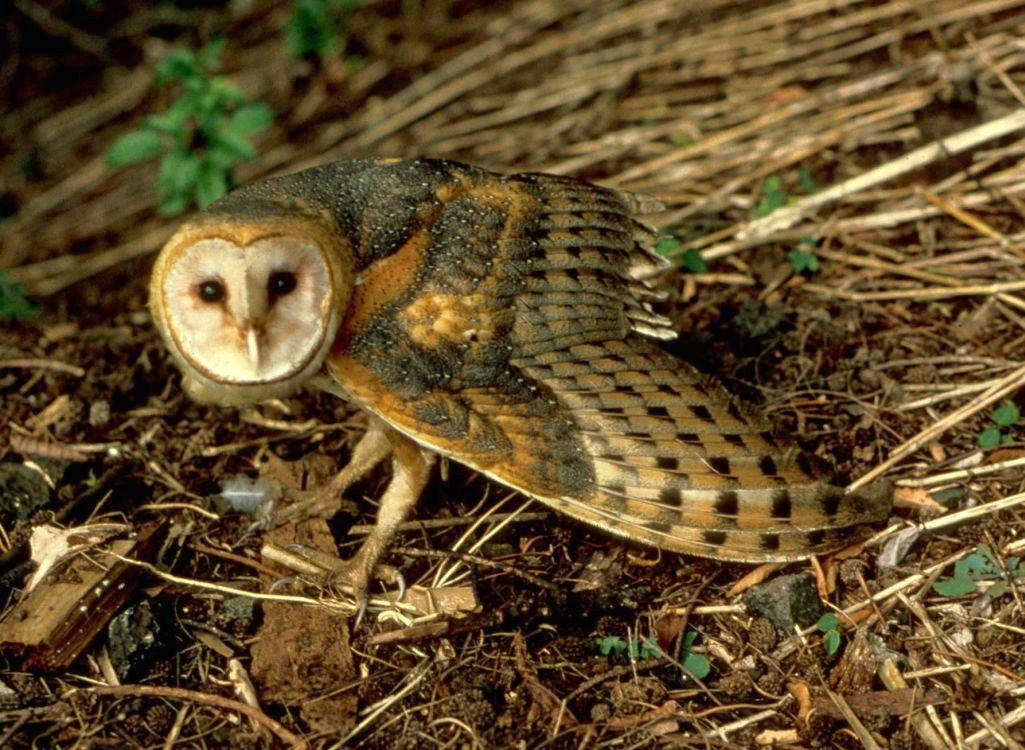
Barn owl

Order: Strigiformes Family: Tytonidae

Barn-owls are medium to large owls with large heads and characteristic heart-shaped faces. They have long strong legs with powerful talons.

- American barn owl, Tyto furcata

== Owls ==
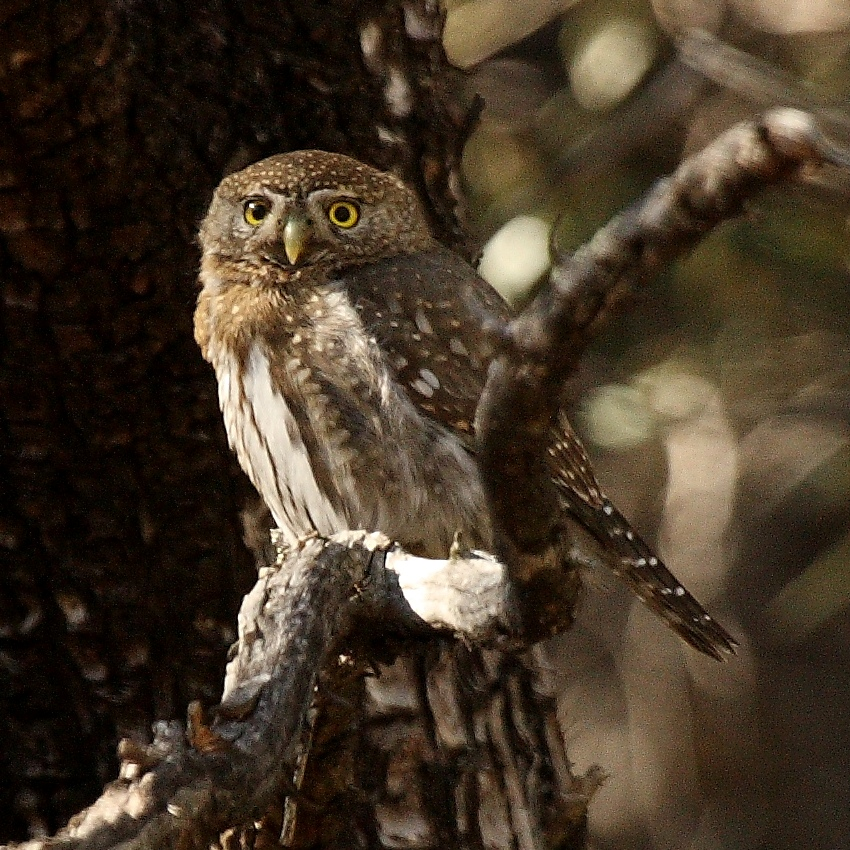
Northern pygmy-owl

Order: Strigiformes Family: Strigidae

The typical owls are small to large solitary nocturnal birds of prey. They have large forward-facing eyes and ears, a hawk-like beak, and a conspicuous circle of feathers around each eye called a facial disk.

- Whiskered screech-owl, Megascops trichopsis
- Pacific screech-owl, Megascops cooperi
- Middle-American screech-owl, Megascops guatemalae
- Crested owl, Lophostrix cristata
- Spectacled owl, Pulsatrix perspicillata
- Great horned owl, Bubo virginianus
- Northern pygmy-owl, Glaucidium gnoma
- Central American pygmy-owl, Glaucidium griseiceps
- Ferruginous pygmy-owl, Glaucidium brasilianum
- Burrowing owl, Athene cunicularia (A)
- Mottled owl, Strix virgata
- Black-and-white owl, Strix nigrolineata
- Fulvous owl, Strix fulvescens
- Stygian owl, Asio stygius
- Striped owl, Asio clamator
- Short-eared owl, Asio flammeus (A)
- Unspotted saw-whet owl, Aegolius ridgwayi (A)

== Trogons ==
Order: Trogoniformes Family: Trogonidae

The family Trogonidae includes trogons and quetzals. Found in tropical woodlands worldwide, they feed on insects and fruit, and their broad bills and weak legs reflect their diet and arboreal habits. Although their flight is fast, they are reluctant to fly any distance. Trogons have soft, often colorful, feathers with distinctive male and female plumage.

- Slaty-tailed trogon, Trogon massena
- Black-headed trogon, Trogon melanocephalus
- Gartered trogon, Trogon caligatus
- Northern black-throated trogon, Trogon tenellus
- Elegant trogon, Trogon elegans
- Mountain trogon, Trogon mexicanus
- Collared trogon, Trogon collaris
- Resplendent quetzal, Pharomachrus mocinno (near-threatened)

== Motmots ==
Order: Coraciiformes Family: Momotidae

The motmots have colorful plumage and long, graduated tails which they display by waggling back and forth. In most of the species, the barbs near the ends of the two longest (central) tail feathers are weak and fall off, leaving a length of bare shaft and creating a racket-shaped tail.

- Tody motmot, Hylomanes momotula
- Blue-throated motmot, Aspatha gularis
- Lesson's motmot, Momotus lessonii (A)
- Rufous motmot, Baryphthengus martii
- Keel-billed motmot, Electron carinatum (vulnerable)
- Broad-billed motmot, Electron platyrhynchum
- Turquoise-browed motmot, Eumomota superciliosa

== Kingfishers ==
Order: Coraciiformes Family: Alcedinidae

Kingfishers are medium-sized birds with large heads, long, pointed bills, short legs, and stubby tails.

- Ringed kingfisher, Megaceryle torquatus
- Belted kingfisher, Megaceryle alcyon
- Amazon kingfisher, Chloroceryle amazona
- American pygmy kingfisher, Chloroceryle aenea
- Green kingfisher, Chloroceryle americana
- Green-and-rufous kingfisher, Chloroceryle inda

== Puffbirds ==
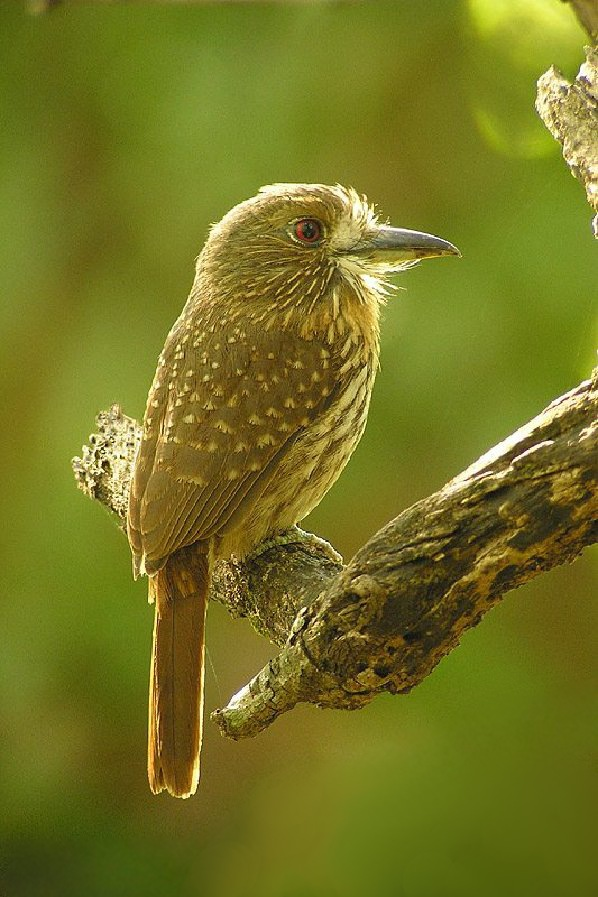
White-whiskered puffbird

Order: Piciformes Family: Bucconidae

The puffbirds are related to the jacamars and have the same range, but lack the iridescent colors of that family. They are mainly brown, rufous, or gray, with large heads and flattened bills with hooked tips. The loose abundant plumage and short tails makes them look stout and puffy, giving rise to the English common name of the family.

- White-necked puffbird, Notharchus hyperrhynchus
- White-whiskered puffbird, Malacoptila panamensis
- White-fronted nunbird, Monasa morphoeus

== Jacamars ==
Order: Piciformes Family: Galbulidae

The jacamars are near passerine birds from tropical South America, with a range that extends up to Mexico. They feed on insects caught on the wing, and are glossy, elegant birds with long bills and tails. In appearance and behavior they resemble the Old World bee-eaters, although they are more closely related to puffbirds.

- Rufous-tailed jacamar, Galbula ruficauda
- Great jacamar, Jacamerops aureus

== Toucans ==
Order: Piciformes Family: Ramphastidae

Toucans are near passerine birds from the Neotropics. They are brightly marked and have enormous colorful bills which in some species amount to half their body length.

- Northern emerald-toucanet, Aulacorhynchus prasinus
- Collared aracari, Pteroglossus torquatus
- Yellow-eared toucanet, Selenidera spectabilis
- Keel-billed toucan, Ramphastos sulfuratus
- Yellow-throated toucan, Ramphastos ambiguus (near-threatened)

== Woodpeckers ==
Order: Piciformes Family: Picidae

Woodpeckers are small to medium-sized birds with chisel-like beaks, short legs, stiff tails, and long tongues used for capturing insects. Some species have feet with two toes pointing forward and two backward, while several species have only three toes. Many woodpeckers have the habit of tapping noisily on tree trunks with their beaks.

- Olivaceous piculet, Picumnus olivaceus
- Acorn woodpecker, Melanerpes formicivorus
- Black-cheeked woodpecker, Melanerpes pucherani
- Yucatan woodpecker, Melanerpes pygmaeus
- Hoffmann's woodpecker, Melanerpes hoffmannii
- Golden-fronted woodpecker, Melanerpes aurifrons
- Yellow-bellied sapsucker, Sphyrapicus varius
- Ladder-backed woodpecker, Dryobates scalaris
- Hairy woodpecker, Dryobates villosus
- Smoky-brown woodpecker, Dryobates fumigatus
- Rufous-winged woodpecker, Piculus simplex
- Golden-olive woodpecker, Colaptes rubiginosus
- Northern flicker, Colaptes auratus
- Chestnut-colored woodpecker, Celeus castaneus
- Lineated woodpecker, Dryocopus lineatus
- Pale-billed woodpecker, Campephilus guatemalensis

== Falcons and caracaras ==
Order: Falconiformes Family: Falconidae

Falconidae is a family of diurnal birds of prey. They differ from hawks, eagles, and kites in that they kill with their beaks instead of their talons.

- Barred forest-falcon, Micrastur ruficollis
- Slaty-backed forest-falcon, Micrastur mirandollei
- Collared forest-falcon, Micrastur semitorquatus
- Red-throated caracara, Ibycter americanus
- Crested caracara, Caracara plancus
- Yellow-headed caracara, Milvago chimachima
- Laughing falcon, Herpetotheres cachinnans
- American kestrel, Falco sparverius
- Merlin, Falco columbarius
- Aplomado falcon, Falco femoralis
- Bat falcon, Falco rufigularis
- Orange-breasted falcon, Falco deiroleucus (extirpated?) (near-threatened)
- Peregrine falcon, Falco peregrinus

== New World and African parrots ==
Order: Psittaciformes Family: Psittacidae

Parrots are small to large birds with a characteristic curved beak. Their upper mandibles have slight mobility in the joint with the skull and they have a generally erect stance. All parrots are zygodactyl, having the four toes on each foot placed two at the front and two to the back.

- Olive-throated parakeet, Eupsittula nana
- Orange-fronted parakeet, Eupsittula canicularis
- Scarlet macaw, Ara macao
- Great green macaw, Ara ambigua (endangered)
- Green parakeet, Psittacara holochlorus
- Pacific parakeet, Psittacara strenuus
- Crimson-fronted parakeet, Psittacara finschi (A?) (H)
- Barred parakeet, Bolborhynchus lineola
- Orange-chinned parakeet, Brotogeris jugularis
- Brown-hooded parrot, Pionopsitta haematotis
- White-crowned parrot, Pionus senilis
- White-fronted parrot, Amazona albifrons
- Yellow-lored parrot, Amazona xantholora
- Red-lored parrot, Amazona autumnalis
- Mealy parrot, Amazona farinosa
- Yellow-headed parrot, Amazona oratrix (endangered)
- Yellow-naped parrot, Amazona auropalliata (endangered)

== Manakins ==
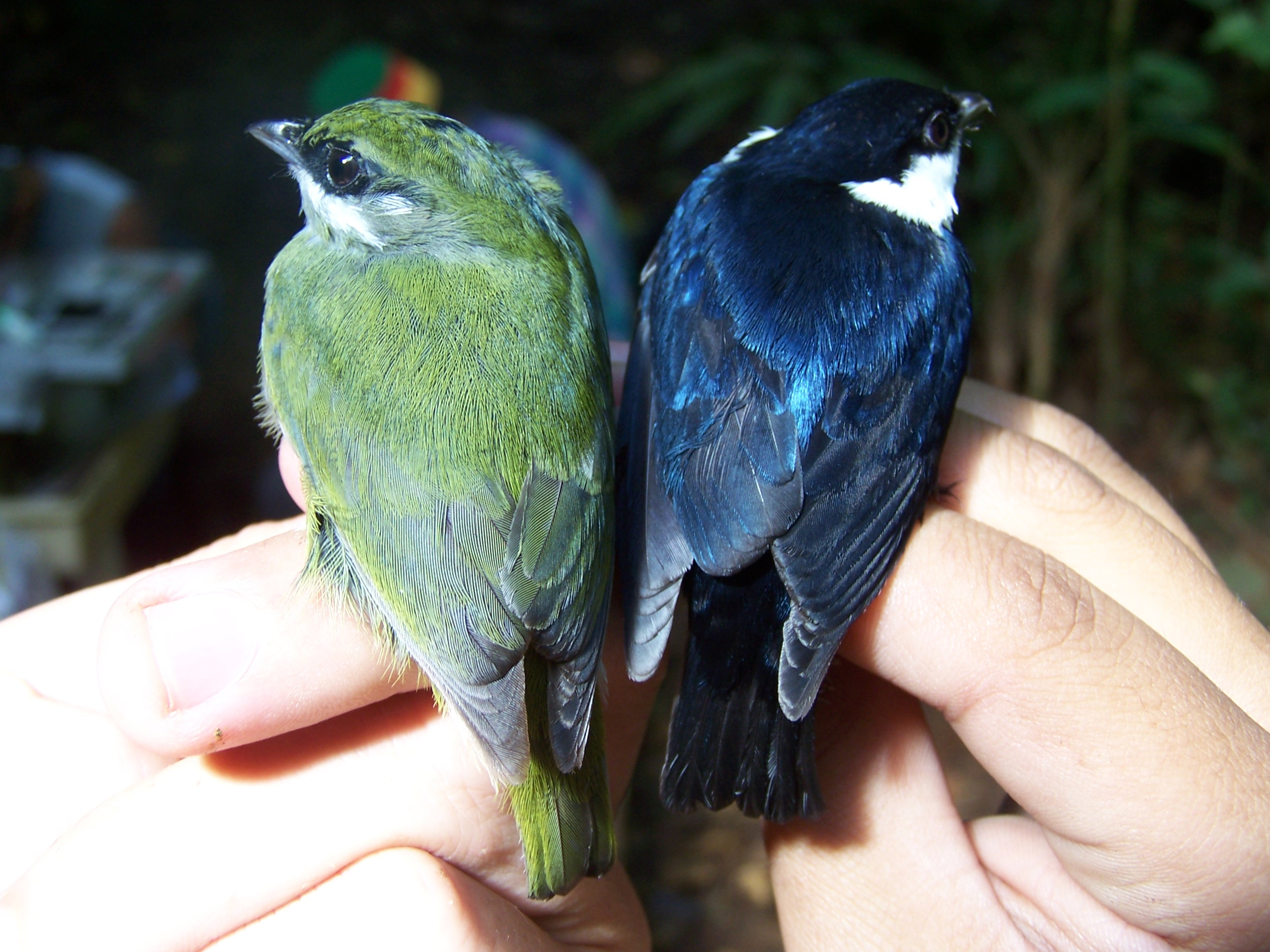
White-ruffed manakins - female (olive-green) and male (glossy blue-black)

Order: Passeriformes Family: Pipridae

The manakins are a clade of birds in the subtropical and tropical mainland of Central and South America, and Trinidad and Tobago. They are compact forest birds, the males typically being brightly colored, although the females of most species are duller and usually green-plumaged. Manakins feed on small fruits, berries and insects.

- Long-tailed manakin, Chiroxiphia linearis
- White-ruffed manakin, Corapipo altera
- White-collared manakin, Manacus candei
- Red-capped manakin, Ceratopipra mentalis

== Cotingas ==
Order: Passeriformes Family: Cotingidae

The cotingas are birds of forests or forest edges in tropical South America. Comparatively little is known about this diverse group, although all have broad bills with hooked tips, rounded wings, and strong legs. The males of many of the species are brightly colored or decorated with plumes or wattles.

- Lovely cotinga, Cotinga amabilis
- Rufous piha, Lipaugus unirufus
- Three-wattled bellbird, Procnias tricarunculata (vulnerable)
- Snowy cotinga, Carpodectes nitidus

== Tityras and allies ==
Order: Passeriformes Family: Tityridae

Tityridae are suboscine passerine birds found in forest and woodland in the Neotropics. The species in this family were formerly spread over the families Tyrannidae, Pipridae, and Cotingidae. They are small to medium-sized birds. They do not have the sophisticated vocal capabilities of the songbirds. Most, but not all, have plain coloring.

- Northern schiffornis, Schiffornis veraepacis
- Speckled mourner, Laniocera rufescens
- Masked tityra, Tityra semifasciata
- Black-crowned tityra, Tityra inquisitor
- Cinnamon becard, Pachyramphus cinnamomeus
- White-winged becard, Pachyramphus polychopterus
- Gray-collared becard, Pachyramphus major
- Rose-throated becard, Pachyramphus aglaiae

== Royal flycatcher and allies ==
Order: Passeriformes Family: Onychorhynchidae

The members of this small family, created in 2018, were formerly considered to be tyrant flycatchers, family Tyrannidae.

- Royal flycatcher, Onychorhynchus mexicanus
- Ruddy-tailed flycatcher, Terenotriccus erythrurus
- Sulphur-rumped flycatcher, Myiobius sulphureipygius

== Tyrant flycatchers ==
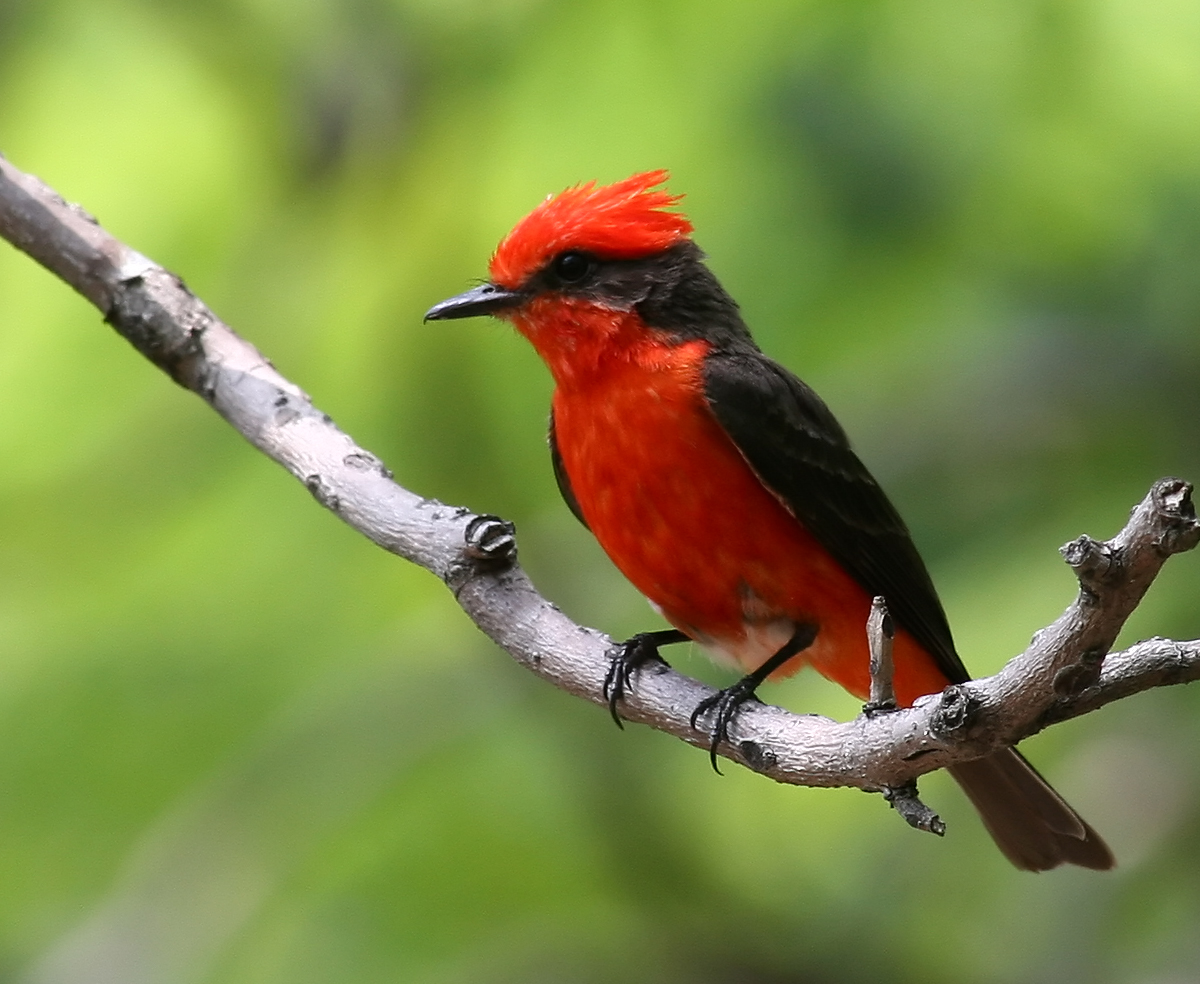
Vermilion flycatcher

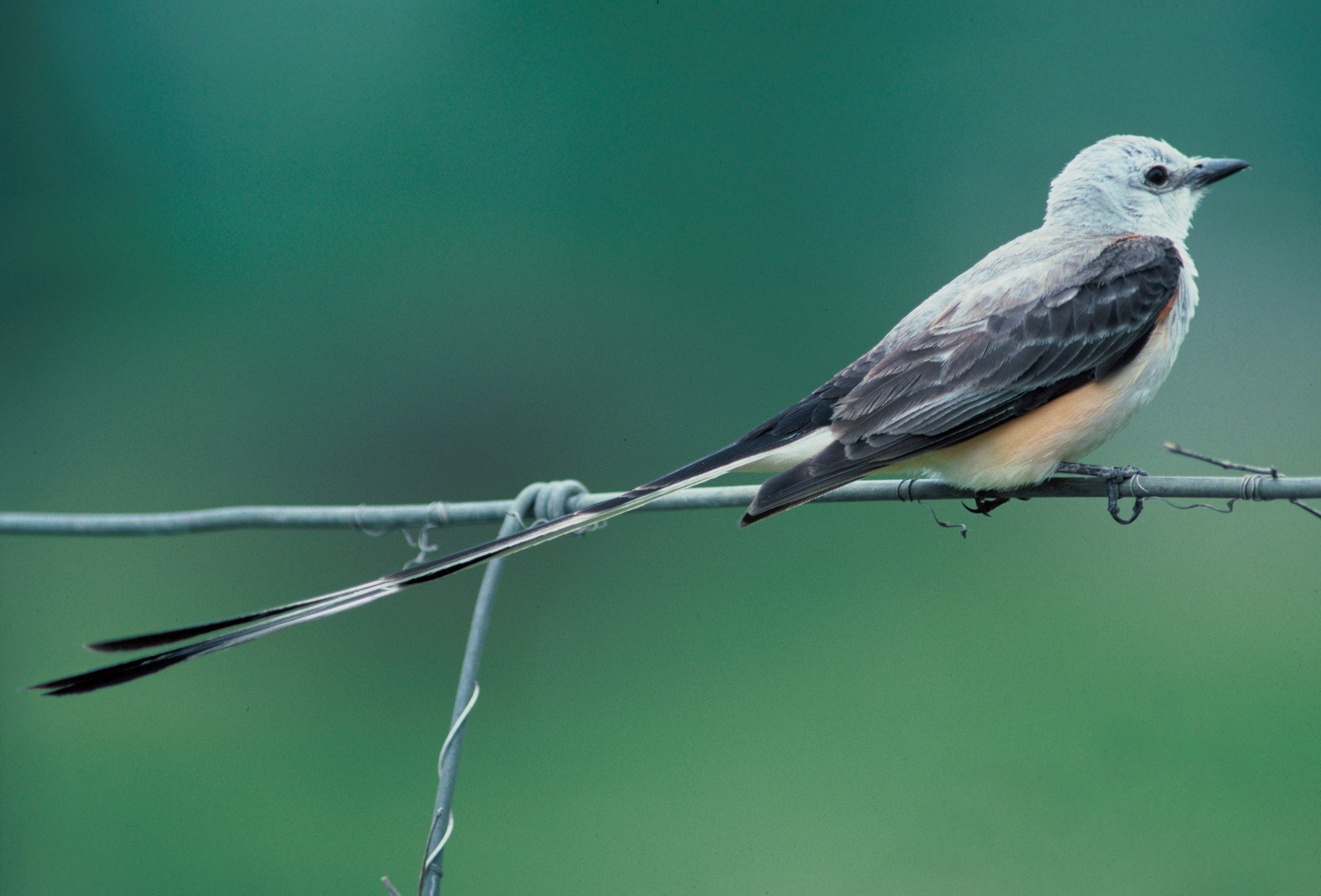
Scissor-tailed flycatcher

Order: Passeriformes Family: Tyrannidae

Tyrant flycatchers are passerine birds which occur throughout North and South America. They superficially resemble the Old World flycatchers, but are more robust and have stronger bills. They do not have the sophisticated vocal capabilities of the songbirds. Most, but not all, have plain coloring. As the name implies, most are insectivorous.

- Gray-headed piprites, Piprites griseiceps (the ASHO considers P. griseiceps to be incertae sedis)
- Stub-tailed spadebill, Platyrinchus cancrominus
- Golden-crowned spadebill, Platyrinchus coronatus
- Ochre-bellied flycatcher, Mionectes oleagineus
- Sepia-capped flycatcher, Leptopogon amaurocephalus
- Scale-crested pygmy-tyrant, Lophotriccus pileatus
- Northern bentbill, Oncostoma cinereigulare
- Slate-headed tody-flycatcher, Poecilotriccus sylvia
- Common tody-flycatcher, Todirostrum cinereum
- Black-headed tody-flycatcher, Todirostrum nigriceps
- Eye-ringed flatbill, Rhynchocyclus brevirostris
- Yellow-olive flycatcher, Tolmomyias sulphurescens
- Yellow-bellied tyrannulet, Ornithion semiflavum
- Northern beardless-tyrannulet, Camptostoma imberbe
- Yellow tyrannulet, Capsiempis flaveola
- Greenish elaenia, Myiopagis viridicata
- Yellow-bellied elaenia, Elaenia flavogaster
- Mountain elaenia, Elaenia frantzii
- Guatemalan tyrannulet, Zimmerius vilissimus (A)
- Mistletoe tyrannulet, Zimmerius parvus
- Bright-rumped attila, Attila spadiceus
- Rufous mourner, Rhytipterna holerythra
- Sad flycatcher, Myiarchus barbirostris
- Dusky-capped flycatcher, Myiarchus tuberculifer
- Ash-throated flycatcher, Myiarchus cinerascens
- Nutting's flycatcher, Myiarchus nuttingi
- Great crested flycatcher, Myiarchus crinitus
- Brown-crested flycatcher, Myiarchus tyrannulus
- Great kiskadee, Pitangus sulphuratus
- Boat-billed flycatcher, Megarynchus pitangua
- Social flycatcher, Myiozetetes similis
- Gray-capped flycatcher, Myiozetetes granadensis
- White-ringed flycatcher, Conopias albovittatus
- Streaked flycatcher, Myiodynastes maculatus
- Sulphur-bellied flycatcher, Myiodynastes luteiventris
- Piratic flycatcher, Legatus leucophaius
- Tropical kingbird, Tyrannus melancholicus
- Couch's kingbird, Tyrannus couchii (A)
- Cassin's kingbird, Tyrannus vociferans
- Western kingbird, Tyrannus verticalis
- Eastern kingbird, Tyrannus tyrannus
- Gray kingbird, Tyrannus dominicensis
- Loggerhead kingbird, Tyrannus caudifasciatus (A)
- Scissor-tailed flycatcher, Tyrannus forficatus
- Fork-tailed flycatcher, Tyrannus savana
- Tawny-chested flycatcher, Aphanotriccus capitalis (vulnerable)
- Belted flycatcher, Xenotriccus callizonus (near-threatened)
- Tufted flycatcher, Mitrephanes phaeocercus
- Olive-sided flycatcher, Contopus cooperi (near-threatened)
- Greater pewee, Contopus pertinax
- Western wood-pewee, Contopus sordidulus
- Eastern wood-pewee, Contopus virens
- Tropical pewee, Contopus cinereus
- Yellow-bellied flycatcher, Empidonax flaviventris
- Acadian flycatcher, Empidonax virescens
- Alder flycatcher, Empidonax alnorum
- Willow flycatcher, Empidonax traillii
- White-throated flycatcher, Empidonax albigularis
- Least flycatcher, Empidonax minimus
- Hammond's flycatcher, Empidonax hammondii
- Yellowish flycatcher, Empidonax flavescens
- Buff-breasted flycatcher, Empidonax fulvifrons
- Black phoebe, Sayornis nigricans
- Vermilion flycatcher, Pyrocephalus rubinus
- Long-tailed tyrant, Colonia colonus

== Typical antbirds ==
Order: Passeriformes Family: Thamnophilidae

The antbirds are a large family of small passerine birds of subtropical and tropical Central and South America. They are forest birds which tend to feed on insects at or near the ground. A sizable minority of them specialize in following columns of army ants to eat small invertebrates that leave their hiding places to flee from the ants. Many species lack bright color, with brown, black, and white being the dominant tones.

- Fasciated antshrike, Cymbilaimus lineatus
- Great antshrike, Taraba major
- Barred antshrike, Thamnophilus doliatus
- Black-crowned antshrike, Thamnophilus atrinucha
- Russet antshrike, Thamnistes anabatinus
- Plain antvireo, Dysithamnus mentalis
- Streak-crowned antvireo, Dysithamnus striaticeps
- Checker-throated stipplethroat, Epinecrophylla fulviventris
- White-flanked antwren, Myrmotherula axillaris
- Slaty antwren, Myrmotherula schisticolor
- Dot-winged antwren, Microrhopias quixensis
- Dusky antbird, Cercomacroides tyrannina
- Bare-crowned antbird, Gymnocichla nudiceps
- Chestnut-backed antbird, Poliocrania exsul
- Spotted antbird, Hylophylax naevioides
- Bicolored antbird, Gymnopithys leucaspis
- Wing-banded antbird, Myrmornis torquata
- Ocellated antbird, Phaenostictus mcleannani

== Antpittas ==
Order: Passeriformes Family: Grallariidae

Antpittas resemble the true pittas with strong, longish legs, very short tails, and stout bills.

- Scaled antpitta, Grallaria guatimalensis
- Streak-chested antpitta, Hylopezus perspicillatus
- Thicket antpitta, Hylopezus dives

== Antthrushes ==
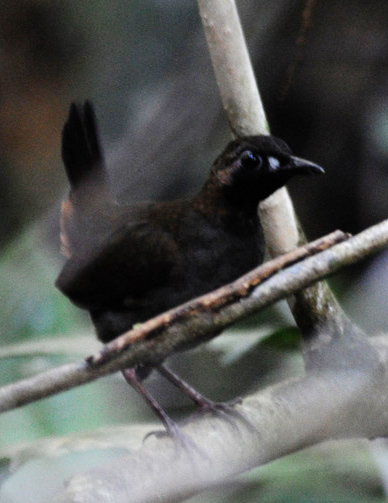
Black-faced antthrush

Order: Passeriformes Family: Formicariidae

Antthrushes resemble small rails with strong longish legs, very short tails, and stout bills.

- Mayan antthrush, Formicarius moniliger
- Black-faced antthrush, Formicarius analis

== Ovenbirds and woodcreepers ==
Order: Passeriformes Family: Furnariidae

Ovenbirds comprise a large family of small sub-oscine passerine bird species found in Central and South America. They are a diverse group of insectivores which gets its name from the elaborate "oven-like" clay nests built by some species, although others build stick nests or nest in tunnels or clefts in rock. The woodcreepers are brownish birds which maintain an upright vertical posture supported by their stiff tail vanes. They feed mainly on insects taken from tree trunks.

- Middle American leaftosser, Sclerurus mexicanus
- Scaly-throated leaftosser, Sclerurus guatemalensis
- Olivaceous woodcreeper, Sittasomus griseicapillus
- Long-tailed woodcreeper, Deconychura longicauda
- Ruddy woodcreeper, Dendrocincla homochroa
- Tawny-winged woodcreeper, Dendrocincla anabatina
- Plain-brown woodcreeper, Dendrocincla fuliginosa
- Wedge-billed woodcreeper, Glyphorynchus spirurus
- Northern barred-woodcreeper, Dendrocolaptes sanctithomae
- Black-banded woodcreeper, Dendrocolaptes picumnus
- Strong-billed woodcreeper, Xiphocolaptes promeropirhynchus
- Cocoa woodcreeper, Xiphorhynchus susurrans
- Ivory-billed woodcreeper, Xiphorhynchus flavigaster
- Spotted woodcreeper, Xiphorhynchus erythropygius
- Streak-headed woodcreeper, Lepidocolaptes souleyetii
- Spot-crowned woodcreeper, Lepidocolaptes affinis
- Plain xenops, Xenops minutus
- Buff-throated foliage-gleaner, Automolus ochrolaemus
- Striped woodhaunter, Automolus subulatus
- Scaly-throated foliage-gleaner, Anabacerthia variegaticeps
- Ruddy foliage-gleaner, Clibanornis rubiginosus
- Slaty spinetail, Synallaxis brachyura
- Rufous-breasted spinetail, Synallaxis erythrothorax

== Vireos, shrike-babblers, and erpornis ==
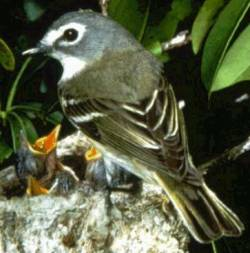
Blue-headed vireo

Order: Passeriformes Family: Vireonidae

The vireos are a group of small to medium-sized passerine birds. They are typically greenish in color and resemble wood warblers apart from their heavier bills.

- Rufous-browed peppershrike, Cyclarhis gujanensis
- Green shrike-vireo, Vireolanius pulchellus
- Tawny-crowned greenlet, Tunchiornis ochraceiceps
- Lesser greenlet, Pachysylvia decurtata
- White-eyed vireo, Vireo griseus
- Mangrove vireo, Vireo pallens
- Bell's vireo, Vireo bellii
- Hutton's vireo, Vireo huttoni (H)
- Yellow-throated vireo, Vireo flavifrons
- Blue-headed vireo, Vireo solitarius
- Plumbeous vireo, Vireo plumbeus
- Warbling vireo, Vireo gilvus
- Brown-capped vireo, Vireo leucophrys
- Philadelphia vireo, Vireo philadelphicus
- Red-eyed vireo, Vireo olivaceus
- Yellow-green vireo, Vireo flavoviridis
- Black-whiskered vireo, Vireo altiloquus (A)
- Yucatan vireo, Vireo magister

== Crows, jays, and magpies ==
Order: Passeriformes Family: Corvidae

The family Corvidae includes crows, ravens, jays, choughs, magpies, treepies, nutcrackers, and ground jays. Corvids are above average in size among the Passeriformes, and some of the larger species show high levels of intelligence.

- Black-throated jay, Cyanolyca pumilo
- Azure-hooded jay, Cyanolyca cucullata
- White-throated magpie-jay, Calocitta formosa
- Brown jay, Psilorhinus morio
- Green jay, Cyanocorax yncas
- Bushy-crested jay, Cyanocorax melanocyaneus
- Steller's jay, Cyanocitta stelleri
- Unicolored jay, Aphelocoma unicolor
- Common raven, Corvus corax

== Swallows ==
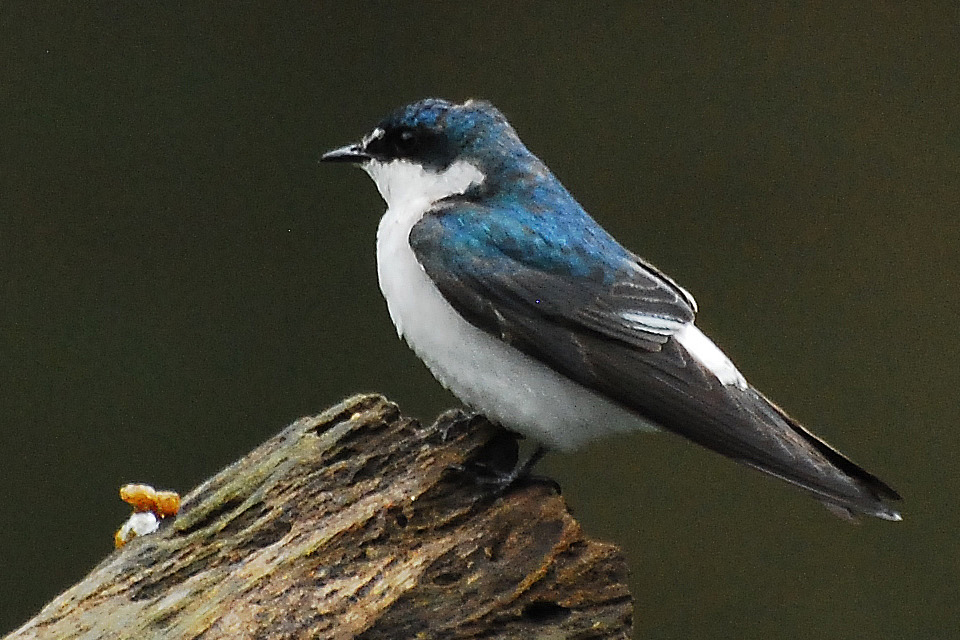
Mangrove swallow

Order: Passeriformes Family: Hirundinidae

The family Hirundinidae is adapted to aerial feeding. They have a slender streamlined body, long pointed wings, and a short bill with a wide gape. The feet are adapted to perching rather than walking, and the front toes are partially joined at the base.

- Bank swallow, Riparia riparia
- Tree swallow, Tachycineta bicolor
- Violet-green swallow, Tachycineta thalassina
- Mangrove swallow, Tachycineta albilinea
- Black-capped swallow, Atticora pileata
- Northern rough-winged swallow, Stelgidopteryx serripennis
- Southern rough-winged swallow, Stelgidopteryx ruficollis
- Purple martin, Progne subis
- Gray-breasted martin, Progne chalybea
- Sinaloa martin, Progne sinaloae (A) (vulnerable)
- Cuban martin, Progne cryptoleuca (A)
- Barn swallow, Hirundo rustica
- Cliff swallow, Petrochelidon pyrrhonota
- Cave swallow, Petrochelidon fulva

== Waxwings ==
Order: Passeriformes Family: Bombycillidae

The waxwings are a group of passerine birds with soft silky plumage and unique red tips to some of the wing feathers. In the Bohemian and cedar waxwings, these tips look like sealing wax and give the group its name. These are arboreal birds of northern forests. They live on insects in summer and berries in winter.

- Cedar waxwing, Bombycilla cedrorum

== Treecreepers ==
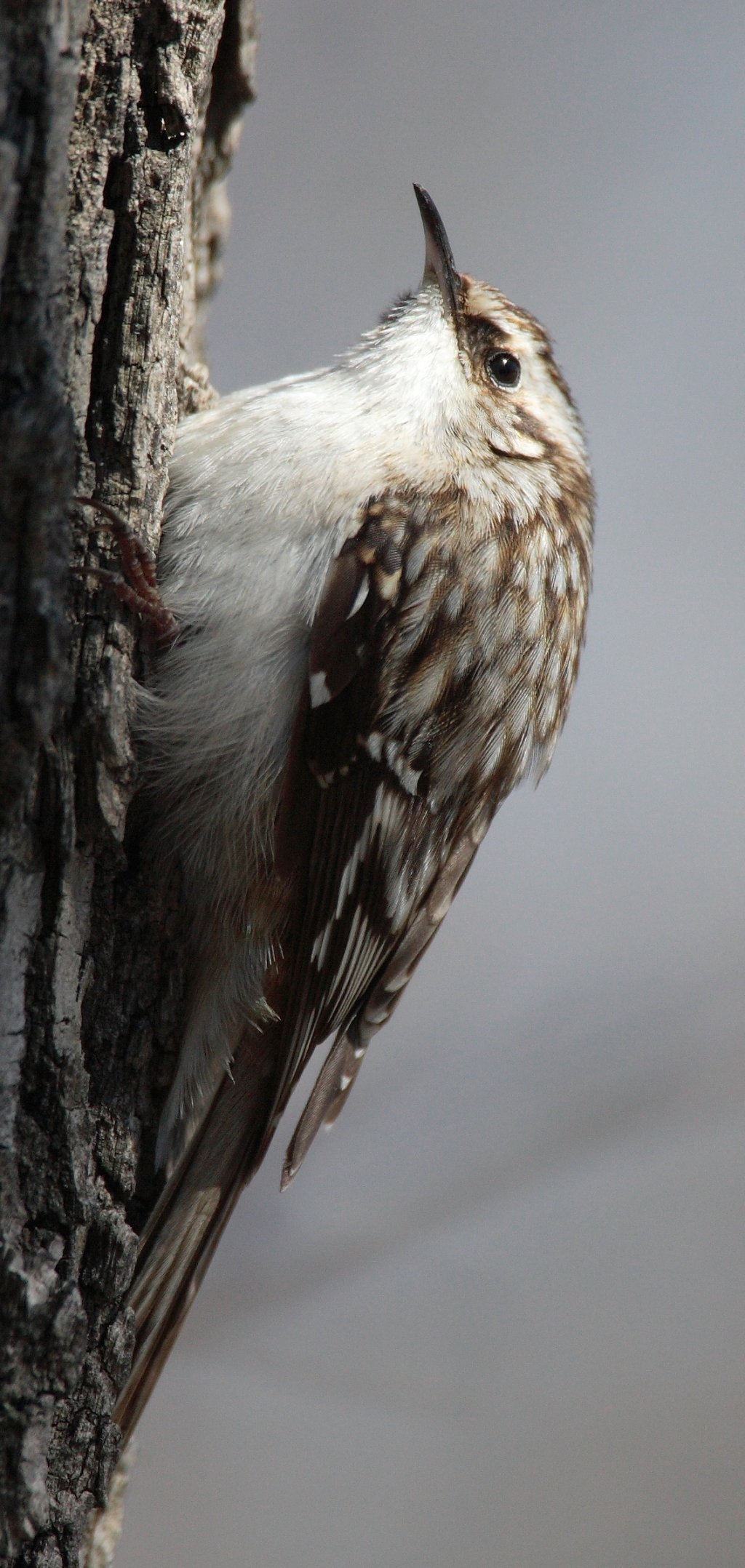
Brown creeper

Order: Passeriformes Family: Certhiidae

Treecreepers are small woodland birds, brown above and white below. They have thin, pointed, down-curved bills which they use to extricate insects from bark. They have stiff tail feathers, like woodpeckers, which they use to support themselves on vertical trees.

- Brown creeper, Certhia americana

== Gnatcatchers ==
Order: Passeriformes Family: Polioptilidae

These dainty birds resemble Old World warblers in their build and habits, moving restlessly through the foliage seeking insects. The gnatcatchers and gnatwrens are mainly soft bluish gray in color and have the typical insectivore's long sharp bill. They are birds of fairly open woodland or scrub which nest in bushes or trees.

- Long-billed gnatwren, Ramphocaenus melanurus
- Slate-throated gnatcatcher, Polioptila schistaceigula (A)
- White-browed gnatcatcher, Polioptila bilineata
- Blue-gray gnatcatcher, Polioptila caerulea
- White-lored gnatcatcher, Polioptila albiloris

== Wrens ==
Order: Passeriformes Family: Troglodytidae

The wrens are mainly small and inconspicuous except for their loud songs. These birds have short wings and thin down-turned bills. Several species often hold their tails upright. All are insectivorous.

- Rock wren, Salpinctes obsoletus
- Nightingale wren, Microcerculus philomela
- House wren, Troglodytes aedon
- Rufous-browed wren, Troglodytes rufociliatus
- Grass wren, Cistothorus platensis
- Carolina wren, Thryothorus ludovicianus
- Band-backed wren, Campylorhynchus zonatus
- Rufous-naped wren, Campylorhynchus rufinucha
- Spot-breasted wren, Pheugopedius maculipectus
- Black-throated wren, Pheugopedius atrogularis
- Banded wren, Thryophilus pleurostictus
- Rufous-and-white wren, Thryophilus rufalbus
- Stripe-breasted wren, Cantorchilus thoracicus
- Cabanis's wren, Cantorchilus modestus
- Bay wren, Cantorchilus nigricapillus (H)
- White-bellied wren, Uropsila leucogastra
- White-breasted wood-wren, Henicorhina leucosticta
- Gray-breasted wood-wren, Henicorhina leucophrys
- Song wren, Cyphorhinus phaeocephalus

== Mockingbirds and thrashers ==
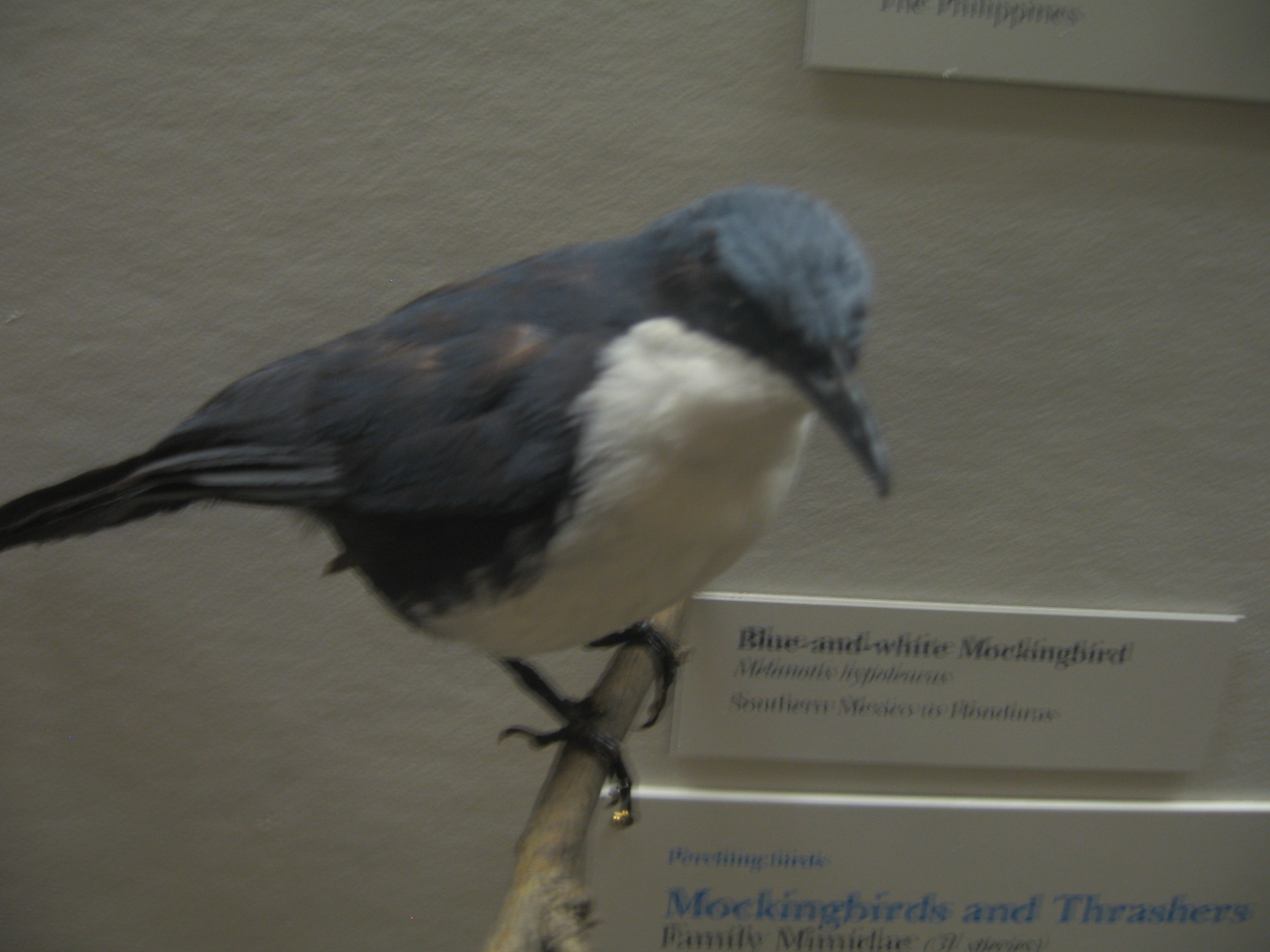
Blue-and-white mockingbird

Order: Passeriformes Family: Mimidae

The mimids are a family of passerine birds that includes thrashers, mockingbirds, tremblers, and the New World catbirds. These birds are notable for their vocalizations, especially their ability to mimic a wide variety of birds and other sounds heard outdoors. Their coloring tends towards dull-grays and browns.

- Blue-and-white mockingbird, Melanotis hypoleucus
- Black catbird, Melanoptila glabrirostris (near-threatened)
- Gray catbird, Dumetella carolinensis
- Tropical mockingbird, Mimus gilvus
- Northern mockingbird, Mimus polyglottos (A)

== Dippers ==
Order: Passeriformes Family: Cinclidae

Dippers are a group of perching birds whose habitat includes aquatic environments in the Americas, Europe, and Asia. They are named for their bobbing or dipping movements.

- American dipper, Cinclus mexicanus

== Thrushes and allies ==
Order: Passeriformes Family: Turdidae

The thrushes are a group of passerine birds that occur mainly in the Old World. They are plump, soft plumaged, small to medium-sized insectivores or sometimes omnivores, often feeding on the ground. Many have attractive songs.

- Eastern bluebird, Sialia sialis
- Brown-backed solitaire, Myadestes occidentalis
- Slate-colored solitaire, Myadestes unicolor
- Orange-billed nightingale-thrush, Catharus aurantiirostris
- Ruddy-capped nightingale-thrush, Catharus frantzii
- Black-headed nightingale-thrush, Catharus mexicanus
- Yellow-throated nightingale-thrush, Catharus dryas
- Veery, Catharus fuscescens
- Gray-cheeked thrush, Catharus minimus
- Swainson's thrush, Catharus ustulatus
- Hermit thrush, Catharus guttatus (A)
- Wood thrush, Hylocichla mustelina (near-threatened)
- Black thrush, Turdus infuscatus
- Mountain thrush, Turdus plebejus
- Clay-colored thrush, Turdus grayi
- White-throated thrush, Turdus assimilis
- Rufous-collared robin, Turdus rufitorques
- Western red-legged thrush, Turdus plumbeus (extirpated)

== Olive warbler ==
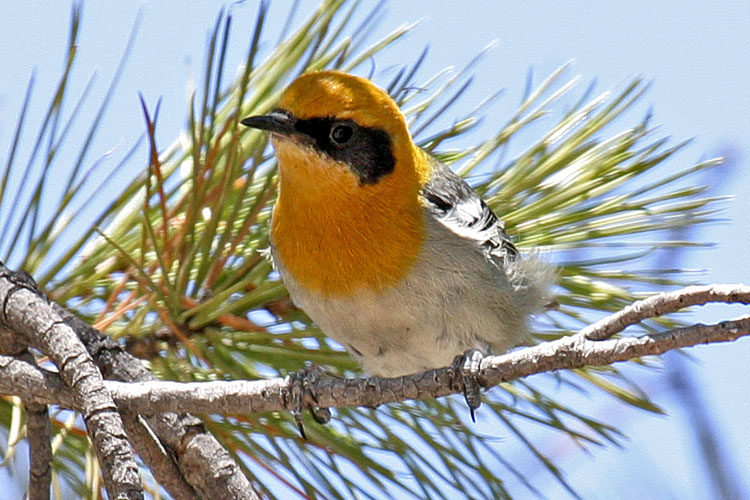
Olive warbler

Order: Passeriformes Family: Peucedramidae

The olive warbler is a small passerine bird, the only member of the family Peucedramidae. It is a long-winged bird with a gray body and wings with some olive-green and two white bars. The male's head and breast are orange, the female's yellow.

- Olive warbler, Peucedramus taeniatus

== Waxbills and allies ==
Order: Passeriformes Family: Estrildidae

The members of this family are small passerine birds native to the Old World tropics. They are gregarious and often colonial seed eaters with short thick but pointed bills. They are all similar in structure and habits, but have wide variation in plumage colors and patterns.

- Scaly-breasted munia, Lonchura punctulata (I)
- Tricolored munia, Lonchura malacca (I)

== Old World sparrows ==
Order: Passeriformes Family: Passeridae

Sparrows are small passerine birds. In general, sparrows tend to be small, plump, brown or gray birds with short tails and short powerful beaks. Sparrows are seed eaters, but they also consume small insects.

- House sparrow, Passer domesticus (I)

== Wagtails and pipits ==
Order: Passeriformes Family: Motacillidae

Motacillidae is a family of small passerine birds with medium to long tails. They include the wagtails, longclaws, and pipits. They are slender, ground feeding insectivores of open country.

- American pipit, Anthus rubescens (A)

== Finches, euphonias, and allies ==
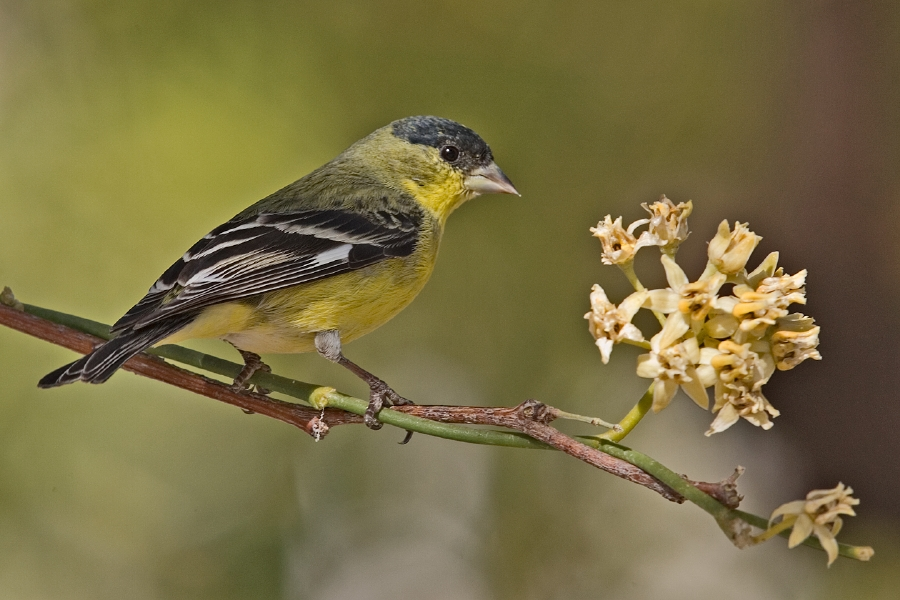
Lesser goldfinch

Order: Passeriformes Family: Fringillidae

Finches are seed-eating passerine birds that are small to moderately large and have a strong beak, usually conical and in some species very large. All have twelve tail feathers and nine primaries. These birds have a bouncing flight with alternating bouts of flapping and gliding on closed wings, and most sing well.

- Elegant euphonia, Chlorophonia elegantissima
- Blue-crowned chlorophonia, Chlorophonia occipitalis
- Scrub euphonia, Euphonia affinis
- Yellow-crowned euphonia, Euphonia luteicapilla
- White-vented euphonia, Euphonia minuta
- Yellow-throated euphonia, Euphonia hirundinacea
- Olive-backed euphonia, Euphonia gouldi
- Hooded grosbeak, Coccothraustes abeillei
- Red crossbill, Loxia curvirostra
- Black-headed siskin, Spinus notata
- Lesser goldfinch, Spinus psaltria

== Thrush-tanager ==
Order: Passeriformes Family: Rhodinocichlidae

This species was historically placed in family Thraupidae. It was placed in its own family in 2017.

- Rosy thrush-tanager, Rhodinocichla rosea (A)

== New World sparrows ==
Order: Passeriformes Family: Passerellidae

Until 2017, these species were considered part of the family Emberizidae. Most of the species are known as sparrows, but these birds are not closely related to the Old World sparrows which are in the family Passeridae. Many of these have distinctive head patterns.

- Common chlorospingus, Chlorospingus flavopectus
- Stripe-headed sparrow, Peucaea ruficauda
- Botteri's sparrow, Peucaea botterii
- Grasshopper sparrow, Ammodramus savannarum
- Green-backed sparrow, Arremonops chloronotus
- Black-striped sparrow, Arremonops conirostris
- Lark sparrow, Chondestes grammacus (A)
- Chipping sparrow, Spizella passerina
- Clay-colored sparrow, Spizella pallida (A)
- Orange-billed sparrow, Arremon aurantiirostris
- Chestnut-capped brushfinch, Buarremon brunneinucha
- Rufous-collared sparrow, Zonotrichia capensis
- White-crowned sparrow, Zonotrichia leucophrys (A)
- Savannah sparrow, Passerculus sandwichensis
- Lincoln's sparrow, Melospiza lincolnii
- White-eared ground-sparrow, Melozone leucotis
- White-faced ground-sparrow, Melozone biarcuata
- Rusty sparrow, Aimophila rufescens
- White-naped brushfinch, Atlapetes albinucha

== Yellow-breasted chat ==
Order: Passeriformes Family: Icteriidae

This species was historically placed in the wood-warblers (Parulidae) but nonetheless most authorities were unsure if it belonged there. It was placed in its own family in 2017.

- Yellow-breasted chat, Icteria virens

== Troupials and allies ==
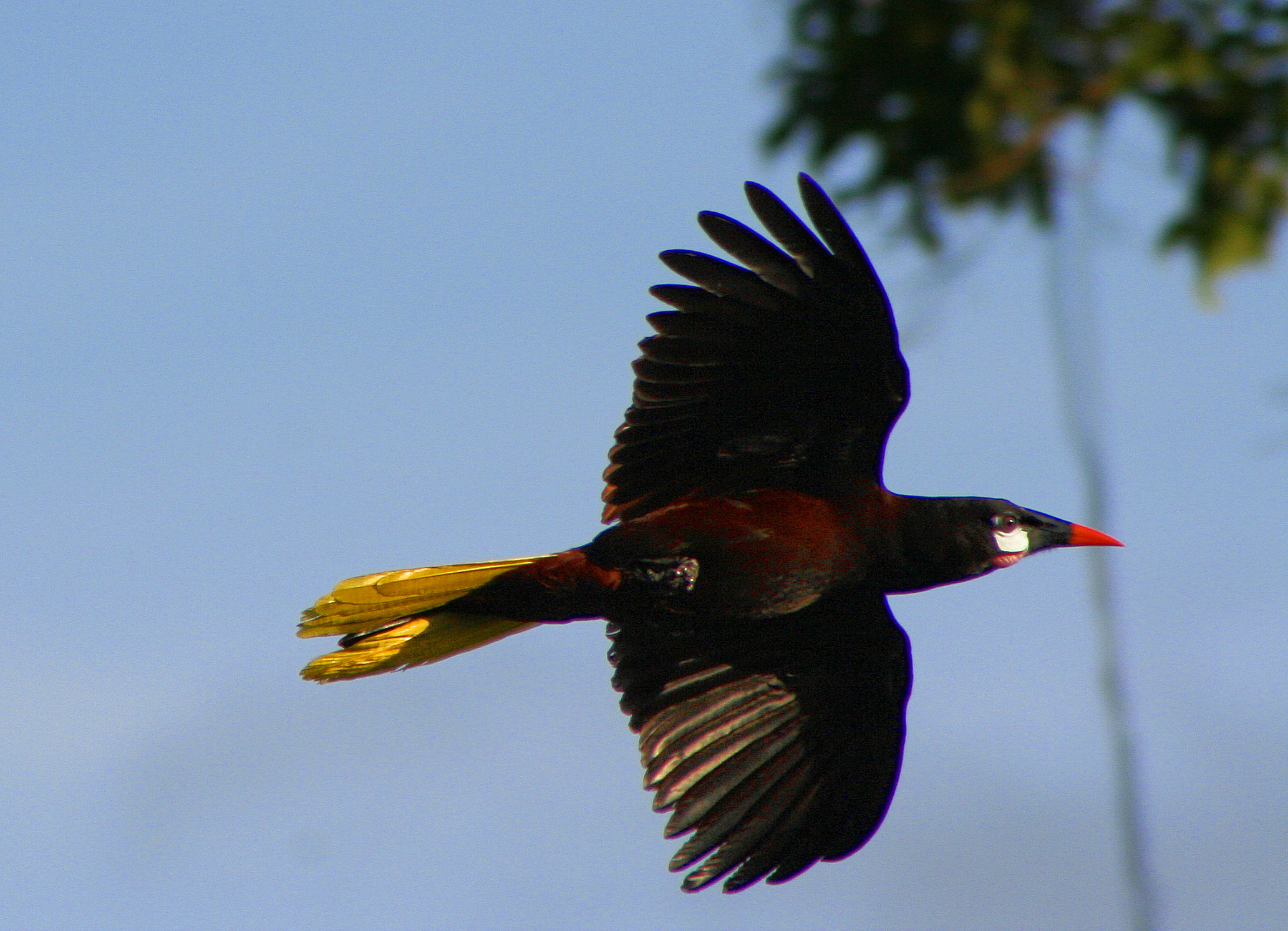
Montezuma oropendola

Order: Passeriformes Family: Icteridae

The icterids are a group of small to medium-sized, often colorful, passerine birds restricted to the New World and include the grackles, New World blackbirds, and New World orioles. Most species have black as the predominant plumage color, often enlivened by yellow, orange, or red.

- Bobolink, Dolichonyx oryzivorus
- Eastern meadowlark, Sturnella magna (near-threatened)
- Yellow-billed cacique, Amblycercus holosericeus
- Chestnut-headed oropendola, Psarocolius wagleri
- Montezuma oropendola, Gymnostinops montezuma
- Scarlet-rumped cacique, Cacicus uropygialis
- Black-vented oriole, Icterus wagleri
- Bar-winged oriole, Icterus maculialatus
- Black-cowled oriole, Icterus prosthemelas
- Orchard oriole, Icterus spurius
- Yellow-backed oriole, Icterus chrysater
- Yellow-tailed oriole, Icterus mesomelas
- Streak-backed oriole, Icterus pustulatus
- Spot-breasted oriole, Icterus pectoralis
- Altamira oriole, Icterus gularis
- Baltimore oriole, Icterus galbula
- Red-winged blackbird, Agelaius phoeniceus
- Bronzed cowbird, Molothrus aeneus
- Giant cowbird, Molothrus oryzivorus
- Melodious blackbird, Dives dives
- Great-tailed grackle, Quiscalus mexicanus

== New World warblers ==
Order: Passeriformes Family: Parulidae

The wood-warblers are a group of small, often colorful, passerine birds restricted to the New World. Most are arboreal, but some are terrestrial. Most members of this family are insectivores.

- Ovenbird, Seiurus aurocapilla
- Worm-eating warbler, Helmitheros vermivorum
- Louisiana waterthrush, Parkesia motacilla
- Northern waterthrush, Parkesia noveboracensis
- Golden-winged warbler, Vermivora chrysoptera (near-threatened)
- Blue-winged warbler, Vermivora cyanoptera
- Black-and-white warbler, Mniotilta varia
- Prothonotary warbler, Protonotaria citrea
- Swainson's warbler, Limnothlypis swainsonii
- Crescent-chested warbler, Leiothlypis superciliosa
- Tennessee warbler, Leiothlypis peregrina
- Orange-crowned warbler, Leiothlypis celata
- Nashville warbler, Leiothlypis ruficapilla
- Connecticut warbler, Oporornis agilis (A)
- Gray-crowned yellowthroat, Geothlypis poliocephala
- MacGillivray's warbler, Geothlypis tolmiei
- Mourning warbler, Geothlypis philadelphia
- Kentucky warbler, Geothlypis formosa
- Olive-crowned yellowthroat, Geothlypis semiflava
- Common yellowthroat, Geothlypis trichas
- American redstart, Setophaga ruticilla
- Cape May warbler, Setophaga tigrina
- Cerulean warbler, Setophaga cerulea (vulnerable)
- Hooded warbler, Setophaga citrina
- Northern parula, Setophaga americana
- Tropical parula, Setophaga pitiayumi
- Magnolia warbler, Setophaga magnolia
- Bay-breasted warbler, Setophaga castanea
- Blackburnian warbler, Setophaga fusca
- Yellow warbler, Setophaga petechia
- Chestnut-sided warbler, Setophaga pensylvanica
- Blackpoll warbler, Setophaga striata (near-threatened)
- Black-throated blue warbler, Setophaga caerulescens
- Palm warbler, Setophaga palmarum
- Pine warbler, Setophaga pinus
- Yellow-rumped warbler, Setophaga coronata
- Yellow-throated warbler, Setophaga dominica
- Vitelline warbler, Setophaga vitellina (near-threatened)
- Prairie warbler, Setophaga discolor
- Grace's warbler, Setophaga graciae
- Townsend's warbler, Setophaga townsendi
- Hermit warbler, Setophaga occidentalis
- Golden-cheeked warbler, Setophaga chrysoparia (endangered)
- Black-throated green warbler, Setophaga virens
- Fan-tailed warbler, Basileuterus lachrymosus
- Rufous-capped warbler, Basileuterus rufifrons
- Chestnut-capped warbler, Basileuterus delattrii
- Golden-browed warbler, Basileuterus belli
- Golden-crowned warbler, Basileuterus culicivorus
- Buff-rumped warbler, Myiothlypis fulvicauda
- Canada warbler, Cardellina canadensis
- Wilson's warbler, Cardellina pusilla
- Red-faced warbler, Cardellina rubrifrons
- Painted redstart, Myioborus pictus
- Slate-throated redstart, Myioborus miniatus

== Cardinals and allies ==
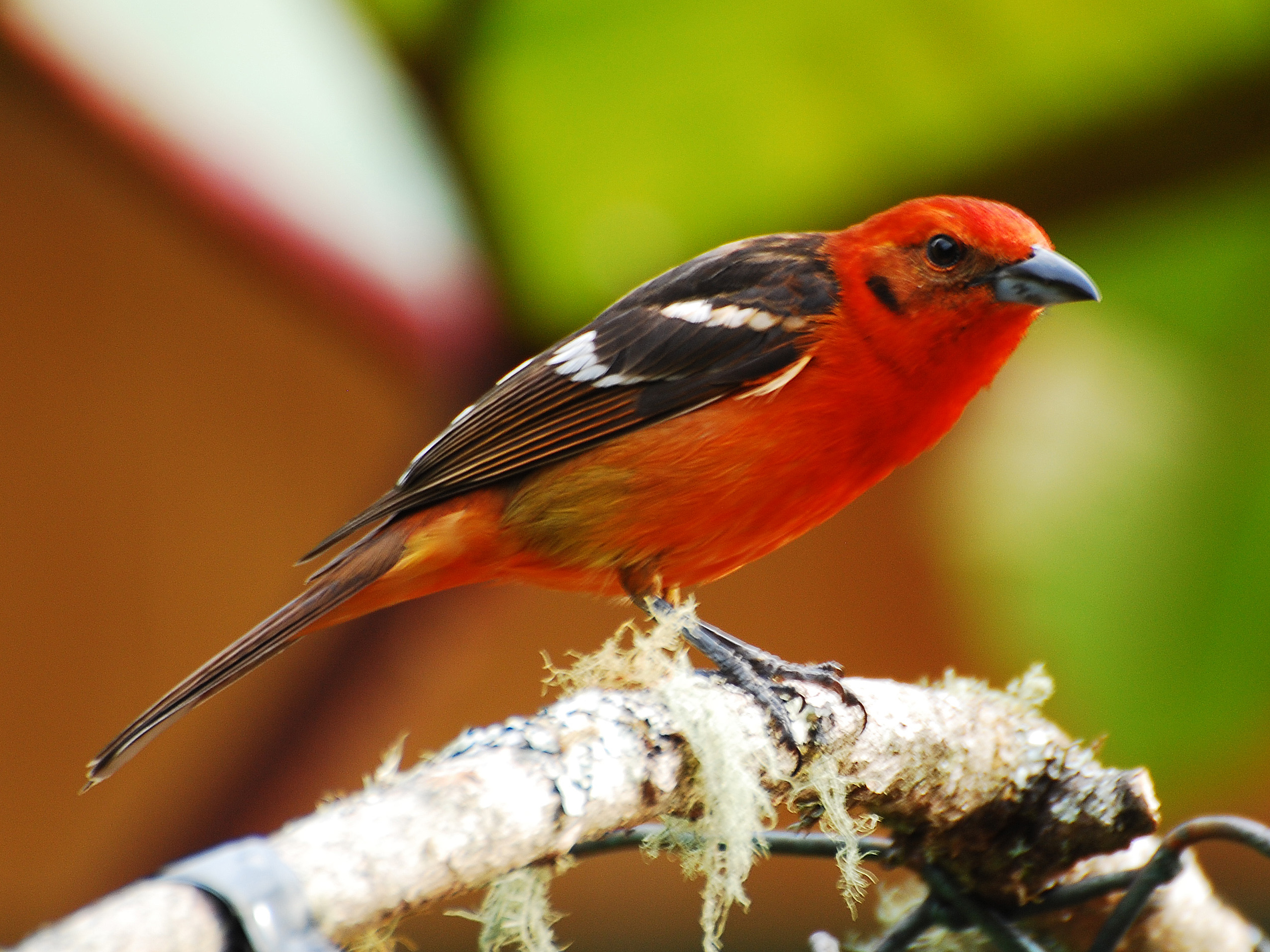
Flame-colored tanager

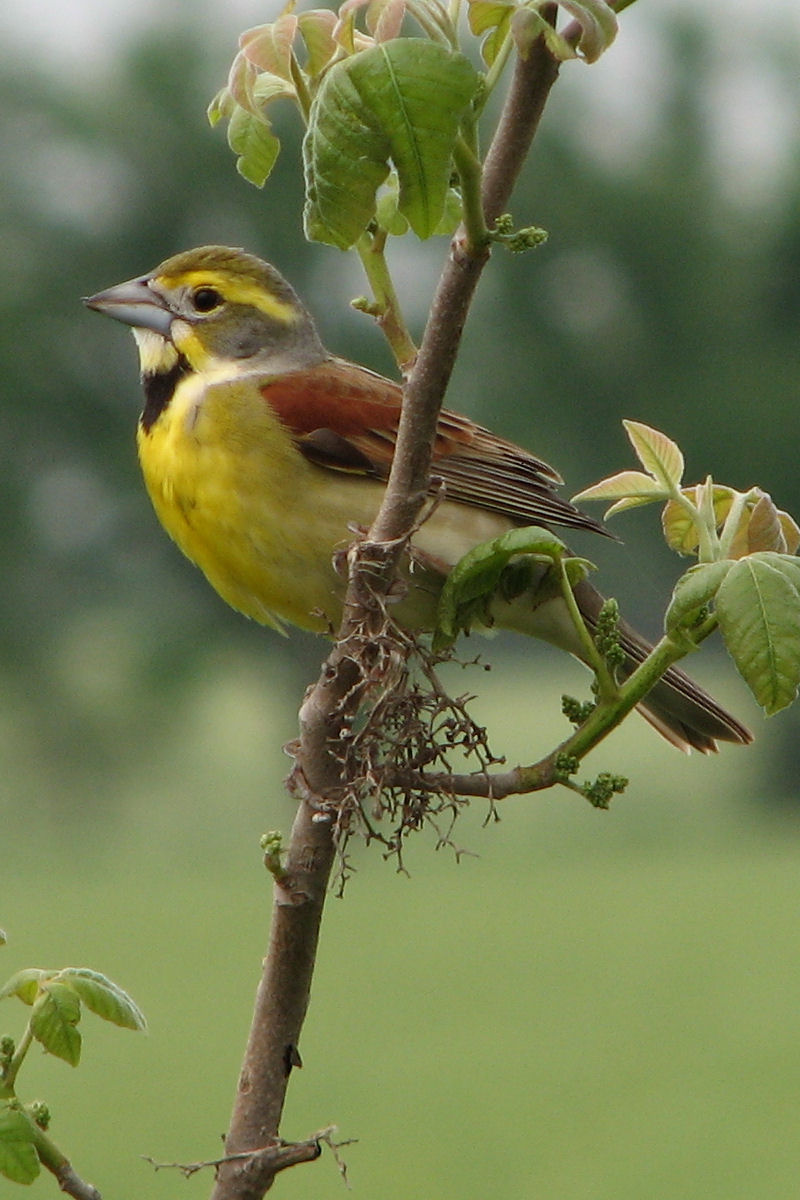
Dickcissel

Order: Passeriformes Family: Cardinalidae

The cardinals are a family of passerines that are robust seed-eating birds with strong bills. They are typically associated with open woodland. The sexes usually have distinct plumages.

- Hepatic tanager, Piranga flava
- Summer tanager, Piranga rubra
- Scarlet tanager, Piranga olivacea
- Western tanager, Piranga ludoviciana
- Flame-colored tanager, Piranga bidentata
- White-winged tanager, Piranga leucoptera
- Red-crowned ant-tanager, Habia rubica
- Red-throated ant-tanager, Habia fuscicauda
- Carmiol's tanager, Chlorothraupis carmioli
- Black-faced grosbeak, Caryothraustes poliogaster
- Northern cardinal, Cardinalis cardinalis
- Rose-breasted grosbeak, Pheucticus ludovicianus
- Black-headed grosbeak, Pheucticus melanocephalus
- Blue seedeater, Amaurospiza concolor
- Blue-black grosbeak, Cyanoloxia cyanoides
- Blue bunting, Cyanocompsa parellina
- Blue grosbeak, Passerina caerulea
- Indigo bunting, Passerina cyanea
- Painted bunting, Passerina ciris
- Dickcissel, Spiza americana

== Tanagers and allies ==
Order: Passeriformes Family: Thraupidae

The tanagers are a large group of small to medium-sized passerine birds restricted to the New World, mainly in the tropics. Many species are brightly colored. As a family they are omnivorous, but individual species specialize in eating fruits, seeds, insects, or other types of food. Most have short, rounded wings.

- Golden-hooded tanager, Stilpnia larvata
- Blue-gray tanager, Thraupis episcopus
- Yellow-winged tanager, Thraupis abbas
- Palm tanager, Thraupis palmarum (A?) (H)
- Rufous-winged tanager, Tangara lavinia
- Saffron finch, Sicalis flaveola (A)
- Grassland yellow-finch, Sicalis luteola
- Slaty finch, Haplospiza rustica
- Cinnamon-bellied flowerpiercer, Diglossa baritula
- Green honeycreeper, Chlorophanes spiza
- Blue-black grassquit, Volatinia jacarina
- Gray-headed tanager, Eucometis penicillata
- White-shouldered tanager, Loriotus luctuosus
- Tawny-crested tanager, Tachyphonus delatrii
- Black-throated shrike-tanager, Lanio aurantius
- White-throated shrike-tanager, Lanio leucothorax
- Crimson-collared tanager, Ramphocelus sanguinolentus
- Scarlet-rumped tanager, Ramphocelus passerinii
- Shining honeycreeper, Cyanerpes lucidus
- Red-legged honeycreeper, Cyanerpes cyaneus
- Blue dacnis, Dacnis cayana
- Bananaquit, Coereba flaveola
- Yellow-faced grassquit, Tiaris olivaceus
- Thick-billed seed-finch, Sporophila funerea
- Nicaraguan seed-finch, Sporophila nuttingi (A)
- Variable seedeater, Sporophila corvina
- Slate-colored seedeater, Sporophila schistacea
- Morelet's seedeater, Sporophila morelleti
- Ruddy-breasted seedeater, Sporophila minuta
- Black-headed saltator, Saltator atriceps
- Buff-throated saltator, Saltator maximus
- Slate-colored grosbeak, Saltator grossus
- Cinnamon-bellied saltator, Saltator grandis

== See also ==
- List of birds
- Lists of birds by region
