= List of Apodiformes by population =

This is a list of Apodiformes species by global population. While numbers are estimates, they have been made by the experts in their fields. For more information on how these estimates were ascertained, see Wikipedia's articles on population biology and population ecology.

Members of Apodiformes include the swifts, treeswifts, and hummingbirds. Note that some ornithological authorities (e.g., IUCN/BirdLife International) no longer recognize Apodiformes, and place all members within Caprimulgiformes. However, Apodiformes is maintained as a separate order here to match IOC taxonomy (IOC World Bird List version 15.1). For more discussion of this taxonomic complex, see Strisores.

This list is not comprehensive, as not all Apodiformes have had their numbers quantified.

The IOC World Bird List (version 15.1) recognizes 480 species of Apodiformes, one of which is extinct.

One member of Apodiformes is extinct:

- Brace's emerald (Riccordia bracei) - went extinct circa 1877.

== Species by global population ==
Common name	Binomial name	Population	Status	Trend	Notes	Image
Turquoise-throated puffleg	Eriocnemis godini	1-49	CR	?	May be extinct; no confirmed records since only specimen was collected in 1850. Not classified as extinct due to unconfirmed record in 1976.	
Santa Marta sabrewing	Campylopterus phainopeplus	1-49	CR	▼	Very few records exist, with less than 5 confirmed sightings since 1946.	
Blue-throated hillstar	Oreotrochilus cyanolaemus	80-110	CR	▼	Subpopulations include 30-50 mature individuals in Cerro de Arcos and Moras, 30-40 in Guanazán and Burrourco, and <20 in Fierro Urco.	
Black-breasted puffleg	Eriocnemis nigrivestis	100-150	EN	▼		
Chilean woodstar	Eulidia yarrellii	210	CR	▼	Total population is estimated to be 316 individuals.	
Gorgeted puffleg	Eriocnemis isabellae	250-999	CR	▼	Total population is estimated to be 900 individuals.	
Short-crested coquette	Lophornis brachylophus	250-999	CR	▼	Total population is estimated to be 350-1,500 individuals.	
Perijá starfrontlet	Coeligena consita	250-999	EN	▼	Total population is estimated to be 375-1,499 individuals.	
Colorful puffleg	Eriocnemis mirabilis	250-999	EN	▼	Total population is estimated to be 350-1,500 individuals.	
Blue-bearded helmetcrest	Oxypogon cyanolaemus	250-999	EN	▼		
Grey-bellied comet	Taphrolesbia griseiventris	250-999	EN	▼	Total population is estimated to be 350-1,500 individuals.	
Buffy helmetcrest	Oxypogon stuebelii	250-999	VU	▼	Precautionary estimate for mature individuals, acknowledging some studies have estimated a population as high as 10,000 mature individuals.	
Glittering starfrontlet (Dusky starfrontlet)	Coeligena orina	250-2,499	EN	▼	Total population is estimated to be 1,554 individuals.	
Sapphire-bellied hummingbird	Chrysuronia lilliae	285-440	EN	▼	Total population was estimated in 2007 to be 1,050 individuals. Likely lower now due to further declines.	
Atiu swiftlet	Aerodramus sawtelli	340-400	VU	Steady		
Santa Marta blossomcrown	Anthocephala floriceps	500-2,500	VU	▼		
Oaxaca hummingbird	Eupherusa cyanophrys	600-1,700	EN	▼	Total population is estimated to be 1,000-2,499 individuals.	
Dark-rumped swift	Apus acuticauda	900-10,000	NT	Steady		
Long-tailed woodnymph	Thalurania watertonii	1,000-2,499	EN	▼		
Purple-backed sunbeam	Aglaeactis aliciae	1,000-2,499	VU	▼	Total population is estimated to be 1,500-4,000 individuals.	
Violet-throated metaltail	Metallura baroni	1,000-2,499	VU	▼		
Tres Marias hummingbird	Cyanthus lawrencei	1,000-2,499	NT	Steady	Preliminary estimate, actual population may be higher.	
Marvelous spatuletail	Loddigesia mirabilis	1,000-2,499	NT	▼		
Esmeraldas woodstar	Chaetocercus berlepschi	1,000-2,700	VU	▼	Total population is estimated to be 1,600-3,900 individuals.	
Tolima blossomcrown	Anthocephala berlepschi	1,000-4,500	VU	▼		
Lyre-tailed hummingbird (Inagua woodstar)	Nesophlox lyrura	1,000-4,999	LC	Steady	Total population is estimated to "number in the low thousands."	
Juan Fernández firecrown	Sephanoides fernandensis	1,500-3,500	CR	▼	Total population is estimated to be 2,298-5,263 individuals.	
Mangrove hummingbird	Chrysuronia boucardi	1,500-7,000	EN	▼	Total population is estimated to be 2,500-9,999 individuals. IUCN/BirdLife International place this species in genus Amazilia.	
Seychelles swiftlet	Aerodramus elaphrus	1,700-2,000	VU	Steady	Total population is estimated to be 2,500-3,000 individuals.	
Glow-throated hummingbird	Selasphorus ardens	2,000-12,000	EN	▼	Estimate assumes 10% of suitable habitat is occupied. True population may be toward lower end of estimate.	
Outcrop sabrewing	Campylopterus calcirupicola	2,400-15,000	VU	▼	Total population is estimated to be 3,600 - 22,000 individuals, assuming 10% occupancy of suitable habitat.	
Ashy-tailed swift	Chaetura andrei	2,500-9,999	VU	▼	Preliminary estimate using known population density of a congeneric species (C. spinicaudus).	
Hook-billed hermit	Glaucis dohrnii	2,500-9,999	VU	▼	Total population is estimated to be 2,800-24,000 individuals, but is expected to be toward the lower arm due to the species' habitat needs.	
Wedge-tailed hillstar	Oreotrochilus adela	2,500-9,999	LC	▼	Total population is estimated to be, at most, 15,200 individuals.	
Scissor-tailed hummingbird	Hylonympha macrocerca	3,000-4,000	EN	▼	Total population is estimated to be 5,000-6,000 individuals.	
Mariana swiftlet	Aerodramus bartschi	3,000-5,000	VU	▼	Total population (excluding introduced population on O'ahu) is 5,200 individuals.	
Royal sunangel	Heliangelus regalis	3,000-8,999	NT	▼	Total population is estimated to be 5,000-12,500 individuals, combining population estimates from Ecuador (2,500) and Peru (2,500-10,000).	
Little woodstar	Chaetocercus bombus	5,000-19,999	NT	▼		
White-bearded helmetcrest	Oxypogon lindenii	5,000-25,000	NT	?		
Mexican sheartail	Doricha eliza	5,600-8,300	NT	▼	Total population is estimated to be 8,500-12,500 individuals.	
Mexican woodnymph	Eupherusa ridgwayi	6,000-15,000	VU	▼	Total population is estimated to be 10,000-19,999 individuals.	
White-tailed hummingbird	Eupherusa poliocerca	6,000-15,000	NT	▼	Total population is estimated to be 10,000-19,999 individuals.	
Black inca	Coeligena prunellei	7,500	VU	▼	Total population is estimated to be 11,250 individuals.	
Philippine spinetail	Mearnsia picina	>10,000	NT	▼	Population of mature individuals is "not thought to number fewer than 10,000."	
Honduran emerald	Amazilia luciae	10,000-19,999	VU	▼		
Mascarene swiftlet	Aerodramus francicus	10,000-19,999	NT	▼	Preliminary estimates based on counts for colonies on Mauritius and the Réunion archipelago.	
Chestnut-bellied hummingbird	Saucerottia castaneiventris	10,000-19,999	NT	▼	A recent study estimated population to be as high as 117,733 mature individuals, so values given may be a large underestimate.	
Koepcke's hermit	Phaethornis koepckeae	13,000-57,000	LC	▼	Total population is estimated to be 20,000-86,000 individuals.	
Perijá metaltail	Metallura iracunda	14,000-37,000	NT	Steady	Total population is estimated to be 21,250-55,250 individuals.	
Plain swift	Apus unicolor	15,000-40,000	LC	?		
White-fronted swift	Cypseloides storeri	20,000-49,999	DD	?	Trend and assessment are unknown due to uncertainties regarding this species' habitat requirements.	
Emerald-chinned hummingbird	Abeillia abeillei	20,000-49,999	LC	▼		
Veraguas mango (Veraguan mango)	Anthracothorax veraguensis	20,000-49,999	LC	Steady		
Green mango	Anthracothorax viridis	20,000-49,999	LC	Steady		
Xantus's hummingbird	Basilinna xantusii	20,000-49,999	LC	Steady		
Beautiful hummingbird (Beautiful sheartail)	Calothorax pulcher	20,000-49,999	LC	▼		
Costa Rican swift	Chaetura fumosa	20,000-49,999	LC	Steady		
Humboldt's hummingbird (Humboldt's sapphire)	Chrysuronia humboldtii	20,000-49,999	LC	▼		
Cozumel emerald	Cynanthus forficatus	20,000-49,999	LC	Steady		
White-chinned swift	Cypseloides cryptus	20,000-49,999	LC	▼		
Slender sheartail	Doricha enicura	20,000-49,999	LC	▼		
White-bellied mountain-gem	Lampornis hemileucus	20,000-49,999	LC	Steady		
Garnet-throated hummingbird	Lamprolaima rhami	20,000-49,999	LC	Steady		
White-crested coquette	Lophornis adorabilis	20,000-49,999	LC	▼		
Black-crested coquette	Lophornis helenae	20,000-49,999	LC	▼		
White-tailed emerald	Microchera chionura	20,000-49,999	LC	▼		
Coppery-headed emerald	Microchera cupreiceps	20,000-49,999	LC	Steady		
Rufous sabrewing	Pampa rufus	20,000-49,999	LC	▼		
Great swallow-tailed swift	Panyptila sanctihieronymi	20,000-49,999	LC	▼		
Mexican hermit	Phaethornis mexicanus	20,000-49,999	LC	▼		
Magenta-throated woodstar	Philodice bryantae	20,000-49,999	LC	▼		
Purple-throated woodstar	Philodice mitchellii	20,000-49,999	LC	▼		
Wine-throated hummingbird	Selasphorus ellioti	20,000-49,999	LC	▼		
Volcano hummingbird	Selasphorus flammula	20,000-49,999	LC	Steady		
Scintillant hummingbird	Selasphorus scintilla	20,000-49,999	LC	▼		
Sparkling-tailed woodstar	Tilmatura dupontii	20,000-49,999	LC	Steady		
Bee hummingbird	Mellisuga helenae	22,000-66,000	NT	▼		
Blue-headed hummingbird	Riccordia bicolor	25,000-150,000	NT	▼		
Dot-eared coquette	Lophornis gouldii	28,000-376,000	NT	▼	Total population is tentatively estimated to be 43,000 - 563,000 individuals, assuming that 5-10% of suitable habitat is occupied.	
Puerto Rican emerald	Riccordia maugaeus	30,000-39,999	LC	Steady		
Hooded visorbearer	Augastes lumachella	35,000-100,000	NT	▼		
White-tailed sabrewing	Campylopterus ensipennis	50,000-99,999	NT	▼		
Spot-fronted swift	Cypseloides cherriei	50,000-99,999	LC	▼	May be an underestimate, given the frequency of observations.	
Violet sabrewing	Campylopterus hemileucurus	50,000-499,999	LC	▼		
Chapman's swift	Chaetura chapmani	50,000-499,999	LC	▼		
Blue-throated goldentail (Blue-throated sapphire)	Chlorestes eliciae	50,000-499,999	LC	▼		
Violet-bellied hummingbird	Chlorestes julie	50,000-499,999	LC	▼		
Garden emerald	Chlorostilbon assimilis	50,000-499,999	LC	Steady		
Sapphire-throated hummingbird	Chrysuronia coeruleogularis	50,000-499,999	LC	Steady		
Golden-crowned emerald	Cynanthus auriceps	50,000-499,999	LC	▼		
Stripe-tailed hummingbird	Eupherusa eximia	50,000-499,999	LC	▼		
Black-bellied hummingbird	Eupherusa nigriventris	50,000-499,999	LC	▼		
White-tipped sicklebill	Eutoxeres aquila	50,000-499,999	LC	▼		
Amethyst-throated mountain-gem	Lampornis amethystinus	50,000-499,999	LC	▼		
Purple-throated mountain-gem	Lampornis calolaemus	50,000-499,999	LC	▼		
Green-throated mountain-gem	Lampornis viridipallens	50,000-499,999	LC	▼		
Rufous-crested coquette	Lophornis delattrei	50,000-499,999	LC	▼		
Snowcap	Microchera albocoronata	50,000-499,999	LC	▼		
Plain-capped starthroat	Heliomaster constantii	50,000-499,999	LC	▼		
Purple-crowned fairy	Heliothryx barroti	50,000-499,999	LC	▼	Values given are for total population.	
Fiery-throated hummingbird	Panterpe insignis	50,000-499,999	LC	Steady		
Scaly-breasted sabrewing (Scaly-breasted hummingbird)	Phaeochroa cuvierii	50,000-499,999	LC	Steady		
Dusky hummingbird	Phaeoptila sordidus	50,000-499,999	LC	Steady		
Stripe-throated hermit	Phaethornis striigularis	50,000-499,999	LC	▼		
White-whiskered hermit	Phaethornis yaruqui	50,000-499,999	LC	▼		
Charming hummingbird	Polyerata decora	50,000-499,999	LC	▼		
Blue-tailed hummingbird	Saucerottia cyanura	50,000-499,999	LC	▼		
Snowy-bellied hummingbird	Saucerottia edward	50,000-499,999	LC	Steady		
Bumblebee hummingbird	Selasphorus heloisa	50,000-499,999	LC	Steady		
White-naped swift	Streptoprocne semicollaris	50,000-499,999	LC	▼		
Tooth-billed hummingbird	Androdon aequatorialis	52,000-87,000	LC	▼	Total population is estimated to be 78,000-130,000 individuals.	
Caroline swiftlet	Aerodramus inquietus	83,500	LC	Steady	Value given is 1999 estimate for total population, excluding population on Yap. Value should therefore be considered an underestimate.	
Black swift (American black swift)	Cypseloides niger	170,000	VU	▼		
Saw-billed hermit	Ramphodon naevius	175,000-1,710,000	LC	▼	Total population is tentatively estimated to be 262,000 - 2,560,000 individuals, assuming 5-25% of suitable habitat is occupied.	
Lucifer hummingbird (Lucifer sheartail)	Calothorax lucifer	200,000	LC	Steady		
Greenish puffleg	Haplophaedia aureliae	336,000-570,000	LC	▼		
Cinnamon hummingbird	Amazilia rutila	500,000-4,999,999	LC	Steady		
Green-breasted mango	Anthracothorax prevostii	500,000-4,999,999	LC	▼		
Band-rumped swift	Chaetura spinicaudus	500,000-4,999,999	LC	▼		
White-vented plumeleteer	Chalybura buffonii	500,000-4,999,999	LC	▼		
Bronze-tailed plumeleteer	Chalybura urochrysia	500,000-4,999,999	LC	▼		
White-bellied emerald	Chlorestes candida	500,000-4,999,999	LC	▼		
Brown violetear	Colibri delphinae	500,000-4,999,999	LC	▼		
Canivet's emerald	Cynanthus canivetii	500,000-4,999,999	LC	Steady		
Green-fronted lancebill	Doryfera ludovicae	500,000-4,999,999	LC	Steady		
Bronzy hermit	Glaucis aeneus	500,000-4,999,999	LC	▼		
Green-crowned brilliant	Heliodoxa jacula	500,000-4,999,999	LC	Steady		
Long-billed starthroat	Heliomaster longirostris	500,000-4,999,999	LC	▼		
Violet-headed hummingbird	Klais guimeti	500,000-4,999,999	LC	▼		
Green hermit	Phaethornis guy	500,000-4,999,999	LC	▼		
Blue-chested hummingbird	Polyerata amabilis	500,000-4,999,999	LC	▼		
Azure-crowned hummingbird	Saucerottia cyanocephala	500,000-4,999,999	LC	▼		
Steely-vented hummingbird	Saucerottia saucerottei	500,000-4,999,999	LC	▼	IOC taxonomy splits an additional species, the blue-vented hummingbird (S. hoffmanni) from this one. IUCN/BirdLife International include both species within S. saucerottei.	
Lesser swallow-tailed swift	Panyptila cayennensis	500,000-4,999,999	LC	▼		
Pale-bellied hermit	Phaethornis anthophilus	500,000-4,999,999	LC	▼		
Chestnut-collared swift	Streptoprocne rutila	500,000-4,999,999	LC	▼		
Band-tailed barbthroat	Threnetes ruckeri	500,000-4,999,999	LC	▼		
Buff-bellied hummingbird	Amazilia yucatanensis	610,000	LC	?		
Pallid swift	Apus pallidus	800,000-1,499,999	LC	Steady	Preliminary estimate extrapolated from European data, which represents 15% of population.	
Vaux's swift	Chaetura vauxi	860,000	LC	▼		
Allen's hummingbird	Selasphorus sasin	1,500,000	LC	▲		
White-eared hummingbird	Basilinna leucotis	2,000,000	LC	▼		
Magnificent hummingbird (Rivoli's hummingbird)	Eugenes fulgens	2,000,000	LC	Steady		
Blue-throated mountain-gem	Lampornis clemenciae	2,000,000	LC	Steady		
Violet-crowned hummingbird	Ramosomyia violiceps	2,000,000	LC	Steady	IUCN/BirdLife International place this species in genus Leucolia.	
Berylline hummingbird	Saucerottia beryllina	2,000,000	LC	Steady		
Alpine swift	Tachymarptis melba	2,160,000-4,870,000	LC	?	Preliminary estimate extrapolated from European data, which represents 30% of population.	
Grey-breasted sabrewing	Campylopterus largipennis	3,000,000-13,000,000	LC	▼	Total population is estimated to be 4,000,000-20,000,000 individuals.	
White-throated swift	Aeronautes saxatalis	3,200,000	LC	▼		
Costa's hummingbird	Calypte costae	3,400,000	LC	▲		
Calliope hummingbird	Selasphorus calliope	4,500,000	LC	▲		
Crowned woodnymph	Thalurania colombica	5,000,000-49,999,999	LC	▼		
Rufous-tailed hummingbird	Amazilia tzacatl	5,000,000-50,000,000	LC	▼		
Black-throated mango	Anthracothorax nigricollis	5,000,000-50,000,000	LC	Steady		
Short-tailed swift	Chaetura brachyura	5,000,000-50,000,000	LC	Steady		
White-necked jacobin	Florisuga mellivora	5,000,000-50,000,000	LC	▼		
Rufous-breasted hermit	Glaucis hirsutus	5,000,000-50,000,000	LC	▼		
White-collared swift	Streptoprocne zonaris	5,000,000-50,000,000	LC	▼		
Chimney swift	Chaetura pelagica	7,700,000	VU	▼	Total population is estimated to be 15,000,000 individuals.	
Black-chinned hummingbird	Archilochus alexandri	8,800,000	LC	▲		
Anna's hummingbird	Calypte anna	9,600,000	LC	▲		
Broad-tailed hummingbird	Selasphorus platycercus	9,800,000	LC	▼		
Rufous hummingbird	Selasphorus rufus	22,000,000	NT	▼		
Ruby-throated hummingbird	Archilochus colubris	36,000,000	LC	▲		
Grey-rumped swift	Chaetura cinereiventris	50,000,000	LC	▼		
Common swift	Apus apus	80,000,000-142,000,000	LC	▼	Preliminary estimate extrapolated from European data, which represents 40% of population.	

== Species without population estimates ==
Common name	Binomial name	Population	Status	Trend	Notes	Image
Venezuelan sylph	Aglaiocercus berlepschi	unknown	EN	▼		
Green violetear (Mexican violetear)	Colibri thalassinus	unknown	LC	▼	IOC taxonomy splits an additional species, the lesser violetear (C. cyanotus) from this species. IUCN/BirdLife International maintain both species within C. thalassinus.	
Rothschild's swift	Cypseloides rothschildi	unknown	LC	▼		
Neblina metaltail	Metallura odomae	unknown	LC	Steady	Species was previously reported to have ~6,700 mature individuals (10,000 total individuals). In the interim, this preliminary estimate has been rescinded.	

== See also ==
- Lists of birds by population
- Lists of organisms by population
