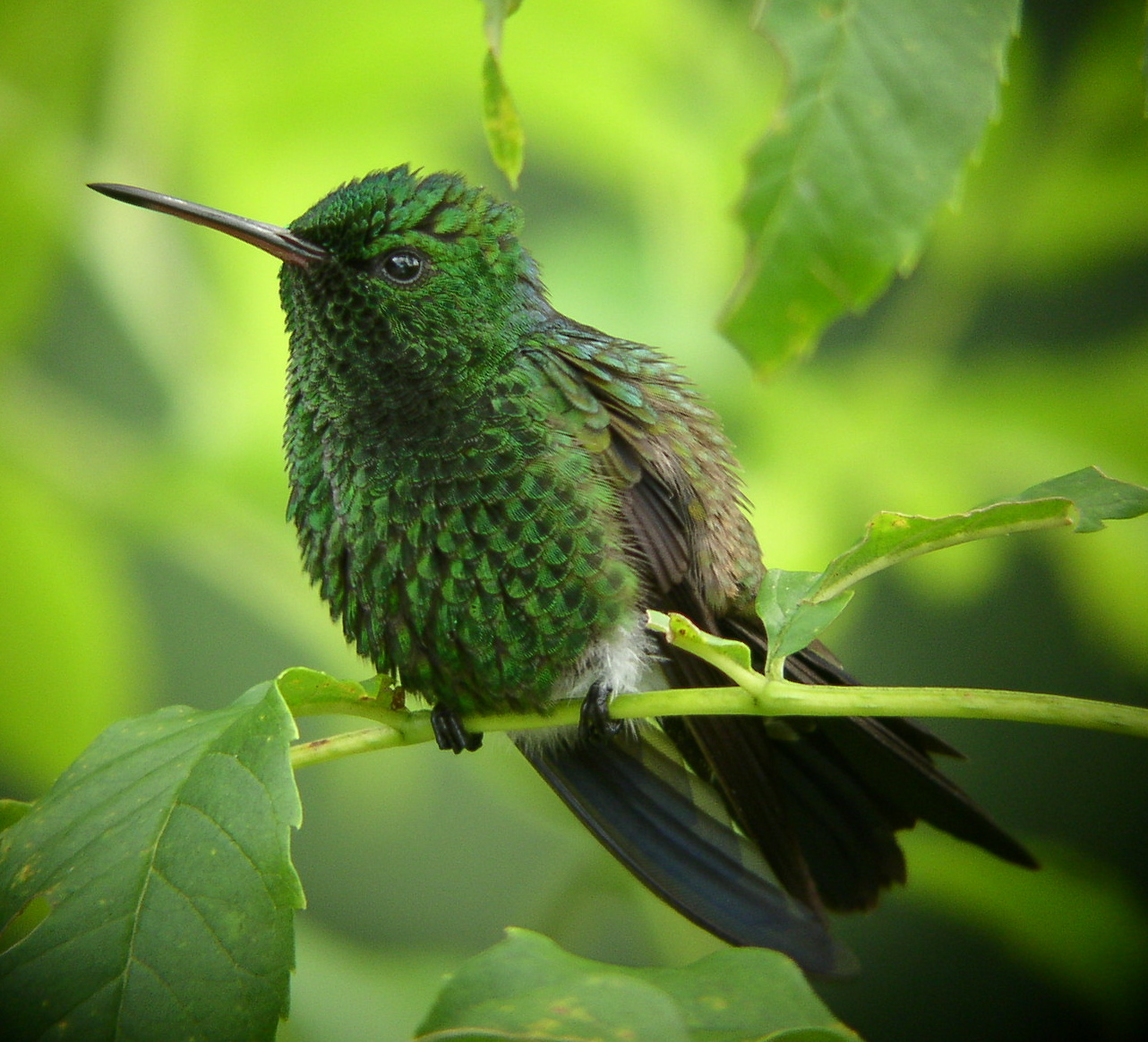
- S. t. erythronota, Trinidad
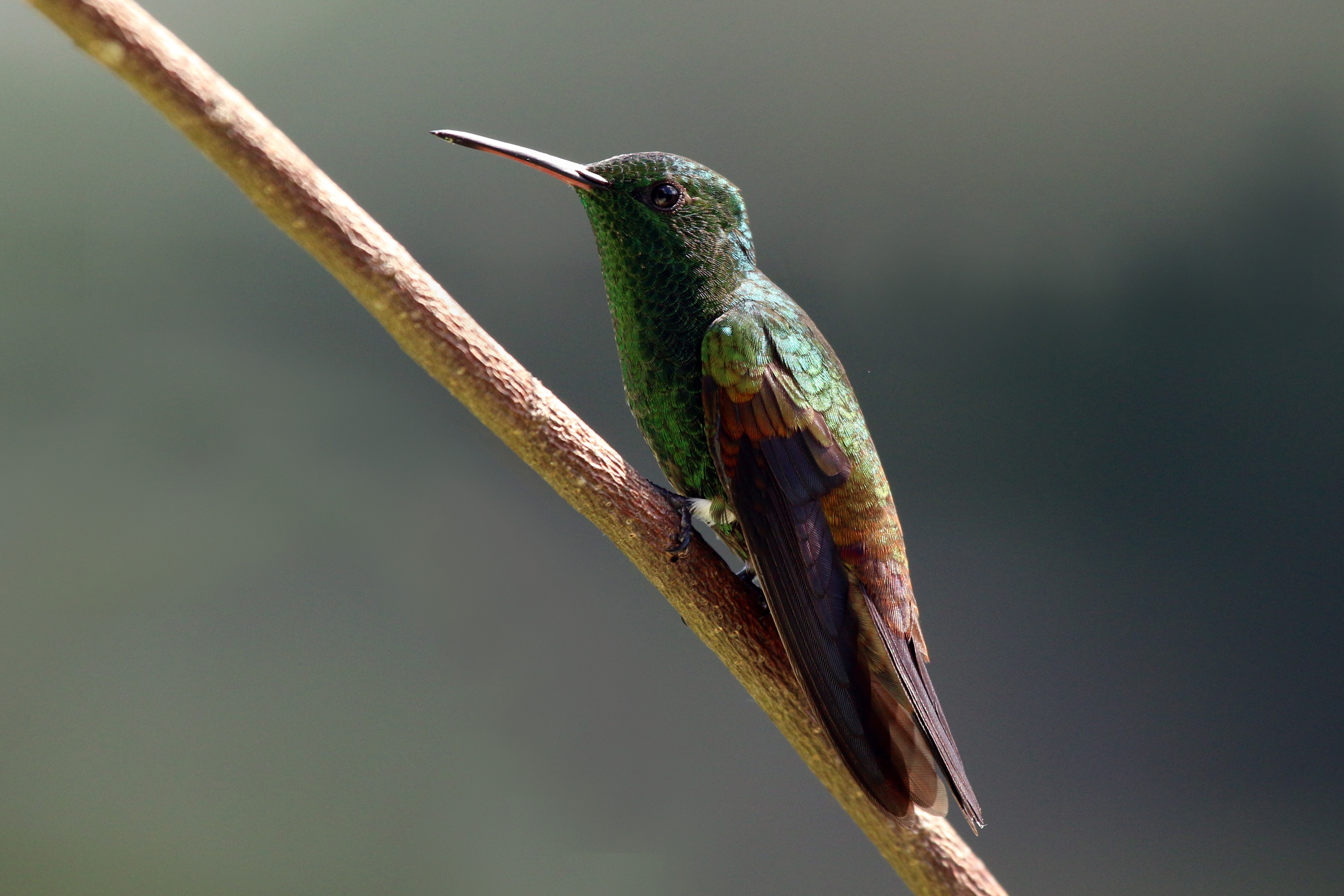
- S. t. tobaci, Tobago

Conservation status
- Least Concern (IUCN 3.1)
- CITES Appendix II

Scientific classification
- Kingdom: Animalia
- Phylum: Chordata
- Class: Aves
- Order: Apodiformes
- Family: Trochilidae
- Genus: Saucerottia
- Species: S. tobaci

Binomial name
- Saucerottia tobaci (Gmelin, 1788)
- Range in green

Synonyms
- Amazilia tobaci

= Copper-rumped hummingbird =

Species of birds

The copper-rumped hummingbird (Saucerottia tobaci) is a species of hummingbird in the "emeralds", tribe Trochilini of subfamily Trochilinae. It is found in Tobago, Trinidad, Venezuela, and possibly Grenada.

== Taxonomy and systematics ==
The copper-rumped hummingbird was formally described in 1788 by the German naturalist Johann Friedrich Gmelin in his revised and expanded edition of Carl Linnaeus's Systema Naturae. He placed it with all the other hummingbirds in the genus Trochilus and coined the binomial name Trochilus tobaci. Gmelin based his description on the "Tobago Humming-Bird" that had been described in 1782 by the English ornithologist John Latham in his A General Synopsis of Birds. The copper-rumped hummingbird was formerly placed in the genus Amazilia. A molecular phylogenetic study published in 2014 found that the genus Amazilia was polyphyletic. In the revised classification to create monophyletic genera, the copper-rumped hummingbird was moved by most taxonomic systems to the resurrected genus Saucerottia. However, BirdLife International's Handbook of the Birds of the World (HBW) retains it in Amazilia.

The genus Saucerottia had been introduced in 1850 by the French naturalist Charles Lucien Bonaparte. The genus name is from the specific epithet saucerrottei for the steely-vented hummingbird, the type species. The epithet was coined in 1846 by Adolphe Delattre and Jules Bourcier to honor the French physician and ornithologist Antoine Constant Saucerotte. The specific epithet tobaci is from the island of Tobago, the type locality.

These seven subspecies of copper-rumped hummingbird are recognised by world-wide taxonomic systems:

- S. t. monticola Todd, 1913
- S. t. feliciae (Lesson, R, 1840)
- S. t. caudata (Zimmer, JT & Phelps, 1949)
- S. t. aliciae (Richmond, 1895)
- S. t. erythronotos (Lesson, R, 1829)
- S. t. tobaci (Gmelin, JF, 1788)
- S. t. caurensis Berlepsch & Hartert, E, 1902

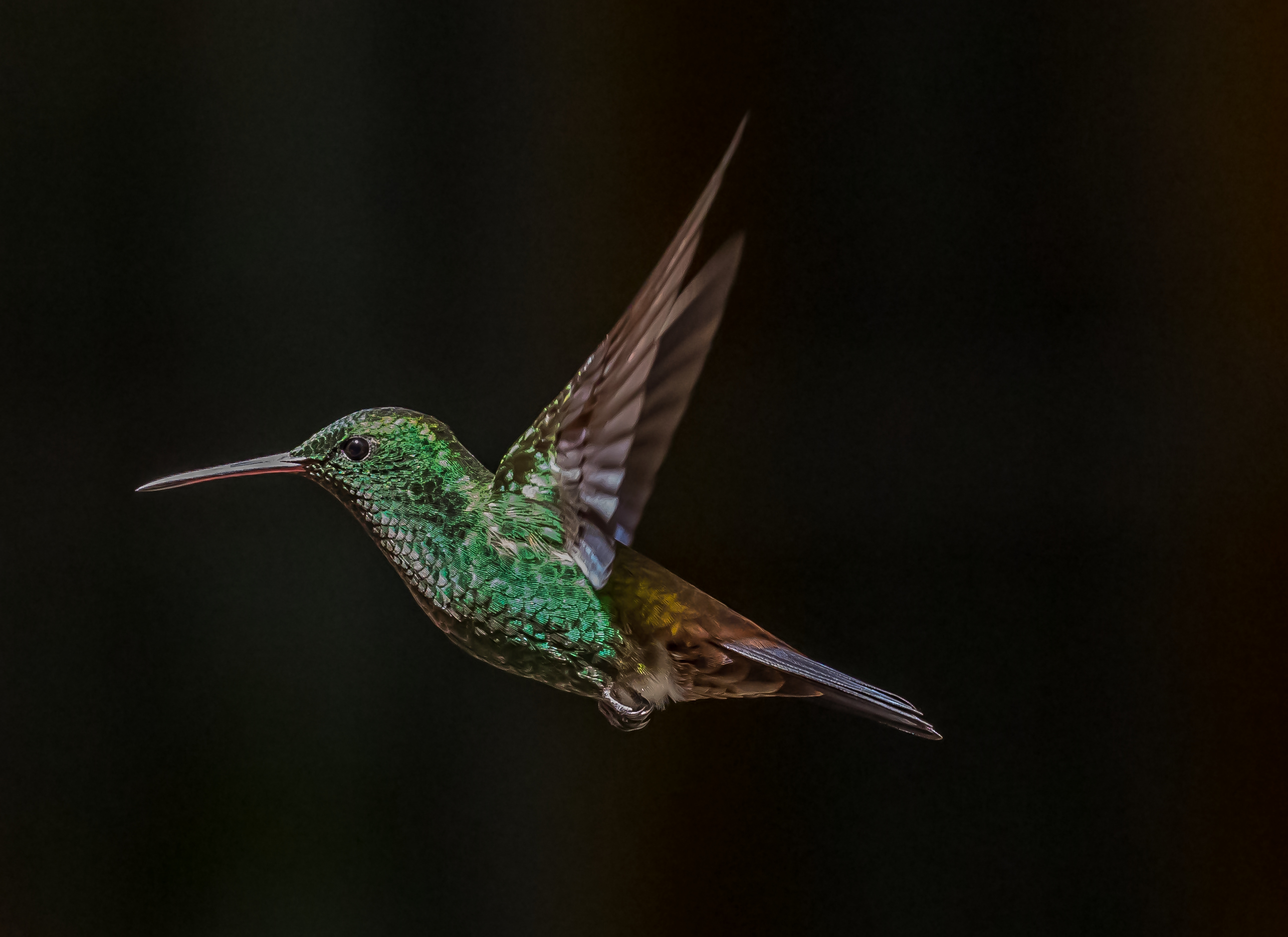
A. t. tobaci in flight, Tobago

== Description ==
The copper-rumped hummingbird is 9 to 11 cm (3.5 to 4.3 in) long. Males weigh 4.6 to 4.7 g (0.16 to 0.17 oz) and females 3.5 to 4.2 g (0.12 to 0.15 oz). The nominate subspecies S. t. tobaci is the largest. Both sexes of all subspecies have a straight, medium length, blackish bill with a pinkish base to the mandible. Males of S. t. tobaci have bronze-green upperparts with purple-red uppertail coverts. They have dark golden-green underparts with reddish brown undertail coverts. Their tail is purplish black. Adult females are similar though their upperparts are a less intense bronze-green and they have some whitish on the chin and upper throat. Juveniles resemble females but have some grayish brown on the throat and belly.

Subspecies S. t. monticola is darker than the nominate and has a steel blue to violet-blue tail. S. t. feliciae's back is more of a golden-green than the nominate's and its tail is bluish black. S. t. caudata has a dark blue tail. S. t. aliciae has some copper in its upperparts, a blue-black tail, and cinnamon-rufous undertail coverts. S. t. erythronotos has slightly darker underparts than the nominate and some dark purplish in the uppertail coverts. S. t. caurensis has a grayer rump and uppertail coverts than the nominate, a dark purplish tail, and bluish black undertail coverts.

== Distribution and habitat ==
The subspecies of copper-rumped hummingbird are found thus:

- S. t. monticola, the northwestern Venezuelan states of Falcón, Lara, and Yaracuy
- S. t. feliciae, north and central Venezuela between Carabobo and Anzoátegui and south to Táchira, Apure, and Guárico
- S. t. caudata, northeastern Venezuela's states of Sucre and Monagas
- S. t. aliciae, Margarita Island off the coast of Venezuela
- S. t. erythronotos, Trinidad
- S. t. tobaci, Tobago
- S. t. caurensis Bolívar and Amazonas states in southeastern Venezuela

Specimens of this species labeled as from Grenada are believed to have been actually collected on Tobago, and "the occurrence of the species in the Lesser Antilles is doubtful."

The copper-rumped hummingbird inhabits a wide variety of forest types including gallery forest, cloudforest, rainforest, and secondary forest. S. t. erythronotos and S. t. tobaci are also found in savanna, plantations, and gardens. Most subspecies range in elevation from sea level to 1,000 m (3,300 ft) though monticola and feliciae can be found as high as 2,000 m (6,600 ft) and aliciae is seldom found at low elevation.

== Behavior ==
=== Movement ===
The island subspecies of copper-rumped hummingbird are sedentary; the mainland ones make some local movements.

=== Feeding ===
The copper-rumped hummingbird forages for nectar from at least 40 species of trees, vines, herbs, and other plants including introduced species. It is extremely territorial and vigorously defends feeding areas from other birds, even larger ones. In addition to nectar it feeds on small insects by hawking from a perch or by gleaning from vegetation.

=== Breeding ===
The copper-rumped hummingbird's breeding season on Trinidad is almost year-round, excluding only September and October; its peak is from January to March. On Tobago it spans at least from November to June. The breeding seasons of mainland subspecies are essentially unknown. The species builds a nest of silky plant down with lichen on the outside. It places it like a saddle in a fork or on a small branch, usually between 1 and 3 m (3 and 10 ft) above the ground but occasionally as high as 6 m (20 ft). Nests have also been found on wires and clotheslines. The female incubates the clutch of two eggs for 16 to 19 days and fledging occurs 19 to 23 days after hatch. Up to three broods may be produced each season.

=== Vocalization ===
The copper-rumped hummingbird's song is "a repeated phrase of three buzzy or squeaky, well-spaced notes 'tee-dee-dew' or 'tee-dzee-djit'." It also makes "high-pitched descending rattles" when foraging.

== Status ==
The IUCN has assessed the copper-rumped hummingbird as being of Least Concern, though its population size and trend are unknown. It has a large range and no immediate threats have been identified. Those on Trinidad and Tobago and the mainland subspecies S. t. feliciae and S. t. caudata are considered common to very common. The other subspecies appear to be more scattered, though this might be due to incomplete data.
