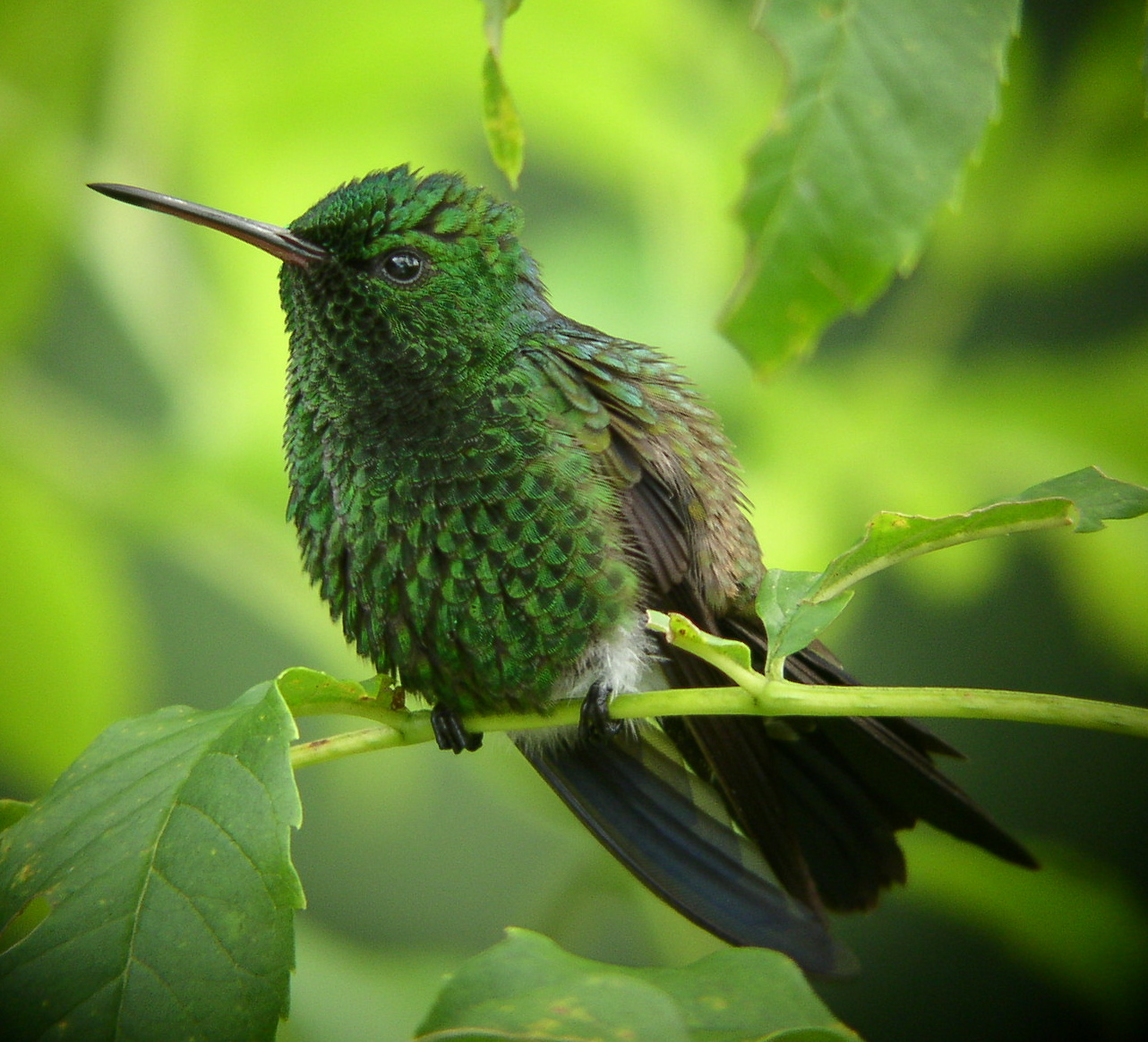
- Copper-rumped hummingbird (Saucerottia tobaci)

Scientific classification
- Kingdom: Animalia
- Phylum: Chordata
- Class: Aves
- Order: Apodiformes
- Family: Trochilidae
- Tribe: Trochilini
- Genus: Saucerottia; Bonaparte, 1850

Type species
- Trochilus saucerrottei (steely-vented hummingbird) Delattre & Bourcier, 1846

Species
- See text

= Saucerottia =

Genus of birds

Saucerottia is a genus of birds in the family Trochilidae, or hummingbirds.

== Species ==
The species now placed in this genus were formerly placed in Amazilia. A molecular phylogenetic study published in 2014 found that the genus Amazilia was polyphyletic. In the revised classification to create monophyletic genera, these species were placed in the resurrected genus Saucerottia. The genus had been introduced in 1850 by the French naturalist Charles Lucien Bonaparte with the steely-vented hummingbird as the type species. The genus name is from the specific epithet saucerrottei for the steely-vented hummingbird. The epithet was coined in 1846 by Adolphe Delattre and Jules Bourcier to honour the French physician and ornithologist Antoine Constant Saucerotte.

The genus contains eleven species:

Genus Saucerottia – Bonaparte, 1850 – eleven species
| Common name | Scientific name and subspecies | Range | Size and ecology | IUCN status and estimated population |
|---|---|---|---|---|
| Azure-crowned hummingbird | Saucerottia cyanocephala (Lesson, 1830) Two subspecies: S. c. cyanocephala (Lesson, 1829); S. c. chlorostephana (Howell, 1965). | Belize, El Salvador, Guatemala, Honduras, Mexico, and Nicaragua. | Size: Habitat: Diet: | LC |
| Blue-vented hummingbird | Saucerottia hoffmanni (Cabanis & Heine,, 1860) | Costa Rica and Nicaragua | Size: Habitat: Diet: | LC |
| Berylline hummingbird | Saucerottia beryllina (Deppe, 1830) Five subspecies: S. b. viola (Miller, W, 1905); S. b. beryllina (Deppe, 1830); S. b. lichtensteini (Moore, RT, 1950); S. b. sumichrasti (Salvin, 1891); S. b. devillei (Bourcier & Mulsant, 1848) | El Salvador, Guatemala, Honduras, Mexico, and the United States. | Size: Habitat: Diet: | LC |
| Blue-tailed hummingbird | Saucerottia cyanura (Gould, 1859) | Costa Rica, El Salvador, Guatemala, Honduras, Mexico, and Nicaragua. | Size: Habitat: Diet: | LC |
| Snowy-bellied hummingbird | Saucerottia edward (Delattre & Bourcier, 1846) Four subspecies: S. e. niveoventer (Gould, 1851); S. e. edward (Delattre & Bourcier, 1846); S. e. collata (Wetmore, 1952); S. e. margaritarum Griscom, 1927 | Costa Rica and Panama with a few records in Colombia. | Size: Habitat: Diet: | LC |
| Steely-vented hummingbird | Saucerottia saucerottei (Delattre & Bourcier, 1846) Three subspecies: S. s. saucerottei; S. s. warscewiczi; S. s. braccata | Colombia and Venezuela | Size: Habitat: Diet: | LC |
| Indigo-capped hummingbird | Saucerottia cyanifrons (Bourcier, 1843) | Colombia | Size: Habitat: Diet: | LC |
| Chestnut-bellied hummingbird Male Female | Saucerottia castaneiventris (Gould, 1856) | Colombia | Size: Habitat: Diet: | NT |
| Green-bellied hummingbird | Saucerottia viridigaster (Bourcier, 1843) | Colombia and Venezuela | Size: Habitat: Diet: | LC |
| Copper-rumped hummingbird | Saucerottia tobaci (Gmelin, 1788) Seven subspecies: S. t. monticola Todd, 1913; S. t. feliciae (Lesson, R, 1840); S. t. caudata (Zimmer, JT & Phelps, 1949); S. t. aliciae (Richmond, 1895); S. t. erythronotos (Lesson, R, 1829); S. t. tobaci (Gmelin, JF, 1788); S. t. caurensis Berlepsch & Hartert, E, 1902 | Tobago, Trinidad, Venezuela, and possibly Grenada. | Size: Habitat: Diet: | LC |
| Copper-tailed hummingbird | Saucerottia cupreicauda (Salvin & Godman, 1884) Four subspecies: S. v. duidae Chapman, 1929; S. v. cupreicauda (Salvin & Godman, 1884); S. v. laireti (Phelps, WH Jr & Aveledo, 1988); S. v. pacaraimae Weller, 2000 | Brazil and Guyana | Size: Habitat: Diet: | LC |
