= Guanacaste hummingbird =

Conservation status
- Critically Endangered (IUCN 3.1)

Scientific classification
- Kingdom: Animalia
- Phylum: Chordata
- Class: Aves
- Clade: Strisores
- Order: Apodiformes
- Family: Trochilidae
- Genus: Saucerottia
- Species: S. alfaroana

Binomial name
- Saucerottia alfaroana (Underwood, 1896)

Synonyms
- Amazilia alfaroana

Species of bird

The Guanacaste hummingbird, also known as the Alfaro's hummingbird or Miravalles hummingbird (Saucerottia alfaroana), is a possibly extinct species of hummingbird known only from a holotype collected in 1895 at the Miravalles Volcano in Costa Rica.

== Taxonomy ==
It is usually treated as a subspecies of the Indigo-capped hummingbird or a hybrid between two unknown hummingbird species, but analysis of the holotype suggests it is its own species.

== Conservation ==
It is possibly extinct, but the ecological stability of the area where the specimen was found indicates a possible undiscovered population still existing. The IUCN classifies it as critically endangered.
