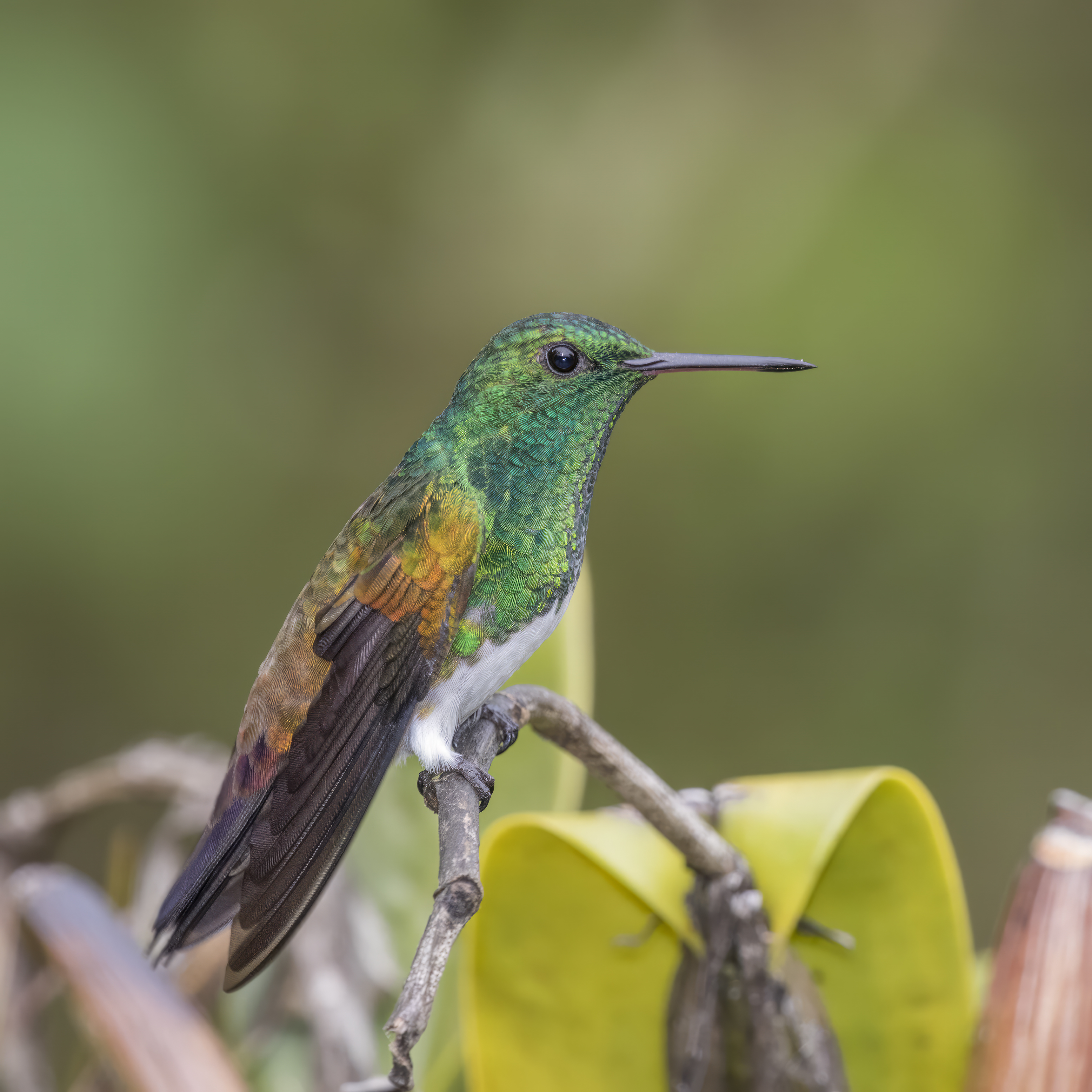

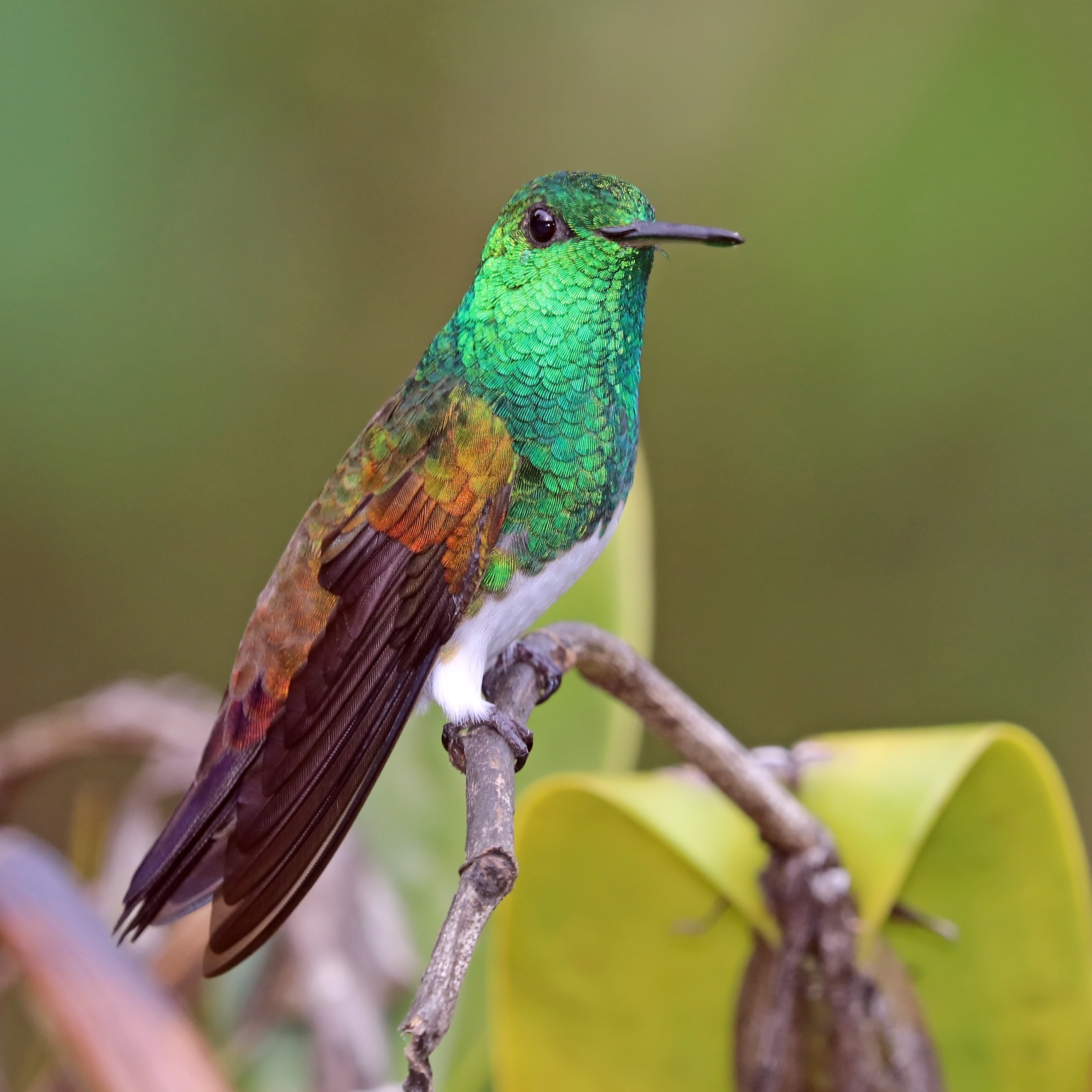
- In Mount Totumas cloud forest, Panama; Images show how 'color' of feathers changes with lighting

Conservation status
- Least Concern (IUCN 3.1)
- CITES Appendix II

Scientific classification
- Kingdom: Animalia
- Phylum: Chordata
- Class: Aves
- Order: Apodiformes
- Family: Trochilidae
- Genus: Saucerottia
- Species: S. edward

Binomial name
- Saucerottia edward (Delattre & Bourcier, 1846)
- Range of S. edward

Synonyms
- Amazilia edward

= Snowy-bellied hummingbird =

Species of bird

The snowy-bellied hummingbird (Saucerottia edward), also known as snowy-breasted hummingbird, is a species of hummingbird in the "emeralds", tribe Trochilini of subfamily Trochilinae. It is found in mostly in Costa Rica and Panama with a few records in Colombia.

== Taxonomy and systematics ==
The snowy-bellied hummingbird was formerly placed in the genus Amazilia. A molecular phylogenetic study published in 2014 found that the genus Amazilia was polyphyletic. In the revised classification to create monophyletic genera, the snowy-bellied hummingbird was moved by most taxonomic systems to the resurrected genus Saucerottia. However, BirdLife International's Handbook of the Birds of the World retains it in Amazilia.

The snowy-bellied hummingbird has these four subspecies:

- S. e. niveoventer (Gould, 1851)
- S. e. edward (Delattre & Bourcier, 1846)
- S. e. collata (Wetmore, 1952)
- S. e. margaritarum Griscom, 1927

Subspecies S. e. niveoventer has been suggested as a separate species based on the color of its tail but this treatment has not gained acceptance.

== Description ==
The snowy-bellied hummingbird is 8 to 11 cm (3.1 to 4.3 in) long. Males weigh 5 to 5.4 g (0.18 to 0.19 oz) and females 4.3 to 5.2 g (0.15 to 0.18 oz). Both sexes of all subspecies have a straight blackish bill whose mandible has a reddish base. Adult males of the nominate subspecies S. e. edward have bronze-green upperparts that are especially coppery in the back and rump. Their tail is bronze to coppery and sometimes has a purple sheen. Their throat and chest are glittering golden green, the belly has a V-shaped white center, and the undertail coverts are rufous. Adult females are similar to males but with a less intense green on their upperparts, a more whitish throat and undertail coverts, and light green tips on the outer tail feathers.

Subspecies S. e. niveoventer is slightly larger than the nominate and its tail is bluish black to purplish black. S. e. collata has less contrast between the green and copper of the back than the nominate and brownish undertail coverts. S. e. margaritarum has paler undertail coverts than the nominate and a bronze to bronze-green tail.

== Distribution and habitat ==
The subspecies of snowy-bellied hummingbird are found thus:

- S. e. niveoventer, from southwestern Costa Rica into western and central Panama including Coiba Island
- S. e. edward, Panama from the Canal Zone east into Darién Province with at least one record in northwestern Colombia's Chocó Department
- S. e. collata, central Panama
- S. e. margaritarum, Panama: southwestern Darién, the Pearl Islands, and other islands in the Gulf of Panama

The snowy-bellied hummingbird inhabits different landscapes across its distribution. In Costa Rica and western Panama it favors semi-open areas such as savanna, scrublands with scattered trees, edges and clearings of primary forest, secondary forest, coffee plantations, and gardens. In elevation it ranges from sea level to 1,600 m (5,200 ft). S. e. collata inhabits fields with low herbs and bushes at elevations between 500 and 850 m (1,600 and 2,800 ft). On islands, S. e. margaritarum inhabits semi-open to open landscapes like abandoned fields and also mangroves; on the mainland it is found in rainforest. In elevation it ranges between sea level and 700 m (2,300 ft).

== Behavior ==
=== Movement ===
The snowy-bellied hummingbird appears to be mostly sedentary. It does make local movements from arid areas in the wet season to more humid ones in the dry season. It also appears to move in response to availability of flowers.

=== Feeding ===
The snowy-bellied hummingbird forages for nectar at a wide variety of native and introduced plants, shrubs, and trees. It usually feeds between about 3 and 6 m (10 and 20 ft) of the ground. It sometimes defends feeding territories. In addition to nectar, it feeds on small arthropods captured by hawking from a perch and by gleaning from foliage.

=== Breeding ===
The western populations of snowy-bellied hummingbird breed between September and January with most nesting in December and January. The nest is a cup of downy fibers with lichens and moss on the outside. It is typically placed on a branch or in a fork of a bush or small tree up to 9 m (30 ft) above the ground. The female incubates the clutch of two eggs; the incubation period and time to fledging are unknown.

=== Vocalization ===
The snowy-bellied hummingbird's song is "a soft 'bebeebee, d’beebee' or 'tseer tir tir'." It also makes "tip" or "tsip" calls.

== Status ==
The IUCN has assessed the snowy-bellied hummingbird as being of Least Concern. It has a large range and a population of at least 50,000 mature individuals that is believed to be stable. No immediate threats have been identified. It is considered locally common to common in most of its range including the islands, though it is uncommon in eastern Panama.

== Additional reading ==
Angehr, George R.; Dean, Robert (2010). The Birds of Panama. Ithaca: Zona Tropical/Comstock/Cornell University Press. p. 150. ISBN 978-0-8014-7674-7.
