= Acrolophus whitelyi =

Scientific classification
- Kingdom: Animalia
- Phylum: Arthropoda
- Clade: Pancrustacea
- Class: Insecta
- Order: Lepidoptera
- Family: Tineidae
- Genus: Acrolophus
- Species: A. whitelyi

Binomial name
- Acrolophus whitelyi (H. H. Druce, 1901)

Synonyms
- Anaphora Whitelyi Druce, 1901

Species of moth

Acrolophus whitelyi is a moth of the subfamily Acrolophinae. It was first described by Hamilton Herbert Druce in 1901. It is found in Guyana. It is named after Henry Whitely who collected the holotype.

== Description ==
The wingspan is 25 mm (1 in). The head, thorax and abdomen are pale brown and the antennae and palpi are yellowish brown. The forewings are yellowish brown, with a large, central, V-shaped, reddish-brown mark extending across the middle of the wing from the costal to the inner margin. The costal margin and the outer margin are striated with reddish brown and there is a reddish-brown dot on the inner margin close to the base. The hindwings are blackish brown.
