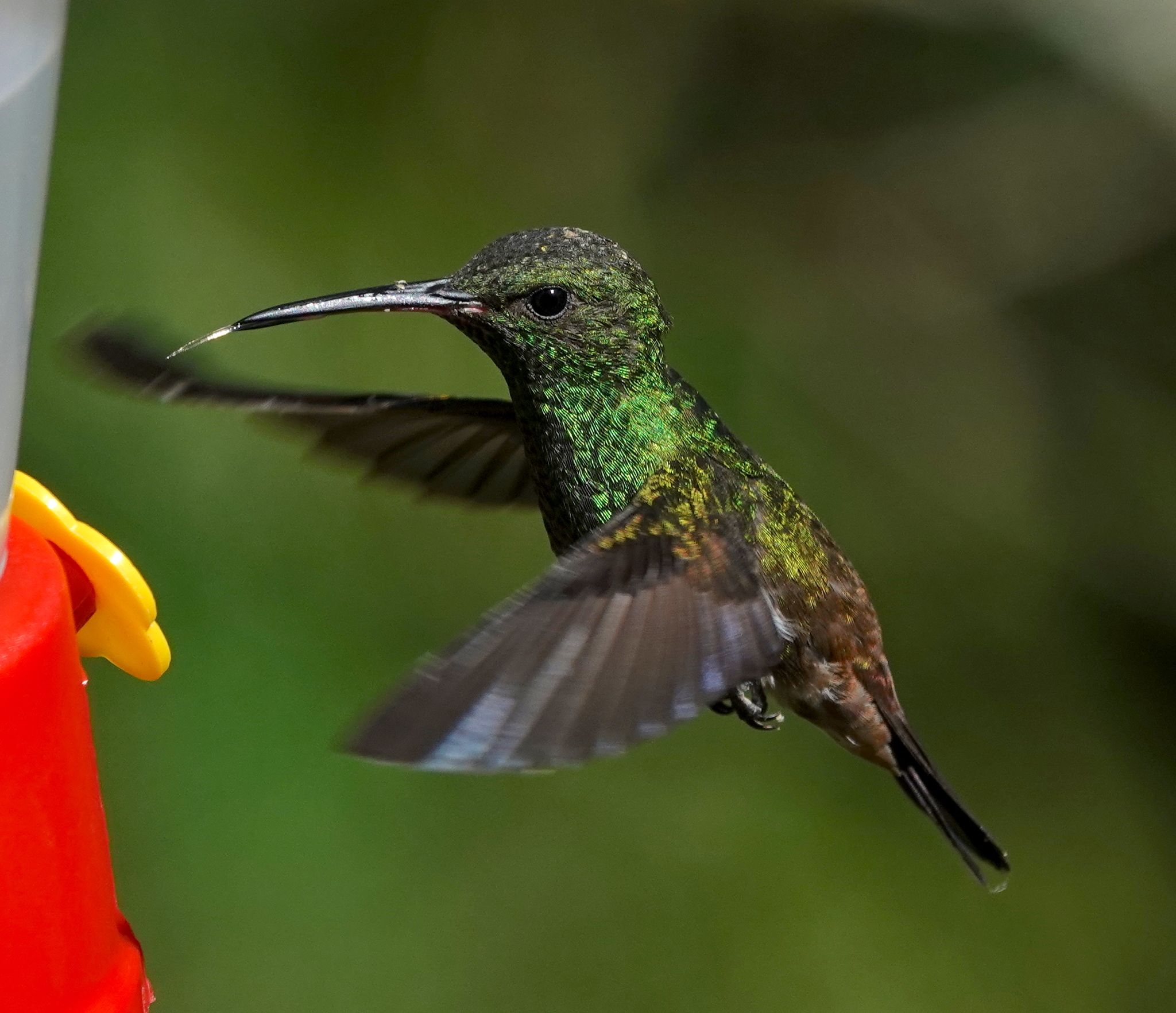

Conservation status
- Least Concern (IUCN 3.1)

Scientific classification
- Kingdom: Animalia
- Phylum: Chordata
- Class: Aves
- Order: Apodiformes
- Family: Trochilidae
- Genus: Saucerottia
- Species: S. viridigaster

Binomial name
- Saucerottia viridigaster (Bourcier, 1843)
- Ranges of S. viridigaster (west) and S. cupreicauda (east)

Synonyms
- Amazilia viridigaster

= Green-bellied hummingbird =

Species of bird

The green-bellied hummingbird (Saucerottia viridigaster) is a species of hummingbird in the "emeralds" tribe Trochilini of subfamily Trochilinae. It is found in Colombia and Venezuela.

== Taxonomy and systematics ==
The green-bellied hummingbird was formerly placed in the genus Amazilia. A molecular phylogenetic study published in 2014 found that the genus Amazilia was polyphyletic. In the revised classification to create monophyletic genera, the green-bellied hummingbird was moved by most taxonomic systems to the resurrected genus Saucerottia.

The green-bellied hummingbird previously was assigned six subspecies. By early 2023 most taxonomic systems had created the copper-tailed hummingbird (S. cupreicauda) containing four of them. They retain the other two subspecies in the green-bellied, the nominate S. v. viridigaster (Bourcier, 1843) and S. v. iodura (Reichenbach, 1854). However, the South American Classification Committee of the American Ornithological Society does not recognize the copper-tailed hummingbird as a separate species.

== Description ==
The green-bellied hummingbird is 8 to 10.5 cm (3.1 to 4.1 in) long and weighs 4.5 to 6.7 g (0.16 to 0.24 oz). Both sexes of both subspecies have a straight, medium length, blackish bill with a pink to reddish base to the mandible. Adult males of the nominate subspecies have a dull golden-green head and back and olive green to brownish rump and uppertail coverts; the last sometimes have a purplish tinge. Their wings are dark purple brown and their tail deep blue to violet blue. Their underparts are a dark shining green becoming grayish brown at the vent. Their undertail coverts are grayish buff with paler edges. Adult females are similar to males with the addition of white fringes on the throat feathers and bronze or brownish edges to the tail feathers. Juveniles resemble females but have grayish brown or brownish gray underparts. Subspecies S. v. iodura has a coppery to purple tail and is otherwise like the nominate.

== Distribution and habitat ==
Subspecies S. v. viridigaster of the green-bellied hummingbird is found in north-central Colombia on the east slope of the Eastern Andes. S. v. iodura is found in the Andes of western Venezuela. The species inhabits a variety of semi-open to open subtropical landscapes including the edges of gallery forest, plantations, scrub- and brushlands, river islands, and low secondary forest. It mostly occurs on the lower to middle slopes of the Andes at elevations between 400 and 1,700 m (1,300 and 5,600 ft).

== Behavior ==
=== Movement ===
The green-bellied hummingbird is sedentary but makes local movements to follow the availability of nectar sources.

=== Feeding ===
The green-bellied hummingbird's foraging strategy and details of its diet are not well documented. It is known to take nectar from the flowers of Quararibea, Inga, and Erythrina and has been photographed feeding at many other plants. It has been observed in large groups at flowering trees. In addition to necatar it feeds on small arthropods.

=== Breeding ===
The green-bellied hummingbird's breeding season appears to span at least from October to January. The one known nest was a cup made of buffy seed down with bits of lichen on the outside and sited on a horizontal tree branch. Nothing else is known about the species' breeding biology.

=== Vocalization ===
The green-bellied hummingbird's song has been variously described as " a short dainty phrase which is repeated several times...tee-tee-dji-dji or tee-dji-tee-dji" and also as "a waif-like ta-da titi-da". Calls include a "short high-pitched buzzy note...tzree..tzree..tzree..." and a "fast stuttered descending series...TSEe-tsee-tsi-tsi-ti-ti".

== Status ==
The IUCN has assessed the green-bellied hummingbird as being of Least Concern, though its population size is not known and is believed to be decreasing due to habitat destruction. No specific threats have been identified. The species is considered uncommon to fairly common in Colombia but its abundance in Venezuela is not known. "It is also frequently seen along forest edges and in areas of anthropogenic disturbance, and is thus may not be as severely impacted by human habitat alteration as some species."
