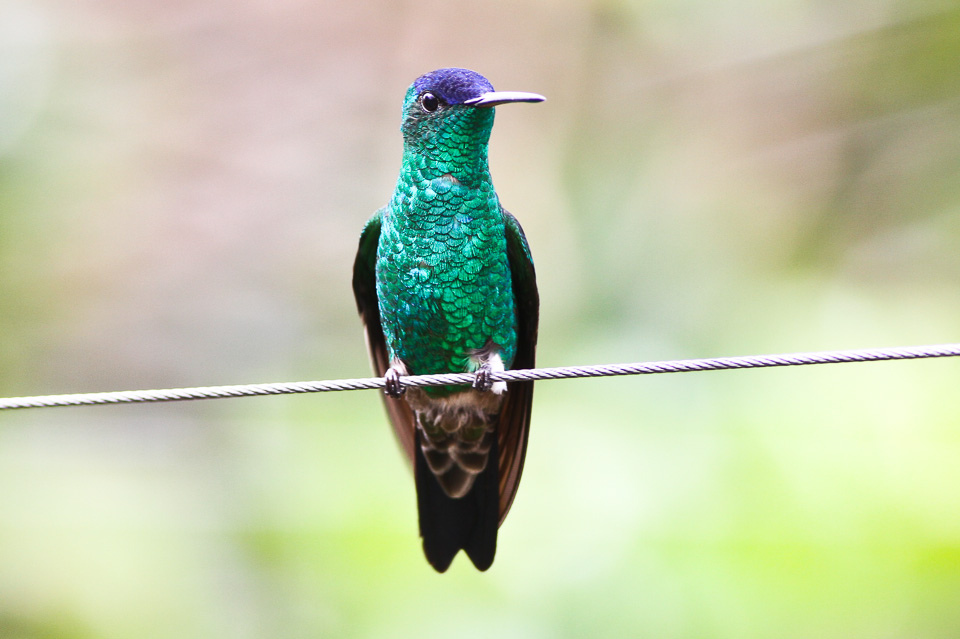

Conservation status
- Least Concern (IUCN 3.1)
- CITES Appendix II (CITES)

Scientific classification
- Kingdom: Animalia
- Phylum: Chordata
- Class: Aves
- Clade: Strisores
- Order: Apodiformes
- Family: Trochilidae
- Genus: Saucerottia
- Species: S. cyanifrons

Binomial name
- Saucerottia cyanifrons (Bourcier, 1843)

Synonyms
- Amazilia cyanifrons

= Indigo-capped hummingbird =

The indigo-capped hummingbird (Saucerottia cyanifrons) is a species of hummingbird in the "emeralds", tribe Trochilini of subfamily Trochilinae. It is endemic to Colombia.

== Taxonomy and systematics ==
The indigo-capped hummingbird was formerly placed in the genus Amazilia. A molecular phylogenetic study published in 2014 found that the genus Amazilia was polyphyletic. In the revised classification to create monophyletic genera, the indigo-capped hummingbird was moved to the resurrected genus Saucerottia. However, BirdLife International's Handbook of the Birds of the World (HBW) retains it in Amazilia.

The indigo-capped hummingbird is monotypic.

== Description ==
The indigo-capped hummingbird is 7 to 10 cm (2.8 to 3.9 in) long and weighs about 5 g (0.18 oz). Both sexes have a black bill with a red base to the mandible. The adult male has an indigo-blue crown, shining green upperparts with a bronze to coppery gloss on the rump, and bronze to bluish black uppertail coverts. Its tail is deep steel blue. Its underparts are glittering golden green with undertail coverts that vary from bronze-green to dark bluish with whitish edges. The adult female's crown is turquoise-blue towards the rear and its throat feathers have a grayish bar near the end. Juveniles are like the female with a grayer belly.

== Distribution and habitat ==
The indigo-capped hummingbird is found in north and central Colombia, principally in Norte de Santander Department, the Magdalena River valley, and the upper Cauca River valley. It inhabits semi-open to open landscapes such as the edges of wet forest, savanna, shrubby areas, plantations, and gardens; most of these are fairly dry. It is most common between 1,000 and 2,000 m (3,300 and 6,600 ft) but regularly occurs down to 400 m (1,300 ft) in the breeding season and sometimes to near sea level. It also rarely occurs as high as 3,000 m (9,800 ft).

== Behavior ==
=== Movement ===
The indigo-capped hummingbird apparently makes seasonal elevational movements in response to availability of flowering plants.

=== Feeding ===
The indigo-capped hummingbird forages for nectar and small arthropods at all heights of its habitat, but mostly in the uppermost stratum. Though it sometimes gathers with other indigo-capped hummingbirds at flowering trees, it is usually territorial and defends feeding patches from hummingbirds and other nectarivorous birds like bananaquits (Coereba flaveola). It usually captures arthropods by hawking from a perch in the canopy but does so occasionally by gleaning from foliage.

=== Breeding ===
The indigo-capped hummingbird's breeding season apparently extends from April to at least July. The nest is a cup of moss, cobweb, and lichen. The clutch size is two eggs but nothing else is known about the species' breeding phenology.

=== Vocalization ===
The indigo-capped hummingbird's song is "a repeated buzzy, squeaky phrase 'tzuk-keee ... tsrp'." It also makes "a high, sharp 'tsit'" call, sometimes in a series.

== Status ==
The IUCN has assessed the indigo-capped hummingbird as being of Least Concern. It has a fairly large range and though its population size is not known it is believed to be stable. No immediate threats have been identified. Its "wide altitudinal range, combined with apparent adaptability to man-made habitats, suggests [the] species is relatively secure at present."
