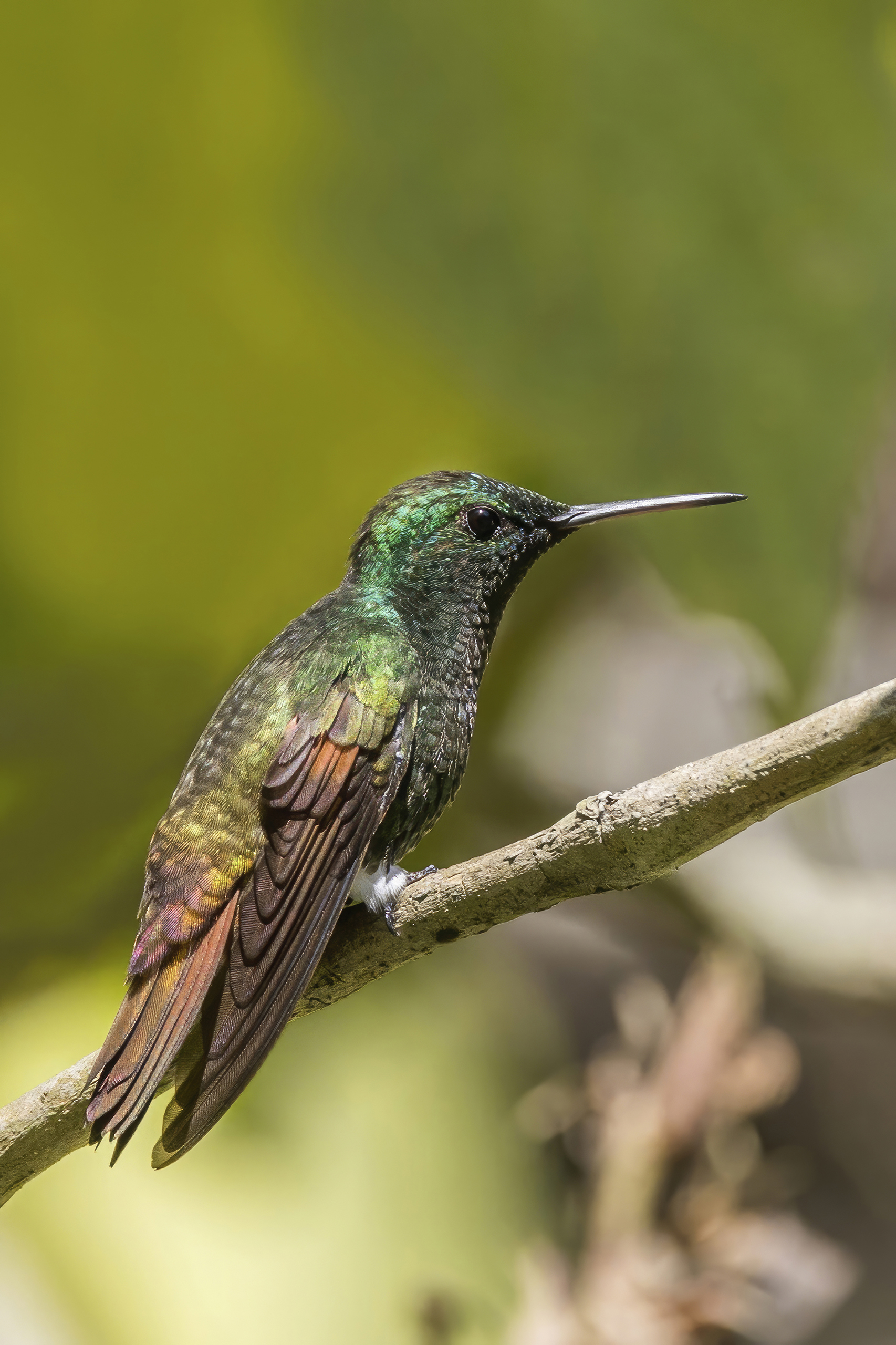
- In Guatemala

Conservation status
- Least Concern (IUCN 3.1)
- CITES Appendix II

Scientific classification
- Kingdom: Animalia
- Phylum: Chordata
- Class: Aves
- Order: Apodiformes
- Family: Trochilidae
- Genus: Saucerottia
- Species: S. beryllina

Binomial name
- Saucerottia beryllina (Deppe, 1830)

Synonyms
- Amazilia beryllina

= Berylline hummingbird =

Species of bird

The berylline hummingbird (Saucerottia beryllina) is a species of hummingbird in the "emeralds", tribe Trochilini of subfamily Trochilinae. It is found in El Salvador, Guatemala, Honduras, Mexico, and the southern United States.

== Taxonomy and systematics ==
The berylline hummingbird was formerly placed in the genus Amazilia. A molecular phylogenetic study published in 2014 found that the genus Amazilia was polyphyletic. In the revised classification to create monophyletic genera, the berylline hummingbird was moved by most taxonomic systems to the resurrected genus Saucerottia. However, BirdLife International's Handbook of the Birds of the World retains it in Amazilia.

=== Subspecies ===
The berylline hummingbird has five subspecies:

Subspecies	Distribution	Traits
S. b. beryllina (Deppe, 1830)	Central Mexico from México state south into Veracruz and Oaxaca	Nominate subspecies
S. b. devillei (Bourcier & Mulsant, 1848)	Discontinuously from other subspecies in southern Guatemala and through El Salvador into central Honduras.	More bronze on back and rump than the nominate, purplish to bronzy chestnut tail
S. b. lichtensteini (Moore, RT, 1950)	Western Chiapas in southern Mexico	Lighter green than the nominate, silvery tail
S. b. sumichrasti (Salvin, 1891)	Extreme southeastern Oaxaca and northern and central Chiapas in southern Mexico	Males have duller green plumage than the nominate, tail has purplish gloss, females' central tail feathers have a silvery to purple cast
S. b. viola (Miller, W, 1905)	Western Mexico from Sonora to Michoacán and Guerrero and rarely to the southwestern US	Grayish tinge on back and rump, fawn to cinnamon belly, dark violet uppertail coverts and tail

== Habitat ==
The berylline hummingbird primarily inhabits arid landscapes. The wide variety includes dense oak and pine-oak forest, scrublands, deciduous and thorn forest, gallery forest, plantations, and parks and gardens. In elevation it is found from near sea level to the submontane zone, though it is most common between 500 and 1,800 m (1,600 and 5,900 ft).

== Description ==
The berylline hummingbird is 8 to 10 cm (3.1 to 3.9 in) long. Males weigh about 4.4 g (0.16 oz) and females about 4.0 g (0.14 oz). The bills of males of all subspecies have a black maxilla and a pinkish mandible with a black outer half. Adult males of the nominate subspecies S. b. beryllina have a bronze-green to coppery head, back and rump. Their uppertail coverts and tail are coppery to rufous. The bases of their primaries and secondaries are chestnut and show as a patch on the closed wing. Their underparts are glittering golden green. Adult nominate females are very similar to males, but with a paler and more grayish throat and belly. Their bills are entirely black. Juveniles are similar to females but with a grayish cinnamon belly.

== Behavior ==
=== Migration ===
The berylline hummingbird has movements that vary with geography. It is sedentary in most of its range except the far north, where it migrates southward for winter. It increasingly has wandered and sometimes bred in southeastern Arizona and has occurred in southwestern New Mexico and western Texas. Even in the bulk of its range it appears to make some seasonal elevational changes.

=== Feeding ===
The berylline hummingbird is a generalist, foraging for nectar at a wide variety of flowering plants both native and introduced. It feeds at all levels of the forest. Though it will congregate with other hummingbird species at flowering trees, it tends to be dominant over most and often defends feeding territories. In addition to nectar it feeds on arthropods captured by hawking from a perch or picking from spider webs.

=== Reproduction ===
In Oaxaca the berylline hummingbird breeds between June and October with a peak in September; its breeding season in the rest of its range has not been defined. It makes a solid cup nest of grass and other plant fibers bound with spiderweb with lichens on the outside. It typically places it on a horizontal branch up to 15 m (50 ft) above the ground. The female incubates the clutch of two eggs; the incubation period has not been determined. Fledging occurs about 20 days after hatch.

=== Vocalization ===
The berylline hummingbird's song is somewhat variable, "slightly gruff, high-pitched twittering notes [with] lisping introductory notes...rendered 'ssi kirr-i-rr kirr-i-rr', 'sirrr, ki-ti ki-dik' or 'sssi-ir sssiir chit-chit chit-chit-chit...'." It also makes calls that are described as "a hard, buzzy 'dzzzzir' or 'drrzzzt', and a more liquid 'dzzzzrrt' that may be repeated several times".

== Conservation status ==
The IUCN has assessed the berylline hummingbird as being of Least Concern. It has a large range and a stable population of about two million mature individuals. No immediate threats have been identified. It varies from uncommon to common in Mexico and south but is very local and rare in the US.
