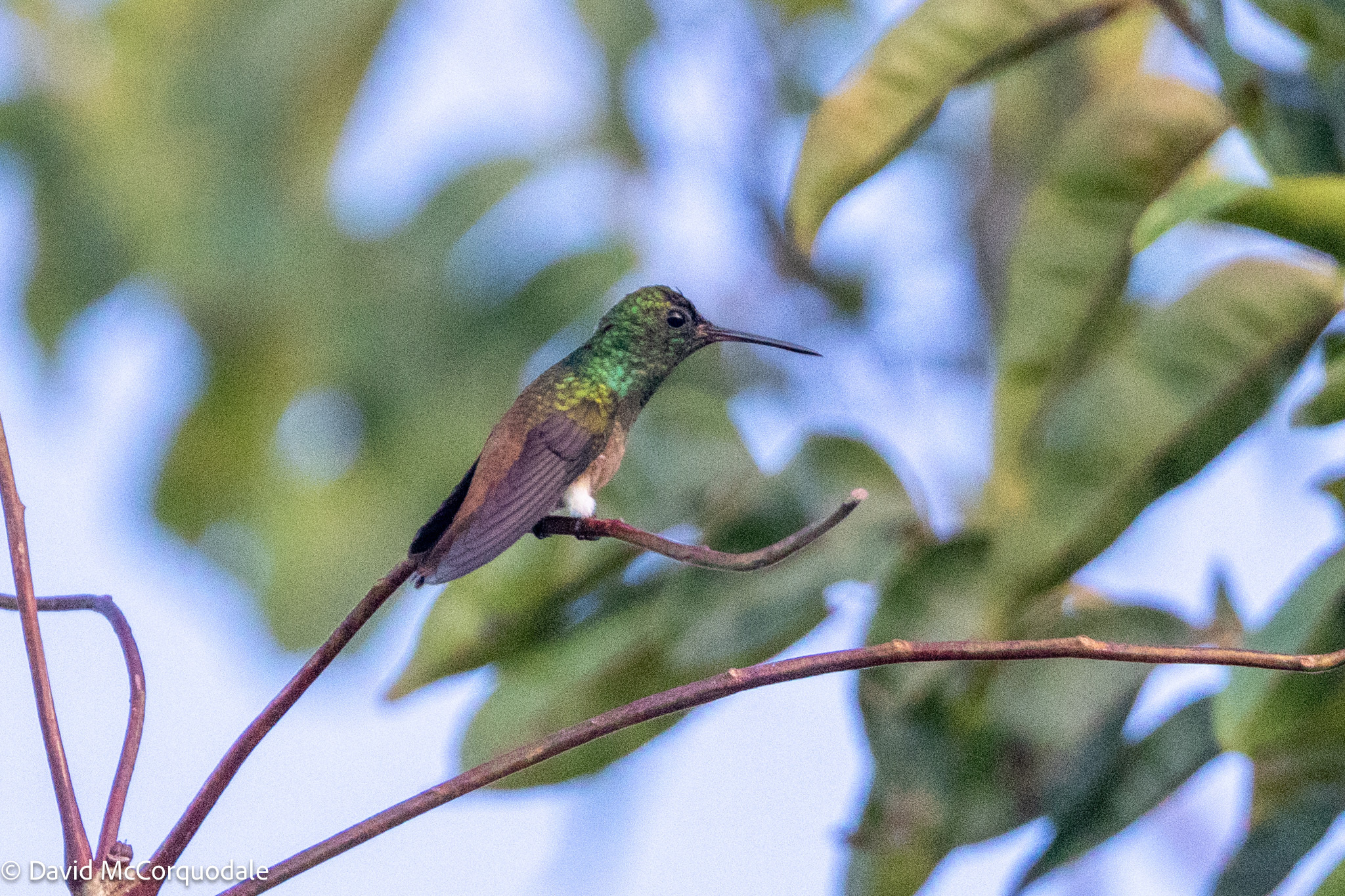

Conservation status
- Least Concern (IUCN 3.1)
- CITES Appendix II

Scientific classification
- Kingdom: Animalia
- Phylum: Chordata
- Class: Aves
- Order: Apodiformes
- Family: Trochilidae
- Genus: Saucerottia
- Species: S. cupreicauda

Binomial name
- Saucerottia cupreicauda (Salvin & Godman, 1884)

= Copper-tailed hummingbird =

Species of bird

The copper-tailed hummingbird (Saucerottia cupreicauda) is a species of hummingbird in the "emeralds", tribe Trochilini of subfamily Trochilinae. It is native to the tepuis of Venezuela and nearby areas of Brazil and Guyana; it is a vagrant in French Guiana.

== Taxonomy and systematics ==
The copper-tailed hummingbird was formally described in 1884 by the English naturalists Osbert Salvin and Frederick DuCane Godman based on specimens collected by Henry Whitely near Mount Roraima in Guyana. Salvin and Godman placed the new species in the genus Amazilia and coined the binomial name Amazilia cupreicauda. The specific epithet combines the Latin cupreus meaning "coppery" with cauda meaning "tail".

A molecular phylogenetic study published in 2014 found that the genus Amazilia was polyphyletic. In the revised classification to create monophyletic genera, the copper-tailed hummingbird was moved by most taxonomic systems to the resurrected genus Saucerottia.

The copper-tailed hummingbird's four subspecies were previously considered subspecies of the green-bellied hummingbird (S. viridigaster). By early 2023 most taxonomic systems had created the copper-tailed hummingbird (S. cupreicauda) containing four of them. However, the South American Classification Committee of the American Ornithological Society does not recognize the copper-tailed hummingbird as a separate species.

The four subspecies are:

- Saucerottia cupreicauda cupreicauda (Salvin & Godman, 1884)
- Saucerottia cupreicauda duidae Chapman, 1929
- Saucerottia cupreicauda laireti (Phelps, WH Jr & Aveledo, 1988)
- Saucerottia cupreicauda pacaraimae Weller, 2000

== Description ==
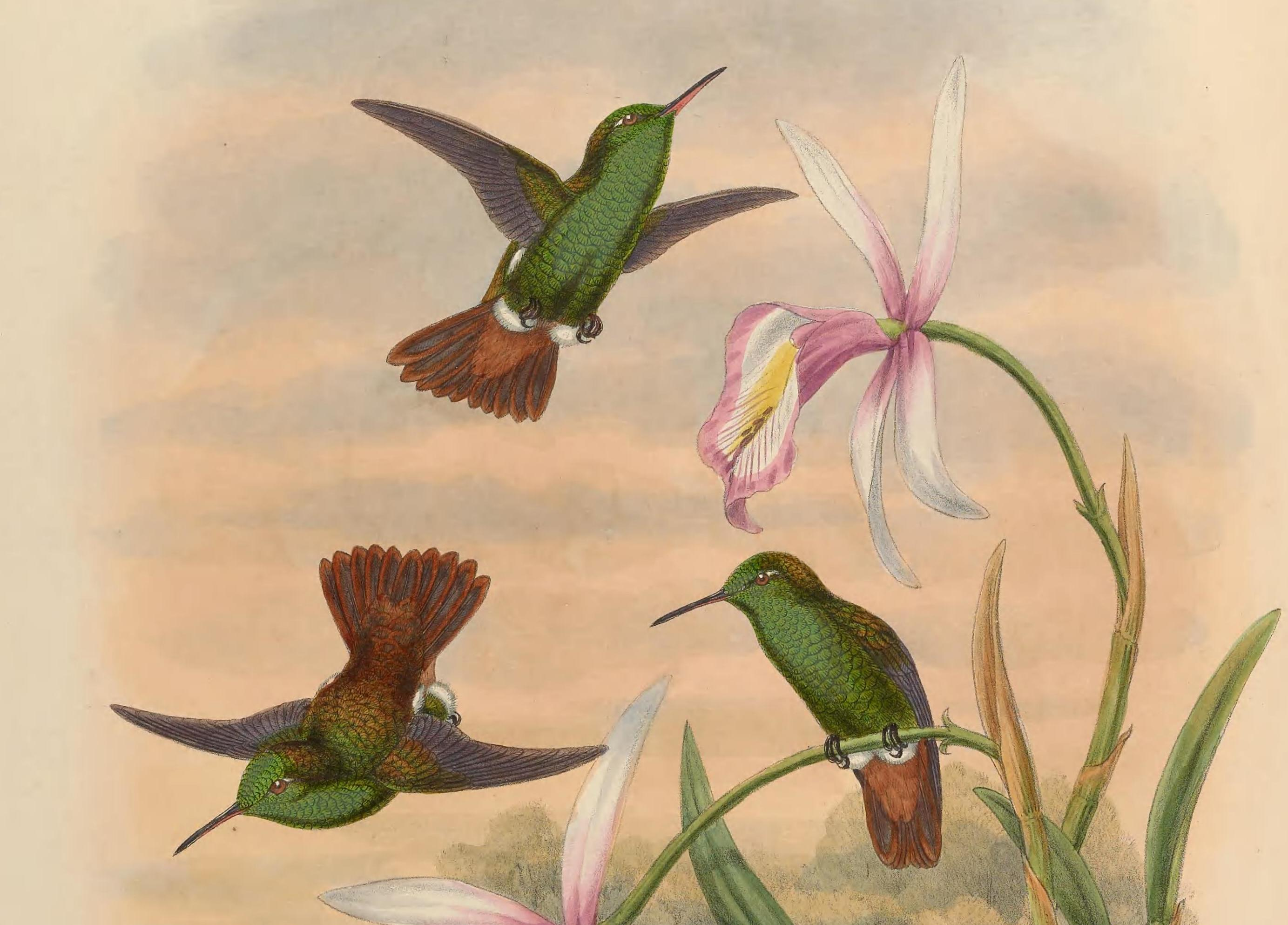
Illustration from John Gould's A monograph of the Trochilidae, or family of humming-birds (1880)

The copper-tailed hummingbird is 8 to 10.5 cm (3.1 to 4.1 in) long and weighs 3.1 to 5 g (0.11 to 0.18 oz). Both sexes of all subspecies have a straight, medium length, blackish bill with a pink to reddish base to the mandible. Males of the nominate subspecies S. c. cupreicauda have crown, nape, and upper back of golden-green to bronze-green that goes through coppery green to the dark cinnamon rump and uppertail coverts. The inner four pairs of tail feathers are dark cinnamon with dark iridescent bronze-purple tips and the outermost pair cinnamon with reddish bronze to rufous tips. their forehead, face, chin, throat, and breast are emerald green, their lower belly and vent grayish brown, and their undertail coverts pale cinnamon. Nominate females are like the male with the addition of white bases to the chin feathers and bronze rather than rufous tips to the outermost tail feathers.

Subspecies S. c. duidae's lower back and rump are more coppery than the nominate's and its tail is rich bronze, with no rufous or cinnamon. Subspecies S. c. laireti is similar to the nominate but is slightly darker green. Its uppertail coverts and tail are golden-bronze to copper. Subspecies S. c. pacaraimae is also darker than the nominate and its back has a stronger copper wash. Its rump and uppertail coverts have a purple sheen, and like laireti no rufous or cinnamon on the tail.

== Distribution and habitat ==
The subspecies of copper-tailed hummingbird are found thus:

- Saucerottia cupreicauda cupreicauda, tepuis where southeastern Venezuela, western Guyana, and extreme northern Brazil meet
- Saucerottia cupreicauda duidae, Cerro Duida in southern Venezuela
- Saucerottia cupreicauda laireti, tepuis of Sierra de Unturán and Cerro de la Neblina in southern Venezuela
- Saucerottia cupreicauda pacaraimae, Sierra de Pacaraima in southern Venezuela

The South American Classification Committee of the American Ornithological Society includes Suriname in the range of S. c. cupreicauda and also notes its occurrence as a vagrant in French Guiana.

The copper-tailed hummingbird inhabits a variety of semi-open to open subtropical landscapes including the edges of gallery forest, plantations, scrub- and brushlands, river islands, and low secondary forest. It mostly occurs on the lower to middle slopes of the tepuis at elevations between 400 and 1,700 m (1,300 and 5,600 ft). S. c. cupreicauda has been found as low as 60 m (200 ft) and S. c. duidae as low as 180 m (590 ft).

== Behavior ==
=== Movement ===
The copper-tailed hummingbird is basically sedentary, but the nominate subspecies is known to make erratic seasonal movements.

=== Feeding ===
The copper-tailied hummingbird's foraging strategy and details of its diet are not well documented. Though its nectar sources have not been studied, it has been photographed feeding at plants of many different families. In addition to necatar it feeds on small arthropods.

=== Breeding ===
The copper-tailed hummingbird's breeding season appaears to include at least January to May. The only fully described nest is of S. c. cupreicauda. It was an open cup made of seed down with moss and lichen on the outside, on thin twigs of a small tree 3 m (10 ft) above the ground. The clutch size, incubation period, and time to fledging are not known.

=== Vocalization ===
The copper-tailed hummingbird's song has been variously described as " a short dainty phrase which is repeated several times...tee-djee-tee-djee or tee-tee-djee-ti". Calls include a "short buzzy note...tzit..tzit..tzit..." and a "stuttered series of a few short high-pitched notes tsi-tsi-tsi-tsi" on the same pitch.

== Status ==
The IUCN has assessed the copper-tailed hummingbird as being of Least Concern, though its population size is not known and is believed to be decreasing due to habitat destruction. No specific threats have been identified. It is "generally described as fairly common to uncommon, but most populations are fairly isolated." Most of the subspecies occur in at least one protected area. "Although no specific data have been published on the effects of anthropogenic habitat modification, the Copper-tailed Hummingbird appears to persist in fairly disturbed areas."
