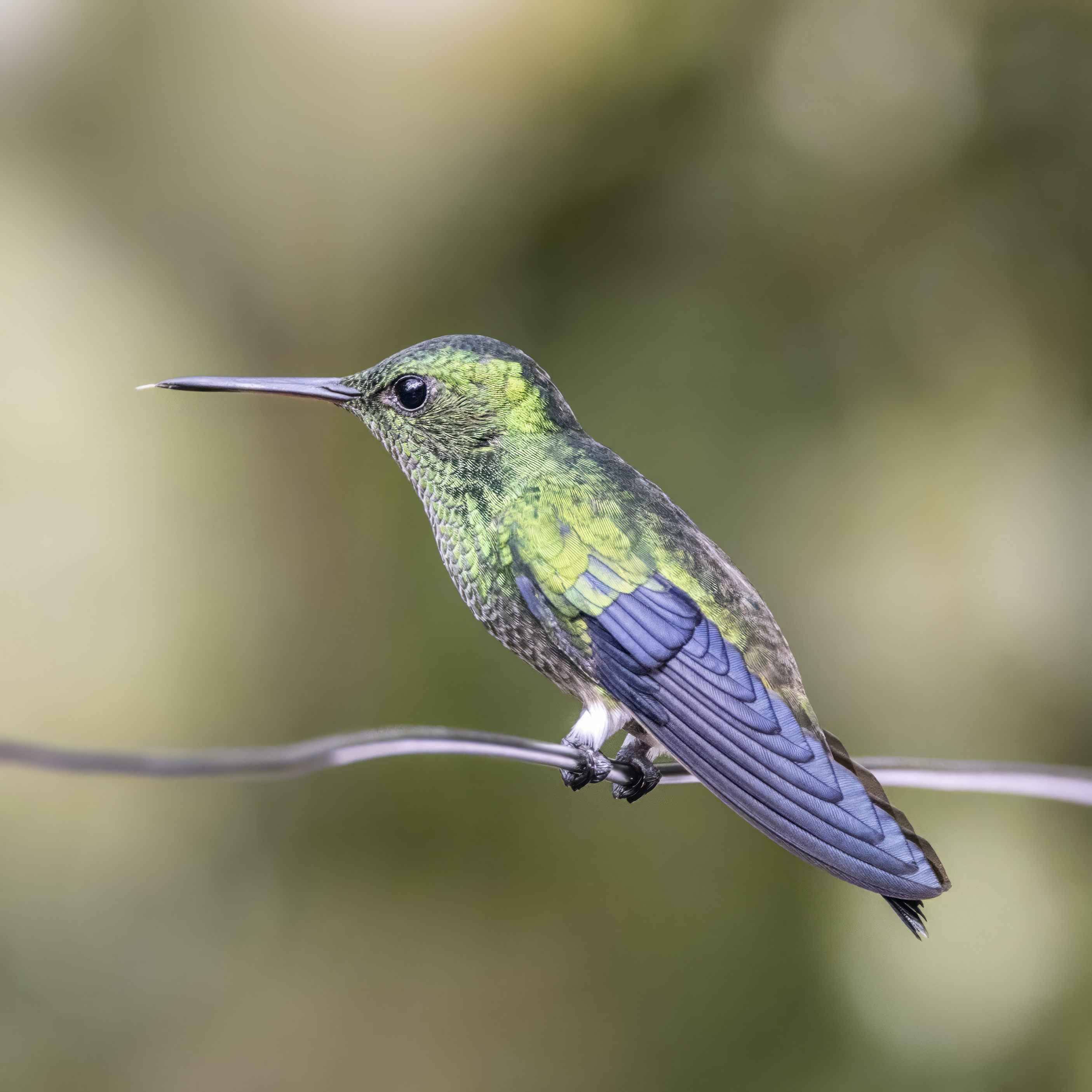
- Saucerottia saucerottei saucerottei, Colombia

Conservation status
- Least Concern (IUCN 3.1)
- CITES Appendix II

Scientific classification
- Kingdom: Animalia
- Phylum: Chordata
- Class: Aves
- Order: Apodiformes
- Family: Trochilidae
- Genus: Saucerottia
- Species: S. saucerottei

Binomial name
- Saucerottia saucerottei (Delattre & Bourcier, 1846)
- Range of S. saucerottei Year-round range

Synonyms
- Amazilia saucerottei

= Steely-vented hummingbird =

Species of bird

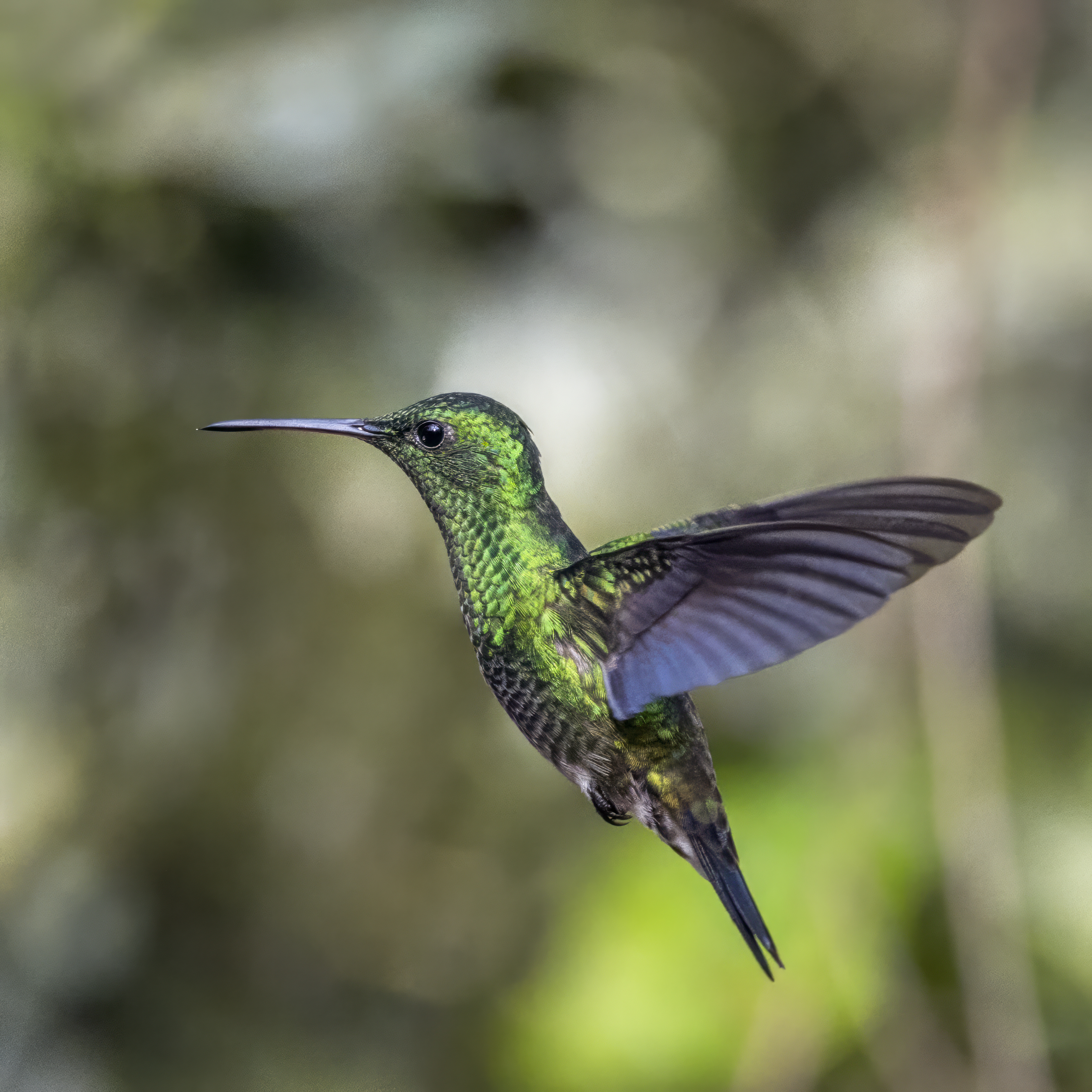

The steely-vented hummingbird (Saucerottia saucerottei) is a species of hummingbird in the "emeralds", tribe Trochilini of subfamily Trochilinae. It is found in Colombia and Venezuela.

== Taxonomy and systematics ==
The steely-vented hummingbird was formerly placed in the genus Amazilia. A molecular phylogenetic study published in 2014 found that the genus Amazilia was polyphyletic. In the revised classification to create monophyletic genera, the steely-vented hummingbird was moved by most taxonomic systems to the resurrected genus Saucerottia. However, BirdLife International's Handbook of the Birds of the World (HBW) retains it in Amazilia.

Most taxonomic systems assign the steely-vented hummingbird three subspecies, the nominate S. s. saucerottei, S. s. warscewiczi, and S. s. braccata. HBW includes as a fourth subspecies what the others treat as the separate blue-vented hummingbird (S. hoffmanni). In addition, in the late 1800s S. s. warscewiczi was treated as a separate species with S. s. braccata as a subspecies.

== Description ==
The steely-vented hummingbird is 8 to 11 cm (3.1 to 4.3 in) long and weighs about 4.4 to 5.0 g (0.16 to 0.18 oz). Both sexes of all subspecies have a black bill with a pinkish or reddish base to the mandible. Adult males of the nominate subspecies have golden-green upperparts with blue-black uppertail coverts. Their tail is also blue-black. Their underparts are dark glittering golden-green with greenish to steel blue undertail coverts. Adult females have some white on their throat feathers and grayish-brown undertail coverts. Immature birds somewhat resemble the female but are overall duller and have a partly dark gray throat, a grayish brown belly, and brownish edges to the back and rump feathers.

The other two subspecies differ little from the nominate. S. s. warscewiczi is somewhat smaller and has a purplish to bluish tinge to the uppertail coverts. S. s. braccata has purplish tips on the rump feathers and violet-blue to bluish uppertail coverts.

== Distribution and habitat ==
Subspecies S. s. warscewiczi of the steely-vented hummingbird is the northernmost. It is found in northern Colombia from Sucre Department east into western Zulia state in extreme northwestern Venezuela. The nominate S. s. saucerottei is found in western and north-central Colombia on the western slope of the Western Andes and in the Cauca River valley. S. s. braccata is found in the Andes of western Venezuela in the states of Trujillo and Mérida. (Note that the range map includes that of the Central American blue-vented hummingbird.)

The steely-vented hummingbird inhabits semi-open to open landscapes such as scrublands, savanna, the edges of mature forest, secondary forest, plantations, and gardens. Most of them tend to be somewhat arid. In most of its range it is found between sea level and 1,500 m (4,900 ft). S. s. braccata can usually be found up to 2,000 m (6,600 ft) and rarely as high as 3,000 m (9,800 ft).

== Behavior ==
=== Movement ===
The steely-vented hummingbird is essentially sedentary but might make local movements in response to availability of flowering plants.

=== Feeding ===
Little is known about the steely-vented hummingbird's feeding practices or diet. It is known to forage for nectar at low bushes and trees and is thought to be somewhat territorial.

=== Breeding ===
The steely-vented hummingbird apparently breeds at any time of the year in Colombia. Essentially nothing else is known about the species' breeding phenology. One nest was described as a simple cup "saddled" on a limb of an isolated tree about 8 m (26 ft) above the ground. The eggs, incubation period, and time to fledging have not been described.

=== Vocalization ===
The steely-vented hummingbird's song has not been described in words. Its calls have been described as "a high, sharp tsit or dry chit, sometimes uttered in sputtering series."

== Status ==
The IUCN follows HBW taxonomy and so has included the blue-vented hummingbird in its assessment of the steely-vented. It has assessed the combined species as being of Least Concern. It has a population of at least 500,000 mature individuals that is believed to be decreasing. No immediate threats have been identified. The steely-vented hummingbird sensu stricto is considered fairly common to common in most of its range and numerous in some habitats, and it occurs in at least one protected area.
