= Henry Whitely (ornithologist) =

English naturalist and explorer

Henry Whitely (18 June 1844, Woolwich - 11 July 1892 (or 1893), British Guiana) was an English naturalist and explorer. He was particularly interested in ornithology and entomology.

He made his first expedition to Japan in 1864, and the ornithological results were published in the Ibis. Later he collected birds in Peru, in Amazonia, and in British Guiana, where he resided mostly.

Among his bird discoveries are: Oreonympha nobilis Gould, Lophornis pavoninus Salvin, Hylocharis guianensis Boucard, Uranomitra whitelyi Boucard, Amazilia cupreicauda Salvin, Aglaeactis caumatonata Gould, Iolaema whitelyana Gould, Hemistephania guianensis Boucard, Milornis rupuninii Boucard and Eretnita whitelyi Boucard.

Besides bird skins he also made large collections of insects, chiefly Coleoptera and Lepidoptera, among which were many new species.

According to the Georgetown Daily Chronicle of July 30, 1892, Whitely died in his camp on the Annie Scapy River. According to an Indian companion who reported the incident to the authorities in Bartica, he was in a state of delirium from malaria and also depressed by the loss of his bird hunting haul when his boat sank. This was probably the reason why he eventually shot himself.
