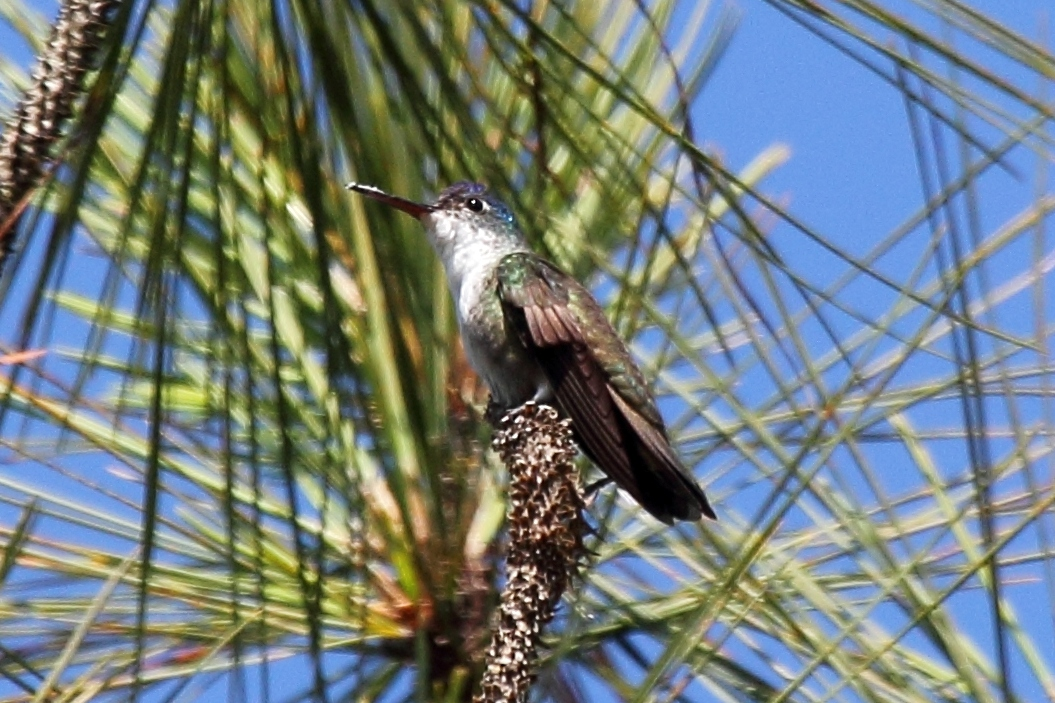

Conservation status
- Least Concern (IUCN 3.1)
- CITES Appendix II

Scientific classification
- Kingdom: Animalia
- Phylum: Chordata
- Class: Aves
- Order: Apodiformes
- Family: Trochilidae
- Genus: Saucerottia
- Species: S. cyanocephala

Binomial name
- Saucerottia cyanocephala (Lesson, 1830)

Synonyms
- Ornismya cyanocephalus Lesson 1829, Amazilia cyanocephala

= Azure-crowned hummingbird =

Species of bird

The azure-crowned hummingbird (Saucerottia cyanocephala) is a species of hummingbird in the "emeralds", tribe Trochilini of subfamily Trochilinae. It is found in Belize, El Salvador, Guatemala, Honduras, Mexico, and Nicaragua.

== Taxonomy and systematics ==
The azure-crowned hummingbird was originally described as Ornismya cyanocephalus and later moved into genus Amazilia. A molecular phylogenetic study published in 2014 found that Amazilia was polyphyletic. In the revised classification to create monophyletic genera, the azure-crowned hummingbird was moved by most taxonomic systems to the resurrected genus Saucerottia. However, BirdLife International's Handbook of the Birds of the World retains it in Amazilia.

The azure-crowned hummingbird has two subspecies, the nominate S. c. cyanocephala (Lesson, 1829) and S. c. chlorostephana (Howell, 1965).

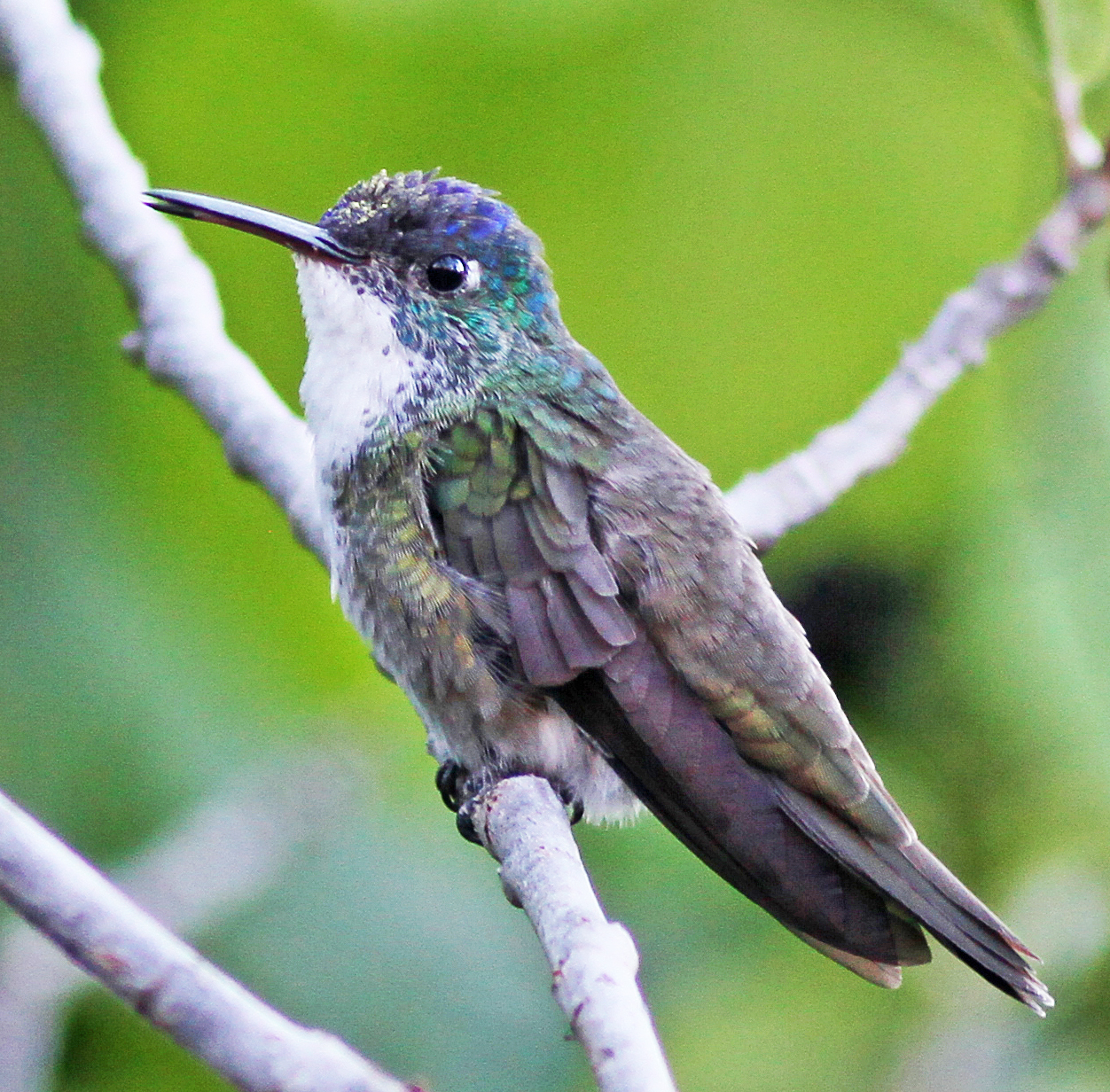
Lake Atitlan, Guatemala

== Description ==
The azure-crowned hummingbird is 10 to 11.5 cm (3.9 to 4.5 in) long. Males weigh an average of about 5.8 g (0.20 oz) and females average about 5.4 g (0.19 oz). The bills of both sexes of both subspecies have a black maxilla and a dull pink mandible with a black outer third. Within a subspecies the sexes are almost alike. Adult males of the nominate subspecies have a bright metallic blue crown and females a duller blue to greenish blue crown. Both sexes have metallic bronze nape and back. They have greenish bronze to bronze green rump, uppertail coverts, and tail. Their face is mostly bluish green. Their underparts from chin to vent are white with metallic bronze green sides to the breast and duller bronze green flanks. Immatures are similar to the adults but duller, and with grayish buff tips to the uppertail coverts, whitish tips on the outer tail feathers, and a buff wash to the underparts. Subspecies S. c. chlorostephana is somewhat smaller than the nominate. Its plumage is essentially the same as that of the nominate but with a glittering green instead of metallic blue crown.

== Distribution and habitat ==
The nominate subspecies of azure-crowned hummingbird is found from the Mexican state of Tamaulipas south through Belize, Guatemala, and El Salvador into north central Nicaragua. It inhabits the edges of humid evergreen forest, oak and pine-oak forest, scrublands, and secondary forest. In elevation it ranges between 600 and 2,400 m (2,000 and 7,900 ft). Subspecies S. c. chlorostephana's range is disjunct, on the Mosquito Coast of eastern Honduras and northeastern Nicaragua. This subspecies primarily inhabits pine savanna at low elevation.

== Behavior ==
=== Movement ===
The azure-crowned hummingbird is mostly sedentary but might make some local seasonal movements.

=== Feeding ===
The azure-crowned hummingbird forages for nectar from the understory to the forest canopy, but details of its diet are lacking. It forages both by trap-lining and defending feeding territories. In the pine savanna it has been noted hovering at clusters of needles and bark crevices, but it is not known if it was hunting arthropods or visiting the flowers of epiphytes.

=== Breeding ===
The azure-crowned hummingbird's breeding season varies geographically but overall appears to span at least from February to July. It makes a cup nest that apparently varies in materials depending on what is locally available. It is usually placed in a branch fork or "saddled" over a branch, but in urban areas some have been noted on utility wires.

=== Vocalization ===
One vocalization of the azure-crowned hummingbird is "a low, fairly hard, buzzy dzzzrt" that is given in flight and perched; when perched it might be "repeated steadily". It also makes a "fairly mellow, strong chipping [that] at times run into a trill or rattle." The vocalizations of isolated subspecies S. c. chlorostephana might be different but have not been separately described.

== Status ==
The IUCN has assessed the azure-crowned hummingbird as being of Least Concern. It has a large range and an estimated population of at least 500,000 mature individuals, though the latter is believed to be decreasing. No immeditate threats have been identified. "Human activity probably has little short term effect on Azure-crowned Hummingbird".
