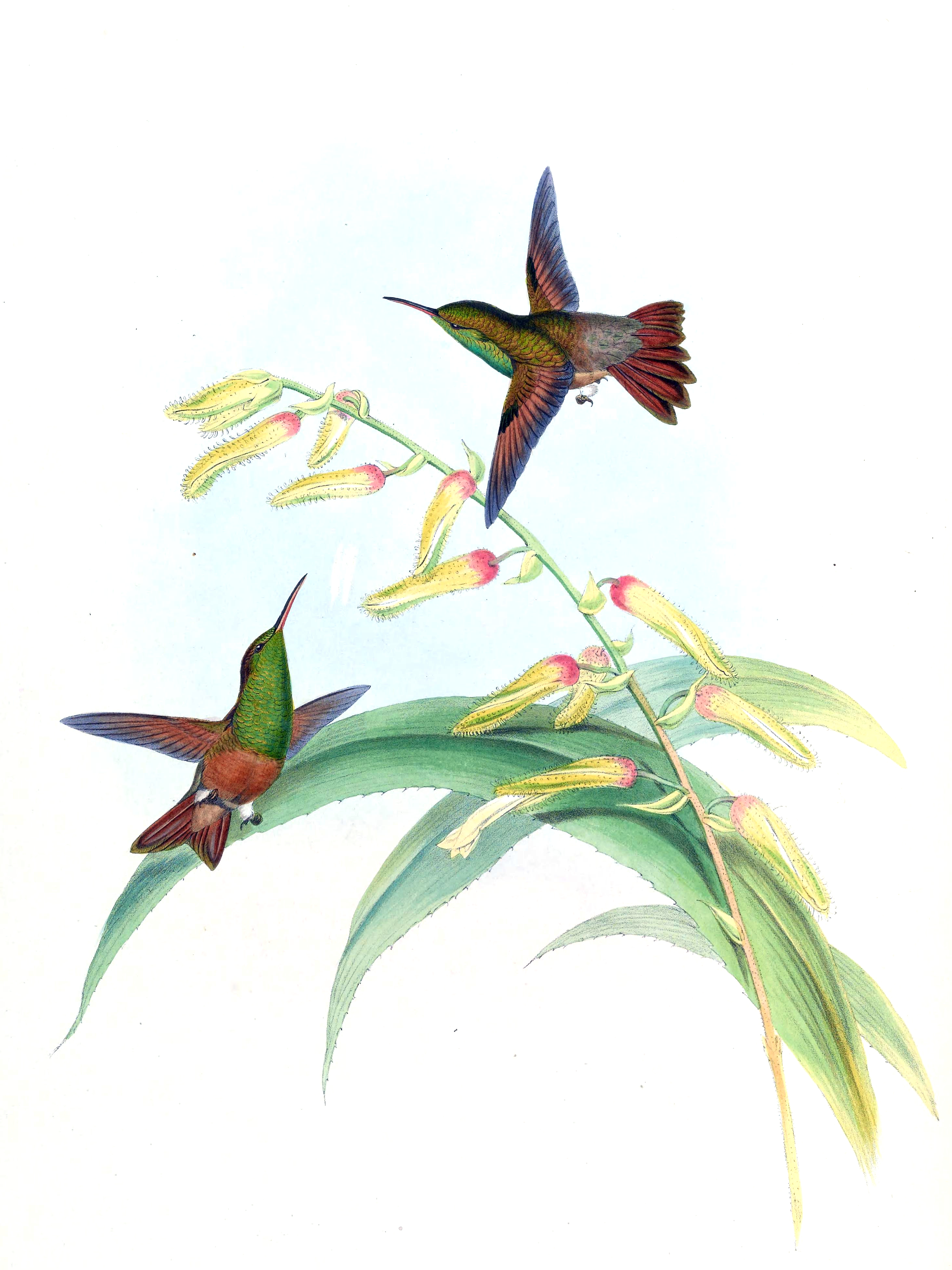

Conservation status
- Near Threatened (IUCN 3.1)
- CITES Appendix II

Scientific classification
- Kingdom: Animalia
- Phylum: Chordata
- Class: Aves
- Order: Apodiformes
- Family: Trochilidae
- Genus: Saucerottia
- Species: S. castaneiventris

Binomial name
- Saucerottia castaneiventris (Gould, 1856)

Synonyms
- Amazilia castaneiventris

= Chestnut-bellied hummingbird =

Species of bird

The chestnut-bellied hummingbird (Saucerottia castaneiventris) is a Near Threatened species of hummingbird in the "emeralds", tribe Trochilini of subfamily Trochilinae. It is endemic to Colombia.

== Taxonomy and systematics ==
The chestnut-bellied hummingbird was formerly placed in the genus Amazilia. A molecular phylogenetic study published in 2014 found that the genus Amazilia was polyphyletic. In the revised classification to create monophyletic genera, the chestnut-bellied hummingbird was moved by most taxonomic systems to the resurrected genus Saucerottia. However, BirdLife International's Handbook of the Birds of the World (HBW) retains it in Amazilia.

The chestnut-bellied hummingbird is monotypic.

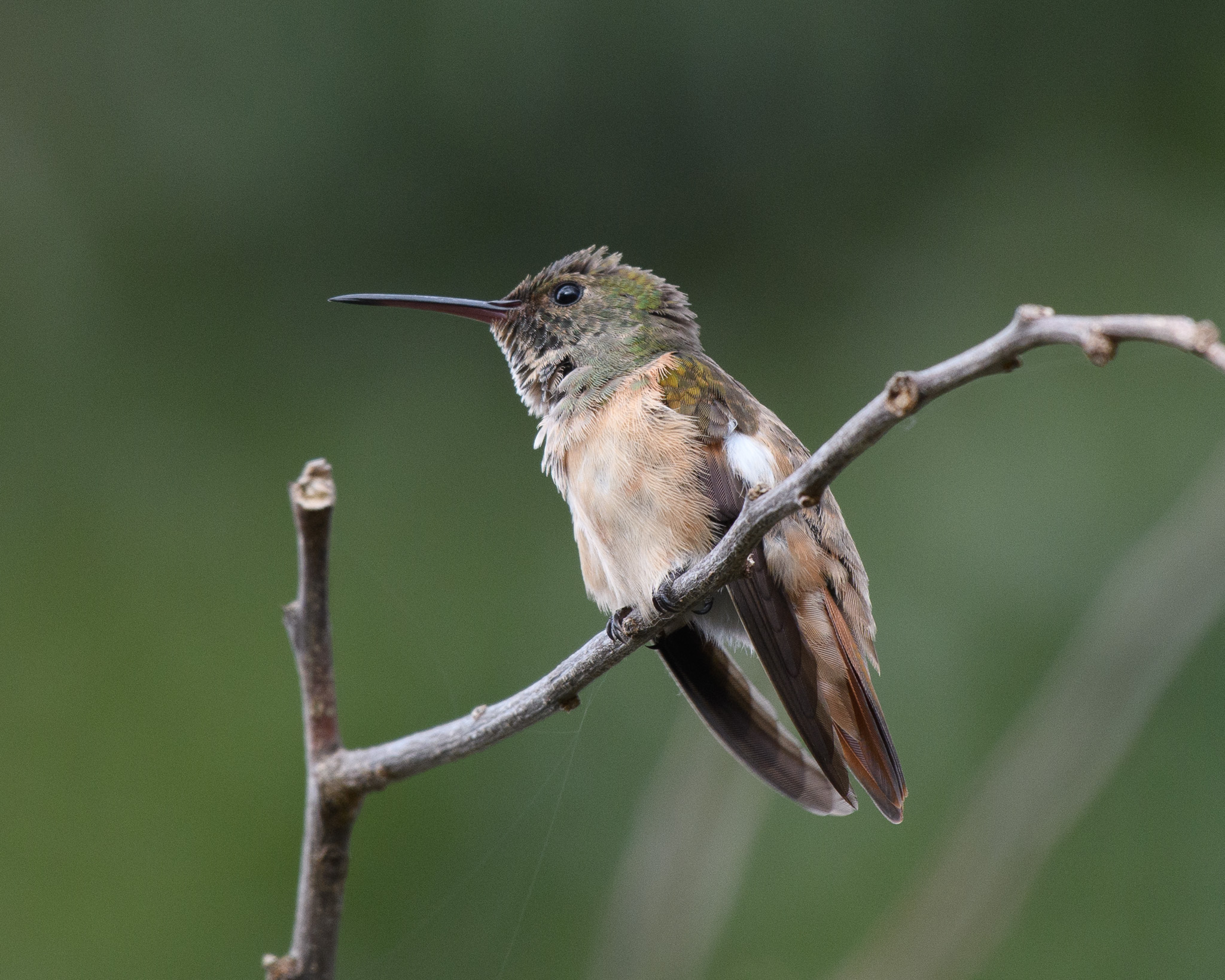
Female chestnut-bellied hummingbird

== Description ==
The chestnut-bellied hummingbird is about 9 cm (3.5 in) long. Both sexes have a black bill with a red base to the mandible. The adult male has bronze-green upperparts and a chestnut tail. Its throat and upper breast are glittering green, the belly chestnut, and the undertail coverts chestnut with greenish edges. The female is similar but with a slightly paler belly and white bars near the end of some throat feathers. Immatures are similar to the female with rufous edges on the feathers of the neck and rump.

== Distribution and habitat ==
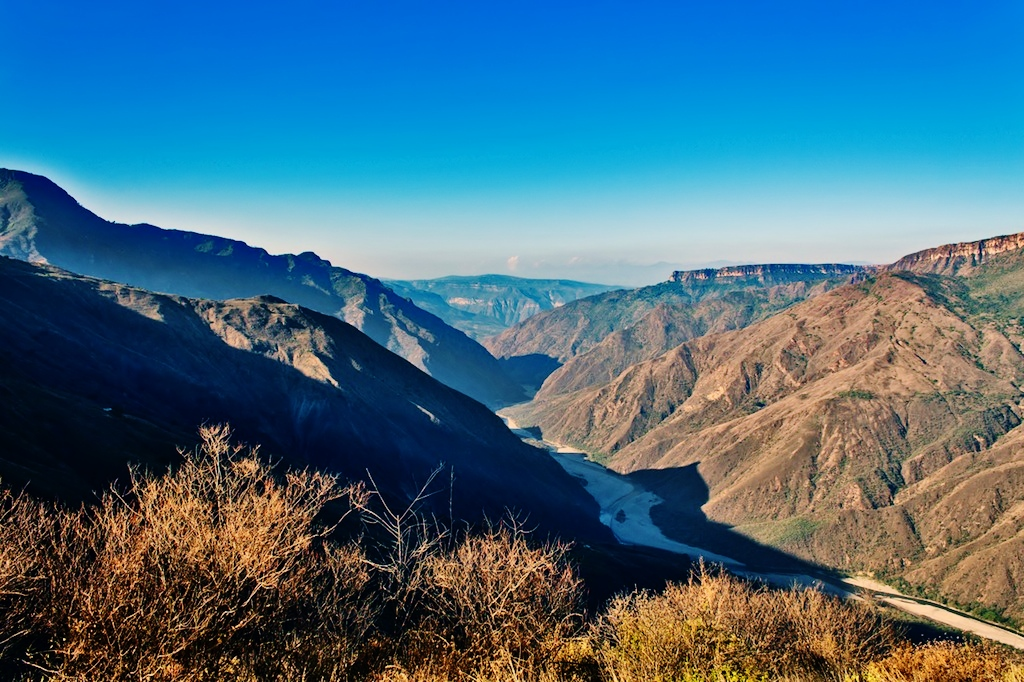
Chicamocha Canyon

The chestnut-bellied hummingbird appears to be restricted to the dryer parts of the Magdalena Valley of Colombia, with a core known range in the Chicamocha, Suárez and Chucurí River valleys. As of 2019 it was known from at least 14 sites. However, it is not regularly documented at most of them, perhaps because of unknown seasonal movements. Most records are from arid brushy canyons with a few from the lower edges of humid montane forest. Most records are from elevations between 500 and 1,500 m (1,600 and 4,900 ft) but some extend to between 340 and 2,200 m (1,100 and 7,200 ft) and one is at 120 m (390 ft).

== Behavior ==
=== Movement ===
The chestnut-bellied hummingbird is believed to move from higher to lower elevations after the breeding season.

=== Feeding ===
Details are lacking about the chestnut-bellied hummingbird's feeding technique and diet, but it is known to take nectar from Salvia and Trichanthera. It also feeds on small arthropods.

=== Breeding ===
Specimens of chestnut-bellied hummingbird in breeding condition suggest that its breeding season is from August to December. Nothing else is known about its breeding phenology and its nest has not been described.

=== Vocalization ===
The chestnut-bellied hummingbird's song is "a short rhythmic phrase of three squeaky notes that sounds like a rusty door-hinge, 'krey-ki-cheep ... tsew ... krey-ki-cheep ...'." It also makes calls described as " a slightly buzzy 'tzee', a high-pitched 'see' and a stuttering high-pitched chattering."

== Status and threats ==
The IUCN originally assessed the chestnut-bellied hummingbird as Threatened, then in 1994 Endangered, in 2000 Critically Endangered, in 2009 again Endangered, and since 2019 as Near Threatened. Its population is estimated at between 10,000 and 20,000 mature individuals and believed to be decreasing.

The chestnut-bellied hummingbird is located in the dense population region of Colombia. In the twenty-first century there has been expansive economic growth, due to a gold rush in 1996 and also increasing logging. Not only are the forests being cut down, but also sugar and coffee plantations are replacing them. Decreased habitats and increased pollution and human migration accompanied these new industries. Although these businesses are benefitting the Colombian economy, they are by far the largest threats to the habitat of the species.
