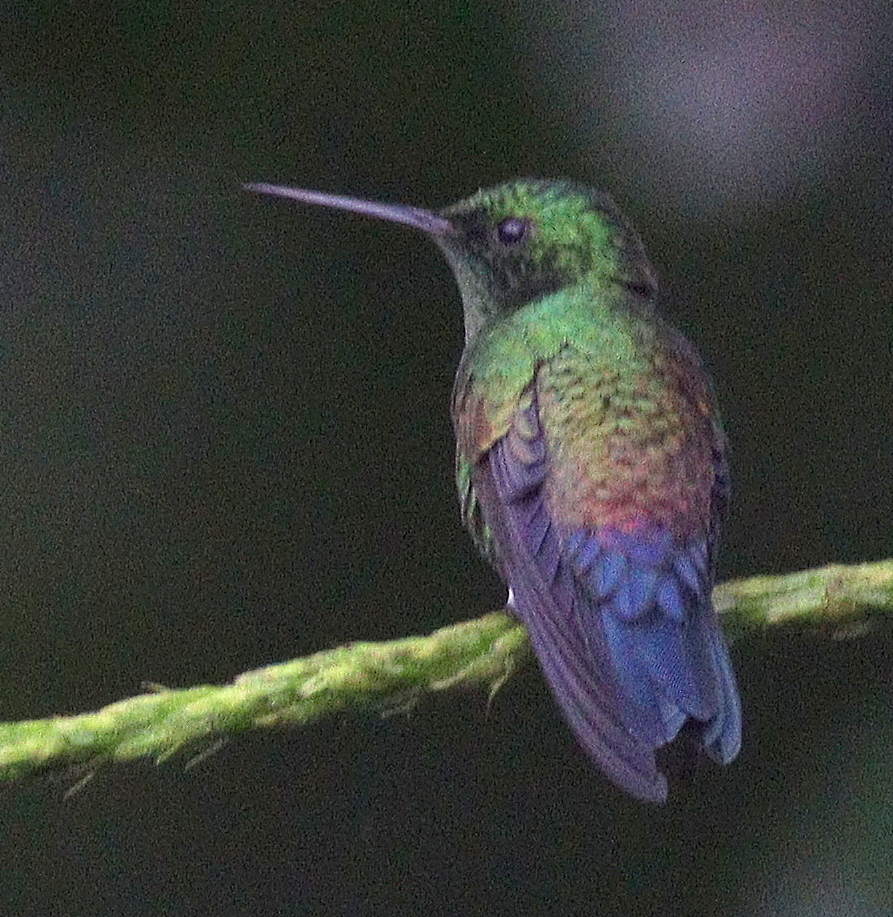

Conservation status
- CITES Appendix II

Scientific classification
- Kingdom: Animalia
- Phylum: Chordata
- Class: Aves
- Order: Apodiformes
- Family: Trochilidae
- Genus: Saucerottia
- Species: S. hoffmanni

Binomial name
- Saucerottia hoffmanni (Cabanis & Heine, 1860)

Synonyms
- Amazilia saucerottei hoffmanni

= Blue-vented hummingbird =

Species of bird

The blue-vented hummingbird (Saucerottia hoffmanni) is a species of hummingbird in the "emeralds", tribe Trochilini of subfamily Trochilinae. It is found in Costa Rica and Nicaragua.

== Taxonomy and systematics ==
The blue-vented hummingbird was formerly placed in the genus Amazilia as a subspecies of the steely-vented hummingbird (then Amazilia saucerottei, now Saucerottia saucerottei). A molecular phylogenetic study published in 2014 found that the genus Amazilia was polyphyletic. In the revised classification to create monophyletic genera, most taxonomic systems accepted the blue-vented hummingbird as a separate species and moved it to the resurrected genus Saucerottia. However, BirdLife International's Handbook of the Birds of the World (HBW) retains it as the steely-vented subspecies Amazilia saucerottei hoffmanni.

The blue-vented hummingbird is monotypic.

== Description ==

The blue-vented hummingbird is 8 to 11 cm (3.1 to 4.3 in) long and weighs an average of 4.45 g (0.16 oz). Both sexes have a straight bill with a blackish maxilla and a coral-red mandible with a dark tip. Adult males have golden-green upperparts with coppery to purplish rump and uppertail coverts. Their underparts are dark glittering golden-green with greenish to steel blue undertail coverts. Their tail is pale steel blue and slightly forked. Adult females are similar but with a duller green lower breast and belly. Their throat feathers have white bars near the end, the feathers of their vent area have grayish-buff edges, and their outer tail feathers have purplish tips. Juveniles are darker than adults and duller green below with a grayish-brown belly. Their throat is darkish gray and their back and rump feathers have brownish edges.

== Distribution and habitat ==
The blue-vented hummingbird is found from southern Nicaragua to central Costa Rica. It inhabits semi-open landscapes such as scrublands, savanna, the edges of mature forest, secondary forest, and gardens. It tends to prefer dryish habitats except in the dry season, when it is found in moister areas. In elevation it ranges from sea level to at most 1,800 m (5,900 ft).

== Behavior ==
=== Movement ===
The blue-vented hummingbird makes local movements, in part to follow flowering events.

=== Feeding ===
The blue-vented hummingbird forages for nectar at a wide variety of plants, vines, shrubs, and trees. It tends to forage only as high as the tops of small trees and often defends feeding territories. In addition to nectar if feeds on insects that it captures on the wing and sometimes from the surface of water.

=== Breeding ===
Almost nothing is known about the blue-vented hummingbird's breeding phenology except that its breeding season appears to span at least from December to April. It builds a cup nest of plant down and cobweb with lichen on the outside. One nest in Costa Rica was on a dead Cecropia branch and another on a Ficus vine.

=== Vocalization ===
The blue-vented hummingbird's song is "a repeated buzzy, squeaky phrase tzi-tzee-tzup, sometimes followed by a few lower-pitched notes, tzi-tzee-tzup ... wut-chur-up." It also makes calls described as "a high, sharp tsit or dry chit, sometimes uttered in sputtering series."

== Status ==
The IUCN follows HBW taxonomy and so has not assessed the blue-vented hummingbird separately from the steely-vented hummingbird sensu lato.
