= Antoine Constant Saucerotte =

French physician (1805–1884)

- Born: 13 August 1805; Moscow, Russian Empire
- Died: 3 November 1884 (aged 79); Lunéville, Meurthe-et-Moselle, France
- Years active: 1828-1862
- Medical career
- Profession: Physician
- Sub-specialties: Popular science

Antoine Constant Saucerotte (13 August 1805 in Moscow - 3 November 1884 in Lunéville) was a French medical doctor known in the 19th century for his popularisation work.

== Early life and education ==
Constant Saucerotte was the son of Vïctor Joseph Saucerotte, dental surgeon of the Empresses Maria Feodorovna (widow of Paul I) and Elizabeth Alexeievna (wife of Alexander I), in Saint Petersburg, who returned to Lunéville in 1820. His mother was Marie Louise Jolly.

He was the grandson of Nicolas Saucerotte (fr), Surgeon-Major of the army of the North then of the Army of Sambre and Meuse during the French Revolution.

After entering France with his father, he completed his classical studies in philosophy at the Royal College of Nancy in 1824. The same year he began medical studies at the Faculty of Paris.

After defending his thesis in 1828 he returned to Lunéville and married his cousin, Anne Saucerotte, on 25 August 1828.

== Career ==
In 1830, when the chair of philosophy became vacant at the college of Lunéville, he applied for it and obtained it. He began to popularise difficult subjects in his teaching in order to make them better understood by his pupils. Shortly after his appointment as Professor of Philosophy, he founded the teaching of natural history at the college and composed a small treatise for primary schools which was published in up to 21 editions. Isidore Geoffroy Saint-Hilaire then proposed him to obtain the Ordre des Palmes académiques.

At the same time he published several works in various medical academies (Caen, Pont-à-Mousson, Dijon, Brussels etc...).

On 17 June 1834, the Académie Nationale de Médecine honoured him by appointing him a corresponding member. On 14 September 1838, he was appointed Chief Physician of the Civil and Military Hospital of Lunéville which enabled him to publish numerous observations in the "Bulletin général de thérapeutique", the "Gazette médicale de Paris" and the weekly Gazette. His name soon acquired an honourable reputation in France as well as abroad, so that when, in 1846, August Wilhelm Henschel began publishing a journal of history and medical literature in Breslau, which he named Janus, he asked Saucerotte for permission to register him as a French collaborator with Émile Littré and Charles Victor Daremberg.

In 1860, he left his chair of philosophy, then in 1862 his post as chief doctor of the civil hospital of Lunéville due to illness, but continued to write and publish, notably in 1863, when he published a book entitled: History and Philosophy in their Relationship with Medicine, where "he sought to prove that medicine and philosophy are two sisters whose good agreement is necessary for the fulfilment of human destinies."

== Works ==
- Essai sur les altérations des liquides considérées comme causes ou complication des maladies. Thèse de médecine présentée à la Faculté de médecine de Paris (in French). Paris: Didot le jeune. 1828.
- Éléments d'histoire naturelle présentant dans une suite de tableaux synoptiques, accompagné de figures, un précis complet de cette science (in French) (2nd ed.). Paris: J. Delalain. 1839.,available at Gallica
- Petite hygiène des écoles. Simples notions sur les soins que réclame la conservation de la santé (in French) (20th ed.). Paris: Delalain frères. 1892.
- Petite chimie des écoles. Simples notions sur les applications les plus utiles de cette science à l'agriculture, à l'industrie et à l'économie domestique (in French) (9th ed.). Paris: Delalain frères. 1887.
- Les médecins au théâtre depuis Molière (in French). Paris: Dentu. 1881.
- Éléments d'histoire naturelle présentant une suite de tableaux synoptiques, accompagnés de figures, un précis complet de cette science. Minéralogie et géologie. Botanique. Zoologie. Paris and Lunéville: Jules Delalain & Roret & Creusat. 1836.
- Conseils sur la santé. Hygiène des classes industrielles (in French). Paris: L. Colas. 1827.
- Essai sur le régime alimentaire des anciens (in French). Paris: impr. de F. Malteste. 1860.
- Histoire critique de la doctrine physiologique; suivie de Considérations sur l'histoire philosophique de la médecine, et sur l'hippocratisme moderne (in French). Paris: J.-B. Baillère. 1847.
- L'histoire et la philosophie dans leurs rapports avec la médecine (in French). Paris: V. Masson et fils. 1863.
- L'Esprit de Montaigne. Choix des meilleurs chapitres et des plus beaux passages des "Essais", disposés dans un ordre méthodique, avec notes et commentaires. Paris: Perrin. 1886.
- Les Médecins pendant la Révolution, 1789-99 (posthumous work, published by his family). Paris: Perrin. 1887.

== Distinctions ==
- Officer of the Ordre des Palmes académiques
- Chevalier of the Legion of Honour (14 July 1866).
