= Adolphe Delattre =

French ornithologist

(Pierre) Adolphe Delattre (or De Lattre) (French pronunciation: [adɔlf dəlatʁ]; 12 February 1805, Tours – 3 January 1854, Nice) was a French ornithologist.

Between 1831 and 1851 he made several expeditions to America, where he was particularly interested in collecting hummingbirds. He named a number of new species, either alone or with Jules Bourcier. In 1839, with naturalist René Primevère Lesson, he described seven species of hummingbird.

He is commemorated in the binomial of the rufous-crested coquette, Lophornis delattrei.
