= Jules Bourcier =

French naturalist and expert on hummingbirds

- Born: 19 February 1797; Cuisery, Saône-et-Loire, France
- Died: 9 March 1873 (aged 76); Batignolles, Paris
- Known for: Descriptions de nouvelles espèces d'oiseaux-mouches, 1839 (with Martial Étienne Mulsant and Jules Verreaux); Collection typique d'oiseaux mouches (Trochilidés), 1874
- Scientific career
- Fields: Ornithology (especially hummingbirds)
- Author abbrev. (botany): Bourcier

Claude Marie Jules Bourcier (French pronunciation: [klod maʁi ʒyl buʁsje]; 19 February 1797 – 9 March 1873) was a French naturalist and expert on hummingbirds.

== Biography ==
Bourcier was born in Cuisery, Saône-et-Loire. He was the mayor of Millery, Rhône from 1832 to 1837, and he was the French consul to Ecuador from 1849 to 1850. In 1857, he became a corresponding member of the Société linnéenne de Lyon.

Bourcier named a number of new hummingbird species, either alone or with other ornithologists, such as Adolphe Delattre and Martial Etienne Mulsant.

The following hummingbird species bear his name:

- Colibri de Bourcier (Polyonymus caroli), described by Bourcier in 1847;
- Phaethornis bourcieri, described by René Primevère Lesson in 1832.

A species of South American snake, Saphenophis boursieri, was named in his honor by Giorgio Jan in 1867. The terrestrial mollusk genus Bourciera was named after him, based on specimens he collected for Louis Pfeiffer.

He died in Batignolles, Paris, in 1873.

== Publications ==
- Descriptions de nouvelles espèces d'oiseaux-mouches, 1839 (with Martial Étienne Mulsant & Jules Verreaux)
- Collection typique d'oiseaux mouches (Trochilidés), 1874 (posthumous)

== Sources ==
- Beolens, Bo; Watkins, Michael (2003). Whose Bird?: Men and women commemorated in the common names of birds. London: Christopher Helm. 400 pp. ISBN 978-0713666472.
