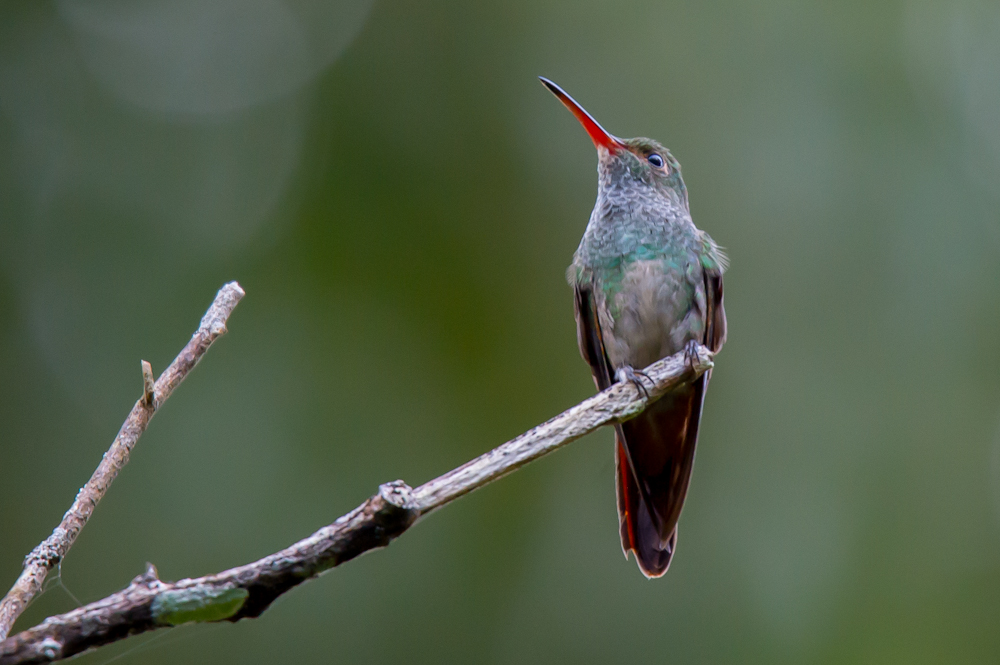
- female bird

Conservation status
- Least Concern (IUCN 3.1)
- CITES Appendix II

Scientific classification
- Kingdom: Animalia
- Phylum: Chordata
- Class: Aves
- Order: Apodiformes
- Family: Trochilidae
- Genus: Polyerata
- Species: P. decora

Binomial name
- Polyerata decora Salvin, 1891

= Charming hummingbird =

Species of bird

The charming hummingbird (Polyerata decora) and also known as the beryl-crowned hummingbird is a species of hummingbird in the family Trochilidae, found in Costa Rica and Panama. Its natural habitats are subtropical or tropical moist lowland forest and heavily degraded former forest. Staying within the exterior of forests, it searches for scattered flowers and various arthropods for food.

Due to its longer beak and wings, and slight coloring differences, it has been placed in its own species separate from the blue-chested hummingbird.

Leks of up to 12 male birds will sing together in hopes of attracting a mate.

This species was formerly placed in the genus Amazilia. A molecular phylogenetic study published in 2014 found that Amazilia was polyphyletic. In the revised classification to create monophyletic genera, the charming hummingbird was moved to the resurrected genus Polyerata.
