= List of birds of Arkansas =

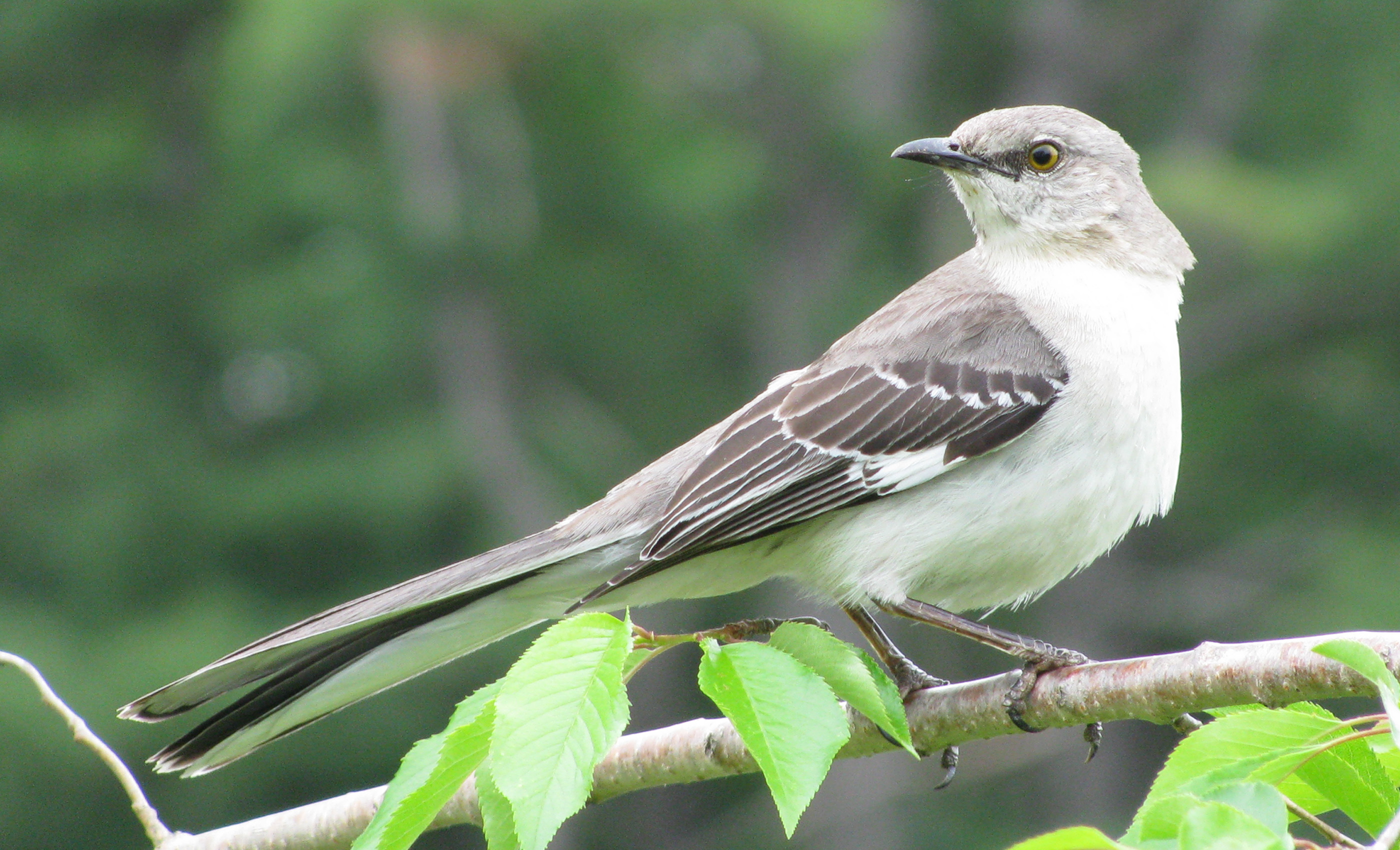
The northern mockingbird is the state bird of Arkansas.

This list of birds of Arkansas includes species documented in the U.S. state of Arkansas and accepted by the Arkansas Audubon Society (AAS). As of January 2022, there were 424 species included in the official list. Of them, 48 are classed as very rare, four are classed as occasional, 53 are classed as accidental, five have been introduced to North America, three are known to be extinct, and five have been extirpated. An additional accidental species has been added from another source.

Only birds that are considered to have established, self-sustaining, wild populations in Arkansas are included on this list. This means that birds that are considered probable escapees, although they may have been sighted flying free in Arkansas, are not included.

This list is presented in the taxonomic sequence of the Check-list of North and Middle American Birds, 7th edition through the 62nd Supplement, published by the American Ornithological Society (AOS). Common and scientific names are also those of the Check-list, except that the common names of families are from the Clements taxonomy because the AOS list does not include them.

The following codes are used to designate some species:

- (VR) Very rare - "encountered at irregular or infrequent intervals" per the AAS
- (O) Occasional - "occasional, 3-4 state records overall with at least 2 records since 1950" per the AAS
- (A) Accidental - "1-2 state records" per the AAS
- (I) Introduced - Species established in North America as a result of human action
- (E) Extinct - a recent species that no longer exists
- (Ex) Extirpated - a species no longer found in Arkansas but which continues to exist elsewhere

== Ducks, geese, and waterfowl ==
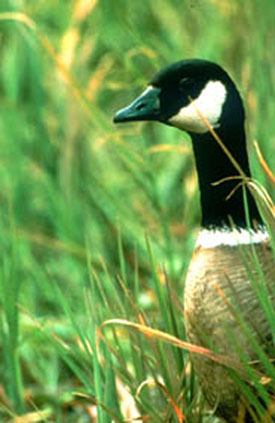
Cackling goose

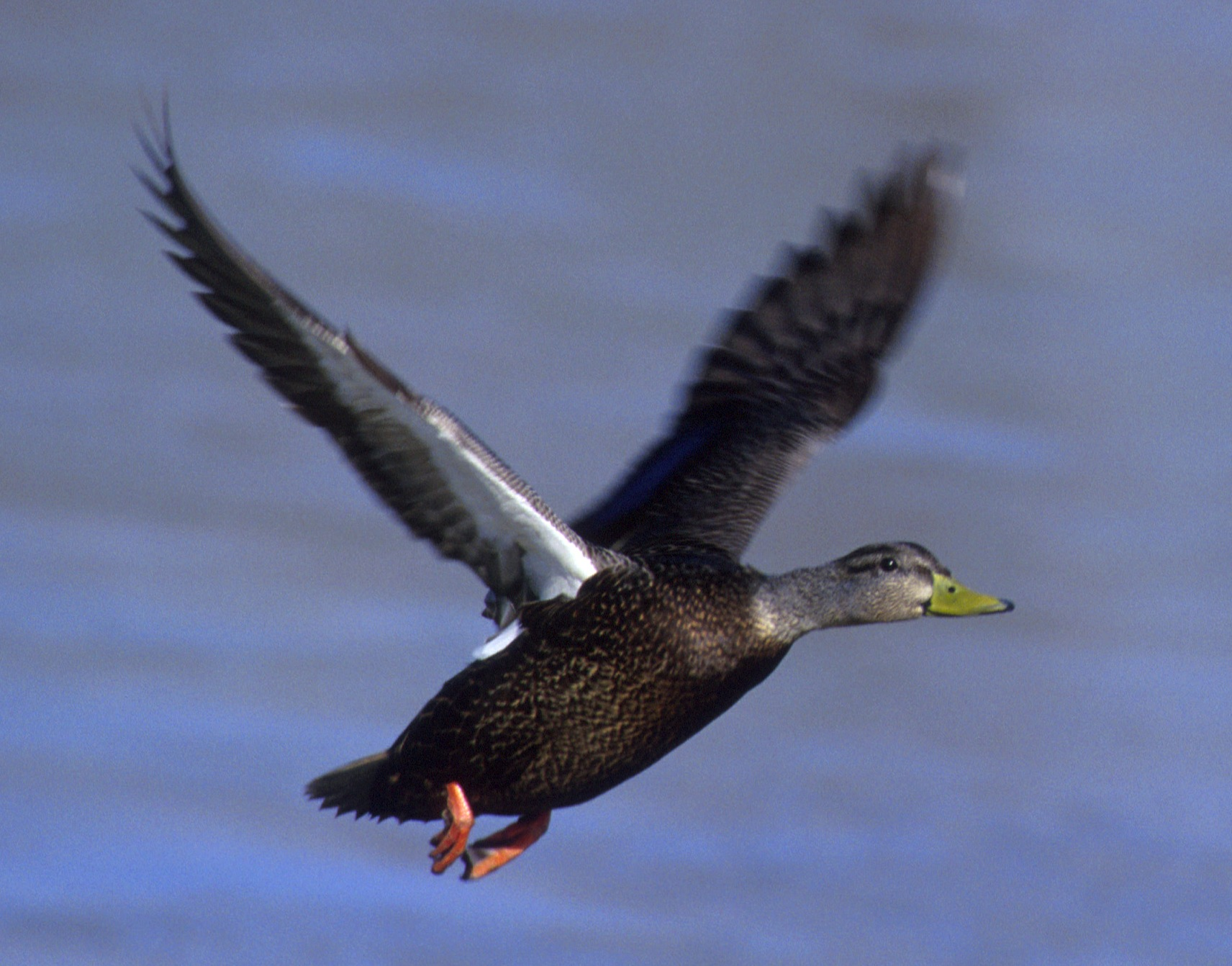
American black duck

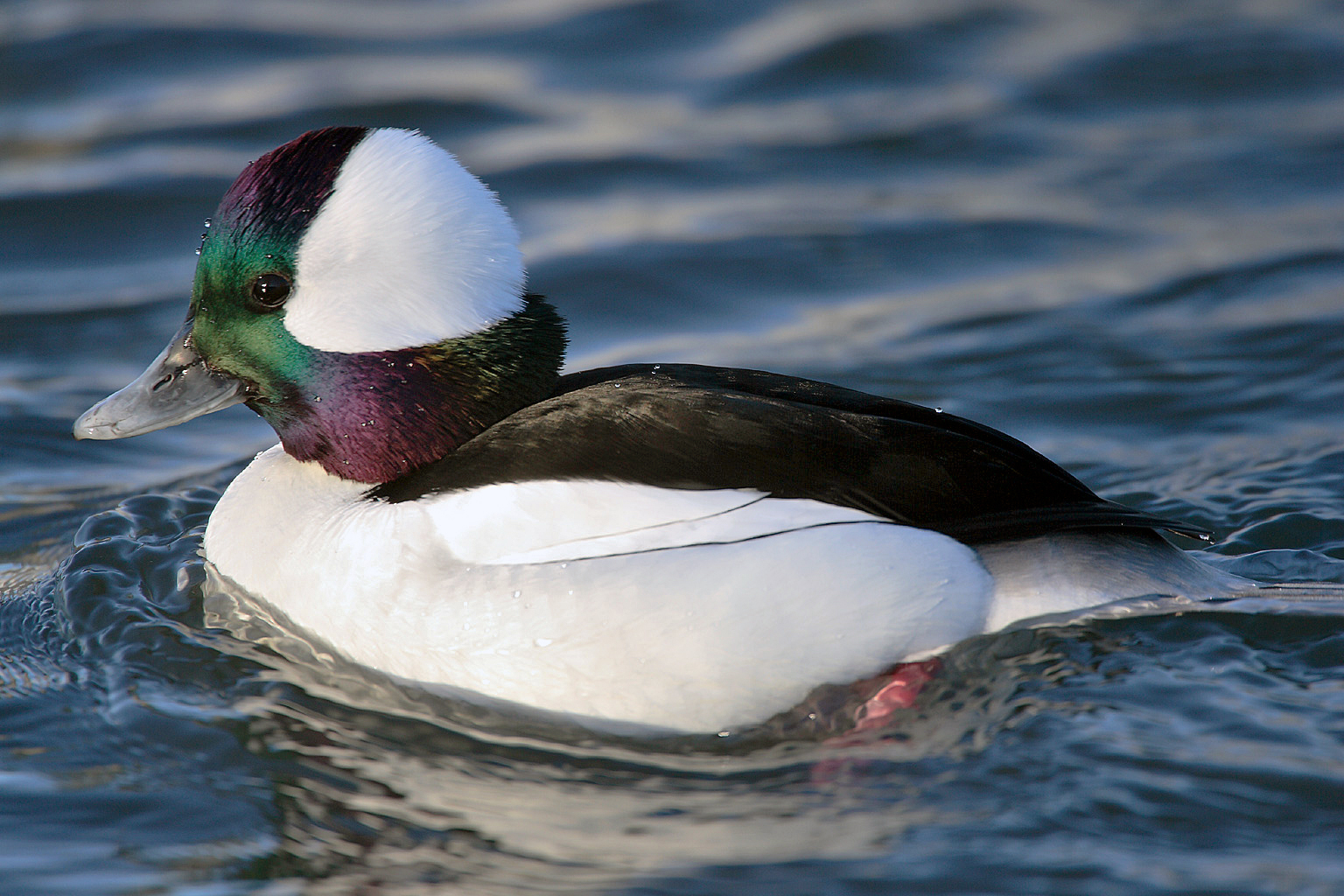
Bufflehead

Order: Anseriformes Family: Anatidae

The family Anatidae includes the ducks and most duck-like waterfowl, such as geese and swans. These birds are adapted to an aquatic existence with webbed feet, bills which are flattened to a greater or lesser extent, and feathers that are excellent at shedding water due to special oils.

- Black-bellied whistling-duck, Dendrocygna autumnalis
- Fulvous whistling-duck, Dendrocygna bicolor
- Snow goose, Anser caerulescens
- Ross's goose, Anser rossii
- Greater white-fronted goose, Anser albifrons
- Tundra bean-goose, Anser serrirostris (A)
- Brant, Branta bernicla (A)
- Barnacle goose, Branta leucopsis (A)
- Cackling goose, Branta hutchinsii
- Canada goose, Branta canadensis
- Mute swan, Cygnus olor (I) (VR)
- Trumpeter swan, Cygnus buccinator
- Tundra swan, Cygnus columbianus
- Wood duck, Aix sponsa
- Blue-winged teal, Spatula discors
- Cinnamon teal, Spatula cyanoptera (VR)
- Northern shoveler, Spatula clypeata
- Gadwall, Mareca strepera
- Eurasian wigeon, Mareca penelope (A)
- American wigeon, Mareca americana
- Mallard, Anas platyrhynchos
- American black duck, Anas rubripes
- Mottled duck, Anas fulvigula (C)
- Northern pintail, Anas acuta
- Garganey, Anas querquedula (A)
- Green-winged teal, Anas crecca
- Canvasback, Aythya valisineria
- Redhead, Aythya americana
- Ring-necked duck, Aythya collaris
- Tufted duck, Aythya fuligula (A)
- Greater scaup, Aythya marila
- Lesser scaup, Aythya affinis
- Surf scoter, Melanitta perspicillata
- White-winged scoter, Melanitta deglandi
- Black scoter, Melanitta americana (VR)
- Long-tailed duck, Clangula hyemalis
- Bufflehead, Bucephala albeola
- Common goldeneye, Bucephala clangula
- Barrow's goldeneye, Bucephala islandica (VR)
- Hooded merganser, Lophodytes cucullatus
- Common merganser, Mergus merganser
- Red-breasted merganser, Mergus serrator
- Ruddy duck, Oxyura jamaicensis

== New World quail ==
Order: Galliformes Family: Odontophoridae

The New World quails are small, plump terrestrial birds only distantly related to the quails of the Old World, but named for their similar appearance and habits.

- Northern bobwhite, Colinus virginianus

== Pheasants, grouse, and allies ==
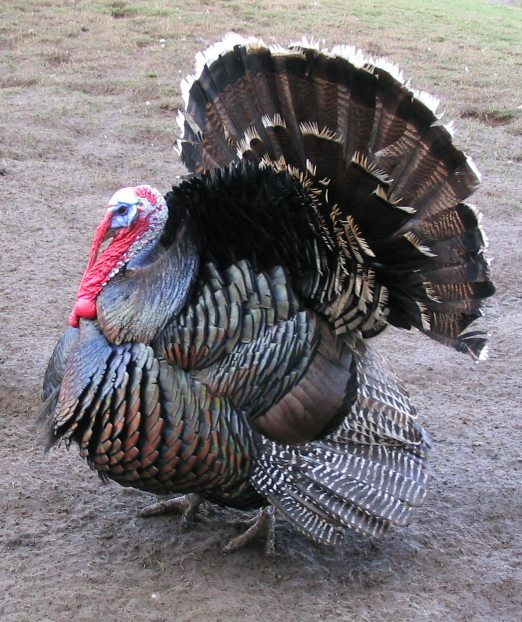
Wild turkey

Order: Galliformes Family: Phasianidae

Phasianidae consists of the pheasants and their allies including the partridges, grouse, turkeys and old world quail. These are terrestrial species, variable in size but generally plump, with broad, relatively short wings. Many species are gamebirds or have been domesticated as a food source for humans.

- Wild turkey, Meleagris gallopavo
- Ruffed grouse, Bonasa umbellus (Ex)
- Greater prairie-chicken, Tympanuchus cupido (Ex)

== Grebes ==
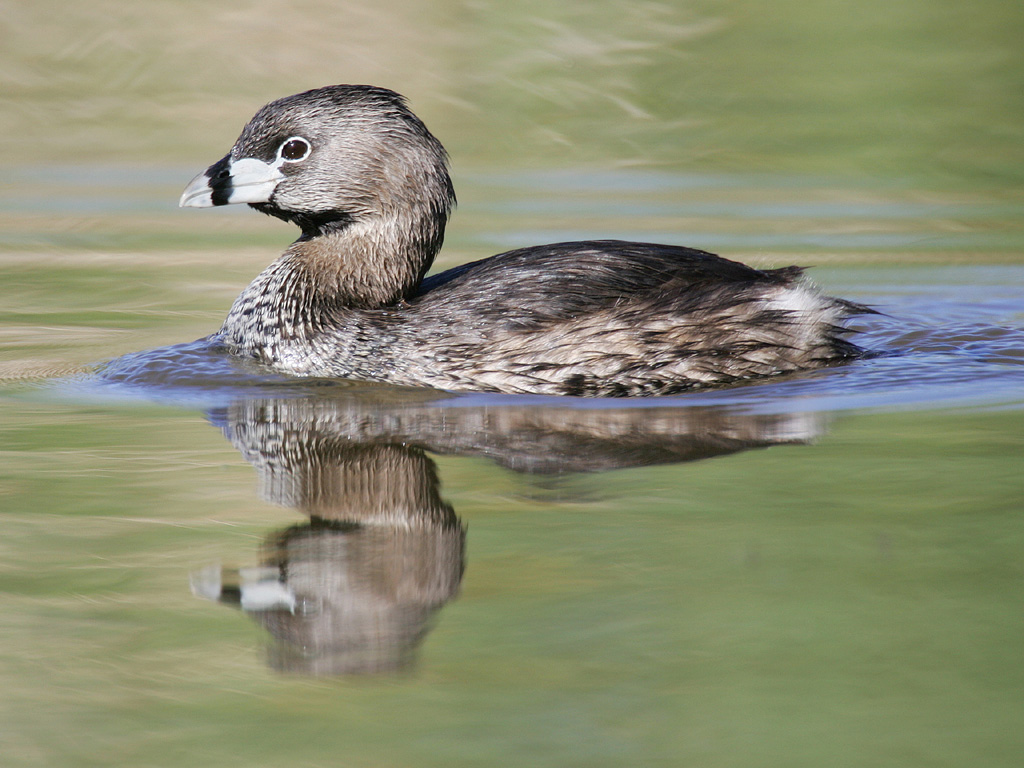
Pied-billed grebe

Order: Podicipediformes Family: Podicipedidae

Grebes are small to medium-large freshwater diving birds. They have lobed toes and are excellent swimmers and divers. However, they have their feet placed far back on the body, making them quite ungainly on land.

- Least grebe, Tachybaptus dominicus (A)
- Pied-billed grebe, Podilymbus podiceps
- Horned grebe, Podiceps auritus
- Red-necked grebe, Podiceps grisegena (VR)
- Eared grebe, Podiceps nigricollis
- Western grebe, Aechmorphorus occidentalis

== Pigeons and doves ==
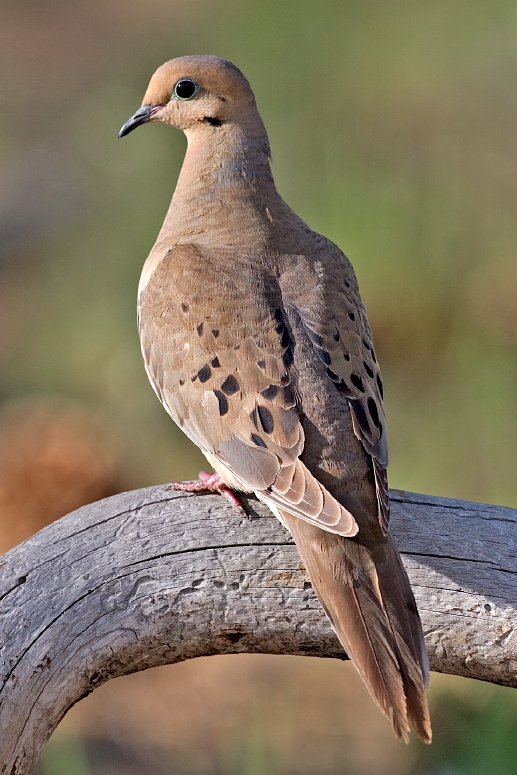
Mourning dove

Order: Columbiformes Family: Columbidae

Pigeons and doves are stout-bodied birds with short necks and short slender bills with a fleshy cere.

- Rock pigeon, Columba livia (I)
- Eurasian collared-dove, Streptopelia decaocto (I)
- Passenger pigeon, Ectopistes migratorius (E)
- Inca dove, Columbina inca
- Common ground dove, Columbina passerina
- White-winged dove, Zenaida asiatica
- Mourning dove, Zenaida macroura

== Cuckoos ==
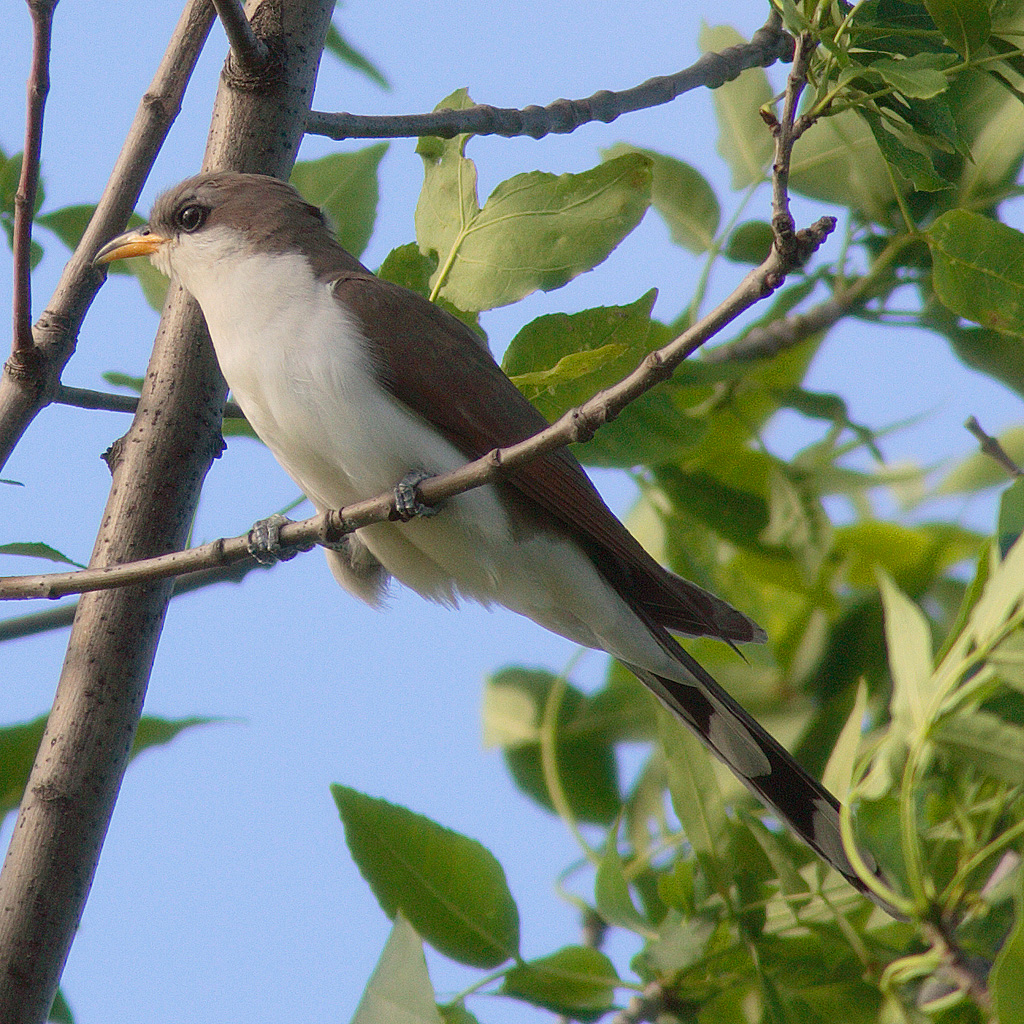
Yellow-billed cuckoo

Order: Cuculiformes Family: Cuculidae

Cuculidae includes cuckoos, roadrunners, and anis. These birds are of variable size with slender bodies, long tails, and strong legs.

- Groove-billed ani, Crotophaga sulcirostris (VR)
- Greater roadrunner, Geococcyx californianus
- Yellow-billed cuckoo, Coccyzus americanus
- Black-billed cuckoo, Coccyzus erythropthalmus

== Nightjars and allies ==
Order: Caprimulgiformes Family: Caprimulgidae

Nightjars are medium-sized nocturnal birds that usually nest on the ground. They have long wings, short legs, and very short bills. Most have small feet, of little use for walking, and long pointed wings. Their soft plumage is cryptically colored to resemble bark or leaves.

- Common nighthawk, Chordeiles minor
- Chuck-will's-widow, Antrostomus carolinensis
- Eastern whip-poor-will, Antrostomus vociferus

== Swifts ==
Order: Apodiformes Family: Apodidae

The swifts are small birds which spend the majority of their lives flying. These birds have very short legs and never settle voluntarily on the ground, perching instead only on vertical surfaces. Many swifts have very long, swept-back wings which resemble a crescent or boomerang.

- Chimney swift, Chaetura pelagica
- White-throated swift, Aeronautes saxatalis (A)

== Hummingbirds ==
Order: Apodiformes Family: Trochilidae

Hummingbirds are small birds capable of hovering in mid-air due to the rapid flapping of their wings. They are the only birds that can fly backwards.

- Mexican violetear, Colibri thalassinus (VR)
- Rivoli's hummingbird, Eugenes fulgens (A)
- Ruby-throated hummingbird, Archilochus colubris
- Black-chinned hummingbird, Archilochus alexandri (VR)
- Anna's hummingbird, Calypte anna (VR)
- Calliope hummingbird, Selasphorus calliope (A)
- Allen's hummingbird, Selasphorus sasin (A)
- Rufous hummingbird, Selasphorus rufus
- Broad-tailed hummingbird, Selasphorus platycercus (A)
- Broad-billed hummingbird, Cynanthus latirostris (A)
- Buff-bellied hummingbird, Amazilia yucatanensis (A)

== Rails, gallinules, and coots ==
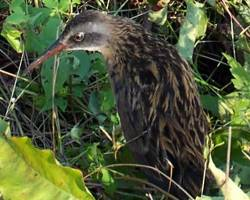
Virginia rail

Order: Gruiformes Family: Rallidae

Rallidae is a large family of small to medium-sized birds which includes the rails, crakes, coots, and gallinules. The most typical family members occupy dense vegetation in damp environments near lakes, swamps, or rivers. In general they are shy and secretive birds, making them difficult to observe. Most species have strong legs and long toes which are well adapted to soft uneven surfaces. They tend to have short, rounded wings and to be weak fliers.

- King rail, Rallus elegans
- Virginia rail, Rallus limicola
- Sora, Porzana carolina
- Common gallinule, Gallinula galeata
- American coot, Fulica americana
- Purple gallinule, Porphyrio martinicus
- Yellow rail, Coturnicops noveboracensis (VR)
- Black rail, Laterallus jamaicensis (VR)

== Limpkin ==
Order: Gruiformes Family: Aramidae

The limpkin is an odd bird that looks like a large rail, but is skeletally closer to the cranes.

- Limpkin, Aramus guarauna (A)

== Cranes ==
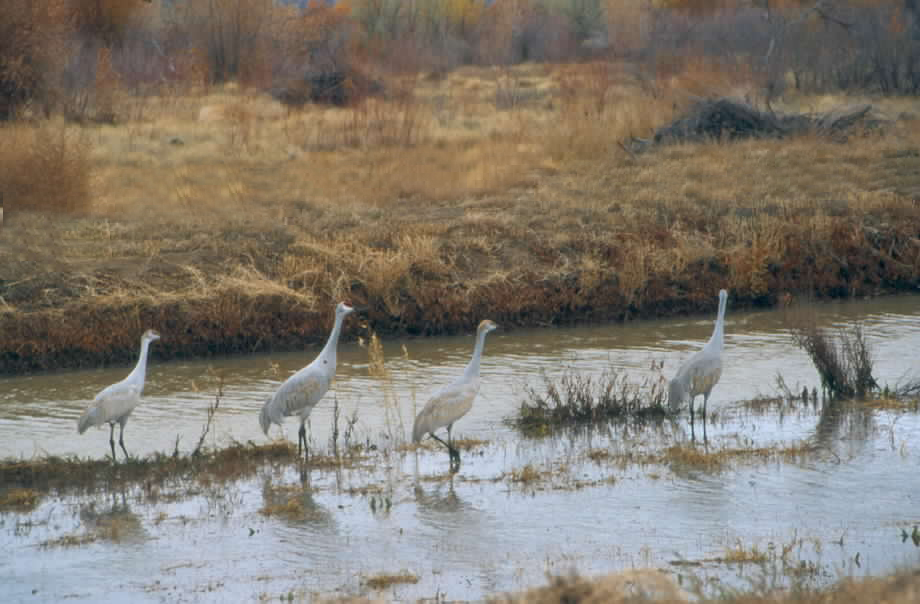
Sandhill cranes

Order: Gruiformes Family: Gruidae

Cranes are large, long-legged, and long-necked birds. Unlike the similar-looking but unrelated herons, cranes fly with necks outstretched, not pulled back. Most have elaborate and noisy courting displays or "dances".

- Sandhill crane, Antigone canadensis
- Whooping crane, Grus americana (Ex)

== Stilts and avocets ==
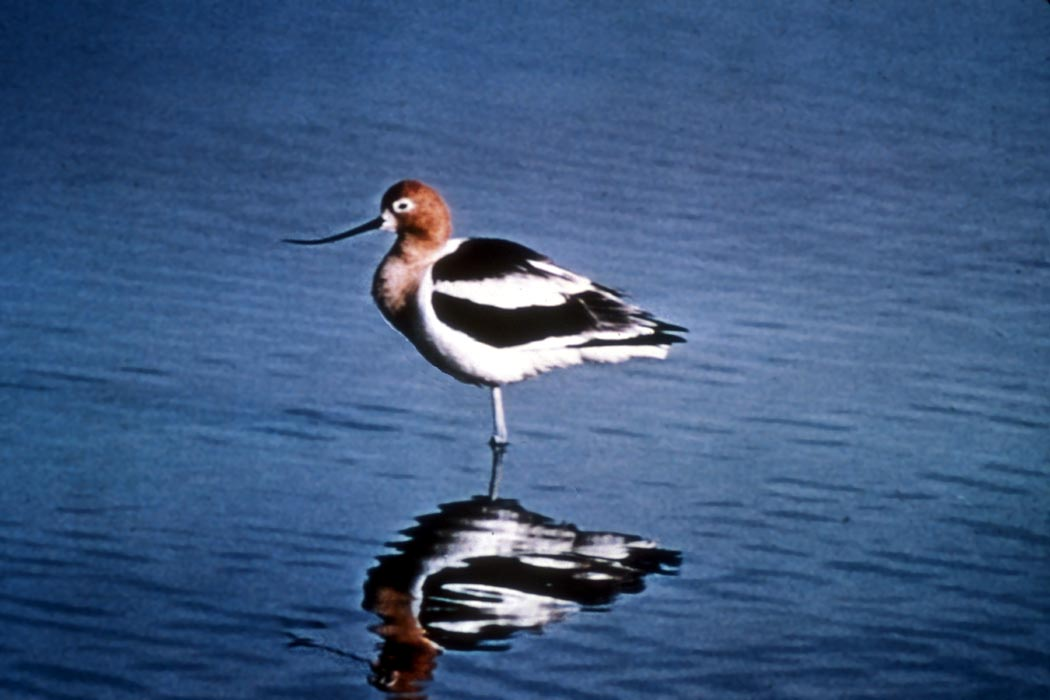
American avocet

Order: Charadriiformes Family: Recurvirostridae

Recurvirostridae is a family of large wading birds, which includes the avocets and stilts. The avocets have long legs and long up-curved bills. The stilts have extremely long legs and long, thin, straight bills.

- Black-necked stilt, Himantopus mexicanus
- American avocet, Recurvirostra americana

== Lapwings and plovers ==
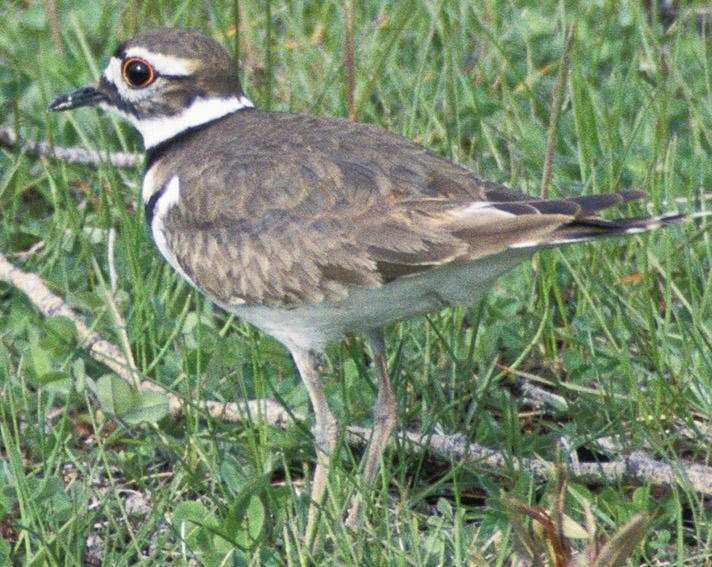
Killdeer

Order: Charadriiformes Family: Charadriidae

The family Charadriidae includes the plovers, dotterels, and lapwings. They are small to medium-sized birds with compact bodies, short thick necks, and long, usually pointed, wings. They are found in open country worldwide, mostly in habitats near water.

- Black-bellied plover, Pluvialis squatarola
- American golden-plover, Pluvialis dominica
- Killdeer, Charadrius vociferus
- Semipalmated plover, Charadrius semipalmatus
- Piping plover, Charadrius melodus
- Wilson's plover, Charadrius wilsonia (O)
- Snowy plover, Charadrius nivosus (O)
- Mountain plover, Charadrius montanus (A)

== Sandpipers and allies ==
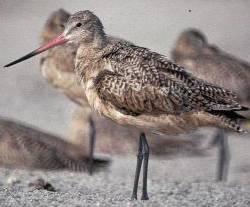
Marbled godwit

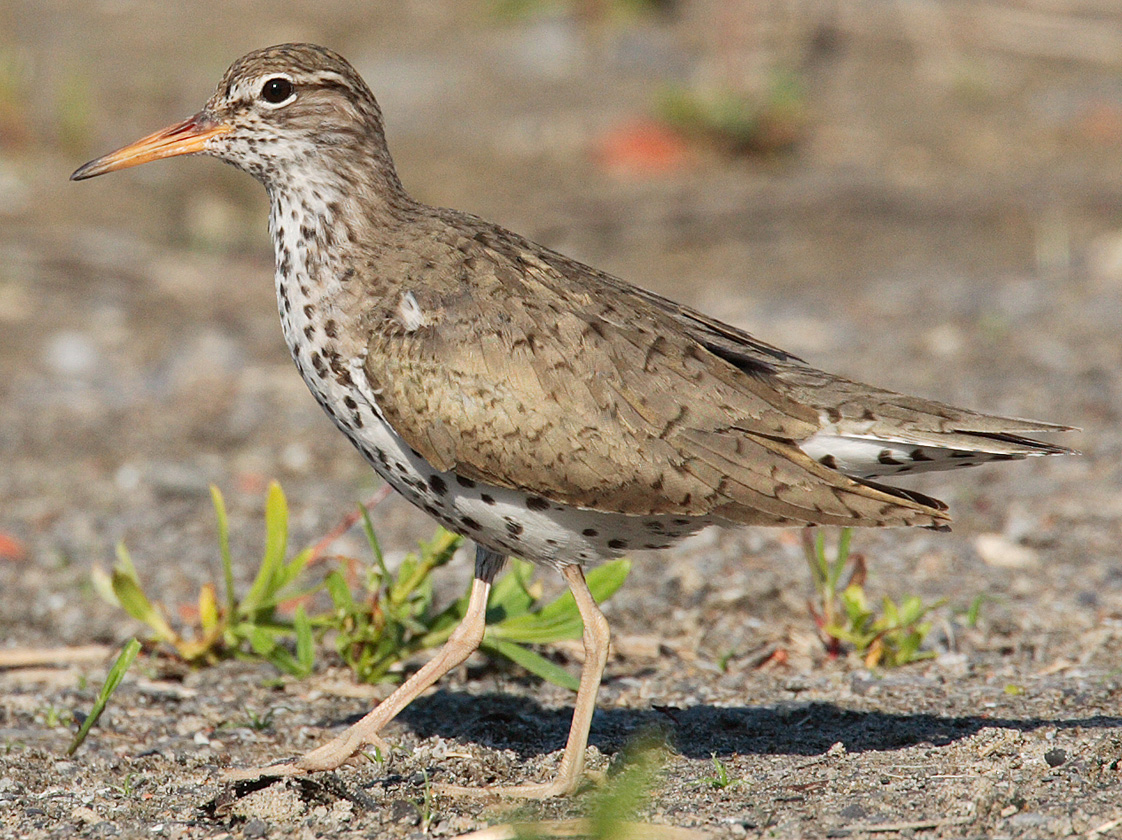
Spotted sandpiper

Order: Charadriiformes Family: Scolopacidae

Scolopacidae is a large diverse family of small to medium-sized shorebirds including the sandpipers, curlews, godwits, shanks, tattlers, woodcocks, snipes, dowitchers, and phalaropes. The majority of these species eat small invertebrates picked out of the mud or soil. Different lengths of legs and bills enable multiple species to feed in the same habitat, particularly on the coast, without direct competition for food.

- Upland sandpiper, Bartramia longicauda
- Whimbrel, Numenius phaeopus (VR)
- Eskimo curlew, Numenius borealis (Classed by the AAS as extirpated, but generally considered as possibly extinct)
- Long-billed curlew, Numenius americanus (A)
- Hudsonian godwit, Limosa haemastica
- Marbled godwit, Limosa fedoa
- Ruddy turnstone, Arenaria interpres
- Red knot, Calidris canutus (VR)
- Ruff, Calidris pugnax (VR)
- Sharp-tailed sandpiper, Calidris acuminata (A)
- Stilt sandpiper, Calidris himantopus
- Curlew sandpiper, Calidris ferruginea (A)
- Sanderling, Calidris alba
- Dunlin, Calidris alpina
- Purple sandpiper, Calidris maritima (A)
- Baird's sandpiper, Calidris bairdii
- Least sandpiper, Calidris minutilla
- White-rumped sandpiper, Calidris fuscicollis
- Buff-breasted sandpiper, Calidris subruficollis
- Pectoral sandpiper, Calidris melanotos
- Semipalmated sandpiper, Calidris pusilla
- Western sandpiper, Calidris mauri
- Short-billed dowitcher, Limnodromus griseus
- Long-billed dowitcher, Limnodromus scolopaceus
- American woodcock, Scolopax minor
- Wilson's snipe, Gallinago delicata
- Spotted sandpiper, Actitis macularius
- Solitary sandpiper, Tringa solitaria
- Lesser yellowlegs, Tringa flavipes
- Willet, Tringa semipalmata
- Greater yellowlegs, Tringa melanoleuca
- Wilson's phalarope, Phalaropus tricolor
- Red-necked phalarope, Phalaropus lobatus
- Red phalarope, Phalaropus fulicarius (VR)

== Skuas and jaegers ==
Order: Charadriiformes Family: Stercorariidae

Skuas and jaegers are in general medium to large birds, typically with gray or brown plumage, often with white markings on the wings. They have longish bills with hooked tips and webbed feet with sharp claws. They look like large dark gulls, but have a fleshy cere above the upper mandible. They are strong, acrobatic fliers.

- Pomarine jaeger, Stercorarius pomarinus (C)
- Parasitic jaeger, Stercorarius parasiticus (A)
- Long-tailed jaeger, Stercorarius longicaudus (C)

== Auks, murres, and puffins ==
Order: Charadriiformes Family: Alcidae

The family Alcidae includes auks, murres, and puffins. These are short-winged birds that live on the open sea and normally only come ashore for breeding.

- Long-billed murrelet, Brachyramphus perdix (A)

== Gulls, terns, and skimmers ==
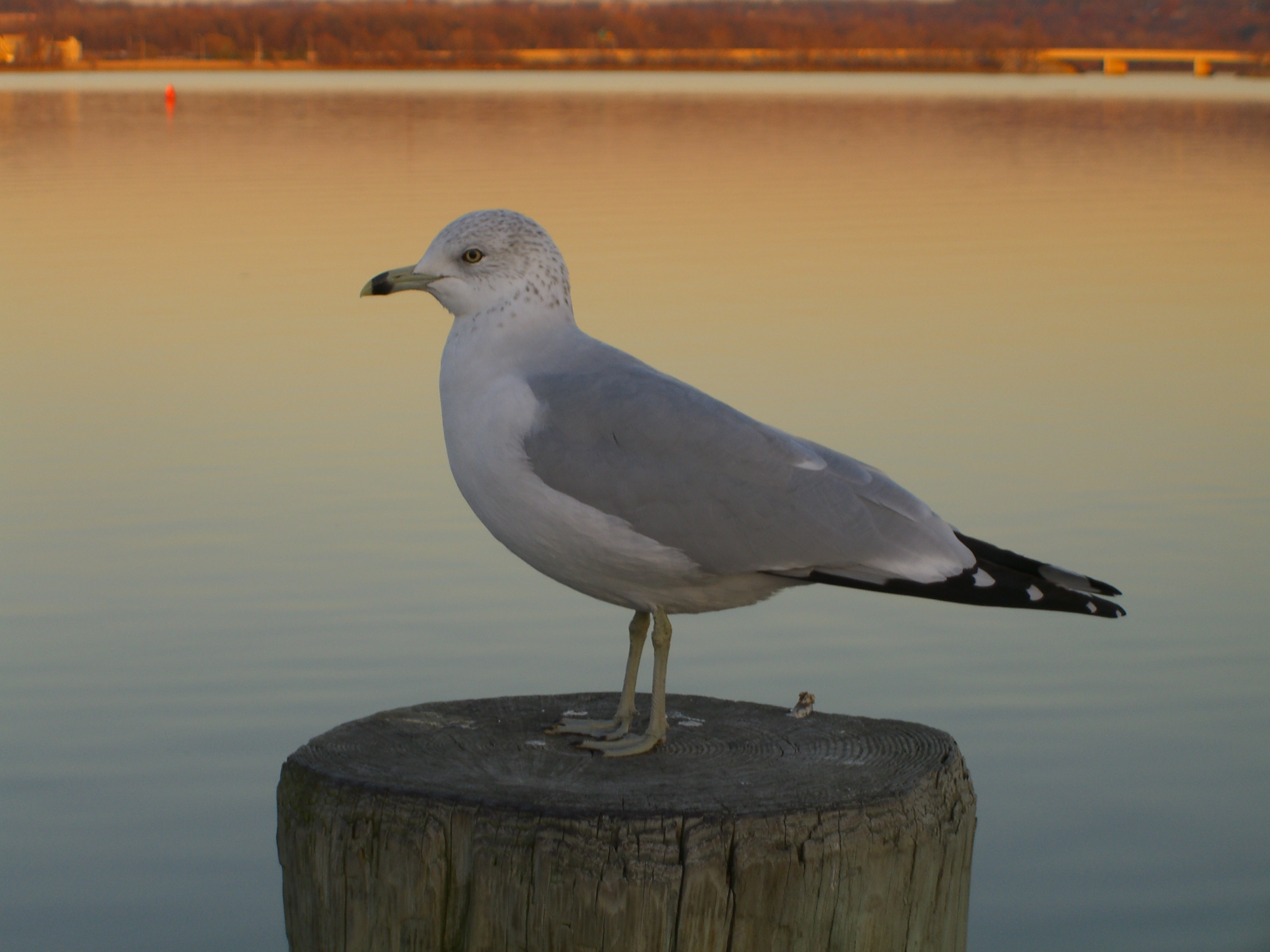
Ring-billed gull

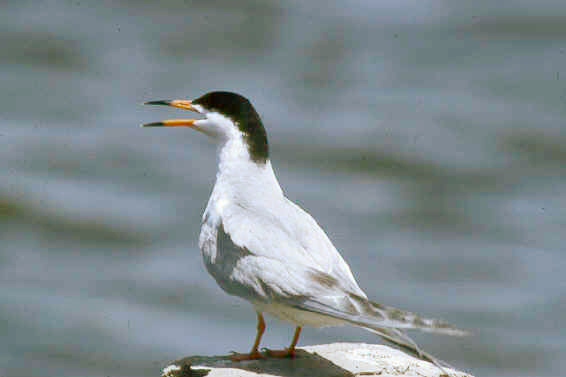
Forster's tern

Order: Charadriiformes Family: Laridae

Laridae is a family of medium to large seabirds and includes gulls, terns, kittiwakes, and skimmers. They are typically gray or white, often with black markings on the head or wings. They have stout, longish bills and webbed feet.

- Black-legged kittiwake, Rissa tridactyla (VR)
- Sabine's gull, Xema sabini
- Bonaparte's gull, Chroicocephalus philadelphia
- Black-headed gull, Chroicocephalus ridibundus (VR)
- Little gull, Hydrocoloeus minutus (VR)
- Laughing gull, Leucophaeus atricilla (VR)
- Franklin's gull, Leucophaeus pipixcan
- Short-billed gull, Larus brachyrhynchus (A)
- Ring-billed gull, Larus delawarensis
- California gull, Larus californicus (VR)
- Herring gull, Larus argentatus
- Iceland gull, Larus glaucoides (A)
- Lesser black-backed gull, Larus fuscus
- Glaucous gull, Larus hyperboreus (VR)
- Great black-backed gull, Larus marinus (A)
- Sooty tern, Onychoprion fuscata (VR)
- Bridled tern, Onychoprion anaethetus (A)
- Least tern, Sternula antillarum
- Gull-billed tern, Gelochelidon nilotica (A)
- Caspian tern, Hydroprogne caspia
- Black tern, Chlidonias niger
- Common tern, Sterna hirundo
- Forster's tern, Sterna forsteri
- Royal tern, Thalasseus maximus (VR)
- Black skimmer, Rynchops niger (VR)

== Loons ==
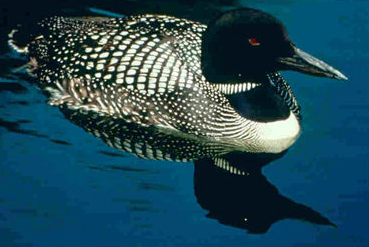
Common loon

Order: Gaviiformes Family: Gaviidae

Loons are aquatic birds the size of a large duck, to which they are unrelated. Their plumage is largely gray or black, and they have spear-shaped bills. Loons swim well and fly adequately, but are almost hopeless on land, because their legs are placed towards the rear of the body.

- Red-throated loon, Gavia stellata
- Pacific loon, Gavia pacifica
- Common loon, Gavia immer
- Yellow-billed loon, Gavia adamsii (A)

== Storks ==
Order: Ciconiiformes Family: Ciconiidae

Storks are large, heavy, long-legged, long-necked wading birds with long stout bills and wide wingspans. They lack the powder down that other wading birds such as herons, spoonbills and ibises use to clean off fish slime. Storks lack a pharynx and are mute.

- Wood stork, Mycteria americana

== Frigatebirds ==
Order: Suliformes Family: Fregatidae

Frigatebirds are large seabirds usually found over tropical oceans. They are large, black, or black and white, with long wings and deeply forked tails. The males have colored inflatable throat pouches. They do not swim or walk and cannot take off from a flat surface. Having the largest wingspan-to-body-weight ratio of any bird, they are essentially aerial, able to stay aloft for more than a week.

- Magnificent frigatebird, Fregata magnificens (VR)

== Boobies and gannets ==
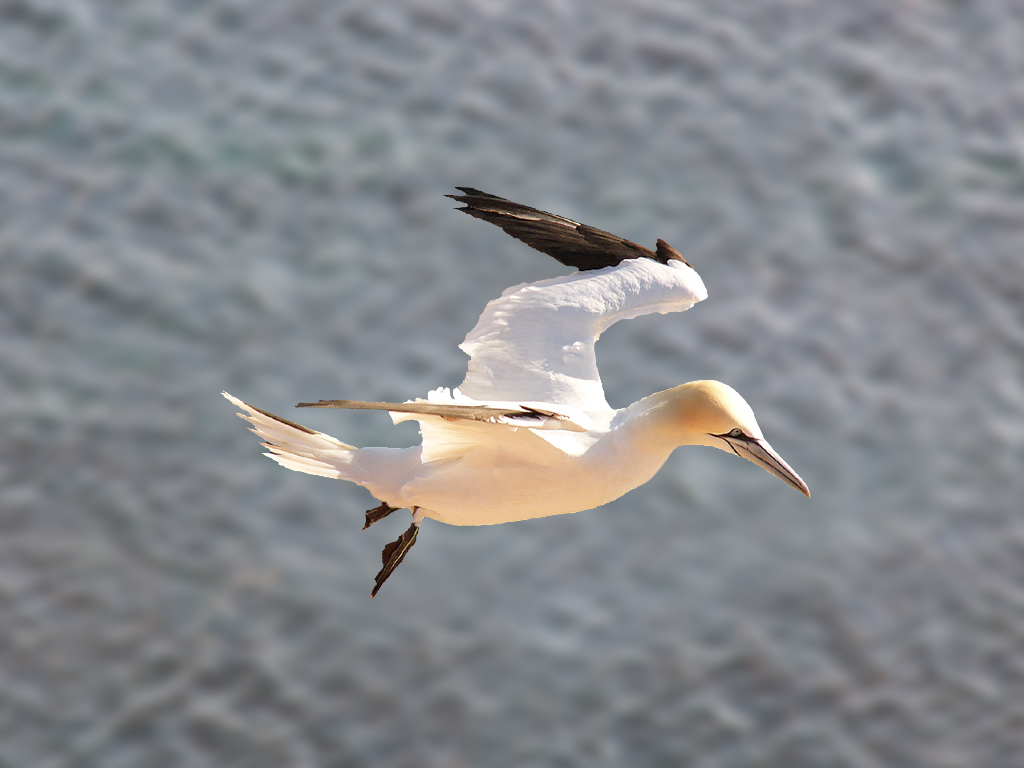
Northern gannet

Order: Suliformes Family: Sulidae

The sulids comprise the gannets and boobies. Both groups are medium-large coastal seabirds that plunge-dive for fish.

- Brown booby, Sula leucogaster (O)
- Northern gannet, Morus bassanus (A)

== Anhingas ==
Order: Suliformes Family: Anhingidae

Anhingas are cormorant-like water birds with very long necks and long, straight beaks. They are fish eaters which often swim with only their neck above the water.

- Anhinga, Anhinga anhinga

== Cormorants and shags ==
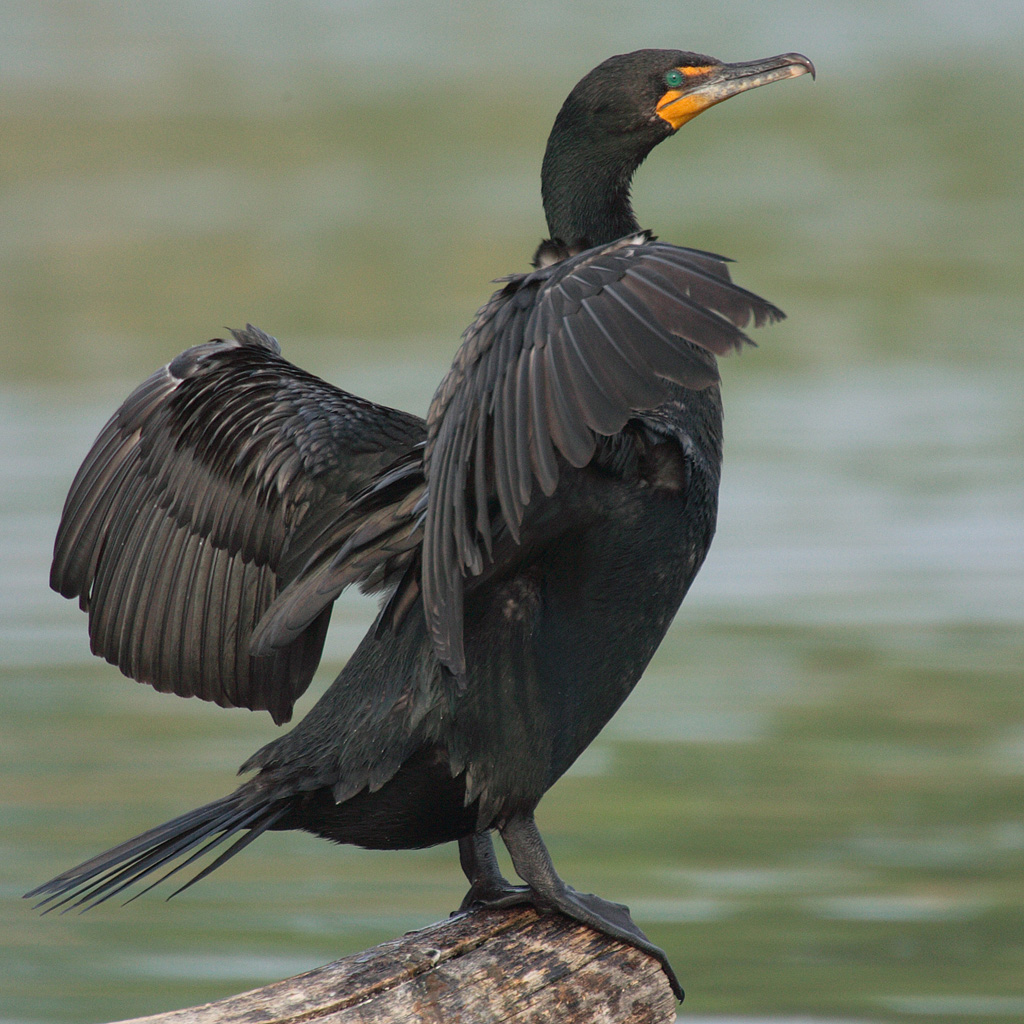
Double-crested cormorant

Order: Suliformes Family: Phalacrocoracidae

Cormorants are medium-to-large aquatic birds, usually with mainly dark plumage and areas of colored skin on the face. The bill is long, thin, and sharply hooked. Their feet are four-toed and webbed.

- Double-crested cormorant, Nannopterum auritum
- Neotropic cormorant, Nannopterum brasilianum

== Pelicans ==
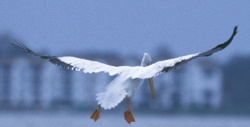
American white pelican

Order: Pelecaniformes Family: Pelecanidae

Pelicans are very large water birds with a distinctive pouch under their beak. Like other birds in the order Pelecaniformes, they have four webbed toes.

- American white pelican, Pelecanus erythrorhynchos
- Brown pelican, Pelecanus occidentalis (VR)

== Herons, egrets, and bitterns ==
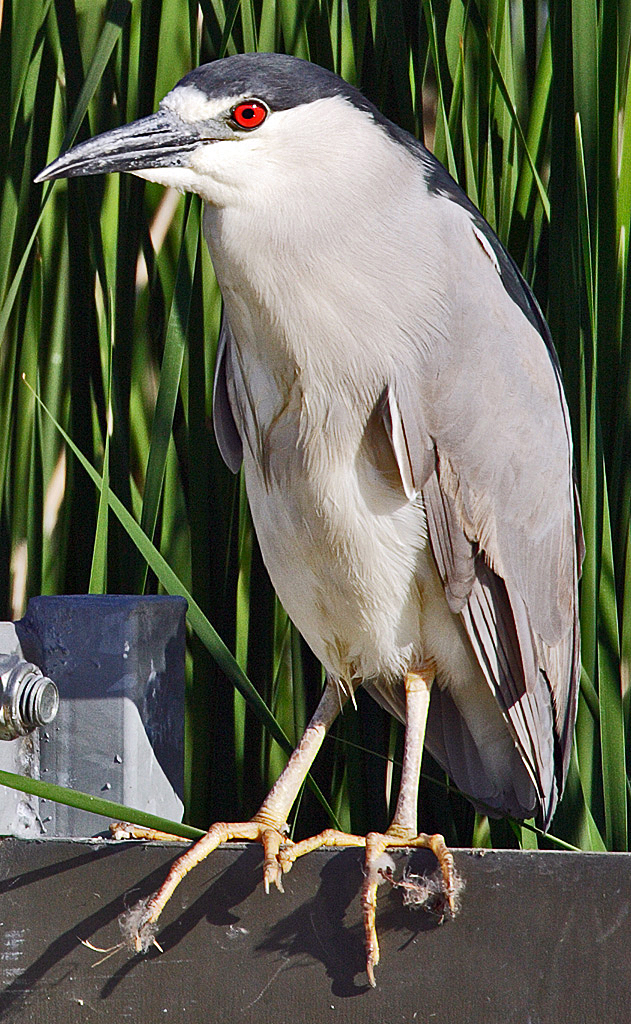
Black-crowned night-heron

Order: Pelecaniformes Family: Ardeidae

The family Ardeidae contains the herons, egrets, and bitterns. Herons and egrets are medium to large wading birds with long necks and legs. Bitterns tend to be shorter necked and more secretive. Members of Ardeidae fly with their necks retracted, unlike other long-necked birds such as storks, ibises, and spoonbills.

- American bittern, Botaurus lentiginosus
- Least bittern, Ixobrychus exilis
- Great blue heron, Ardea herodias
- Great egret, Ardea alba
- Snowy egret, Egretta thula
- Little blue heron, Egretta caerulea
- Tricolored heron, Egretta tricolor
- Cattle egret, Bubulcus ibis
- Green heron, Butorides virescens
- Black-crowned night-heron, Nycticorax nycticorax
- Yellow-crowned night-heron, Nyctanassa violacea

== Ibises and spoonbills ==
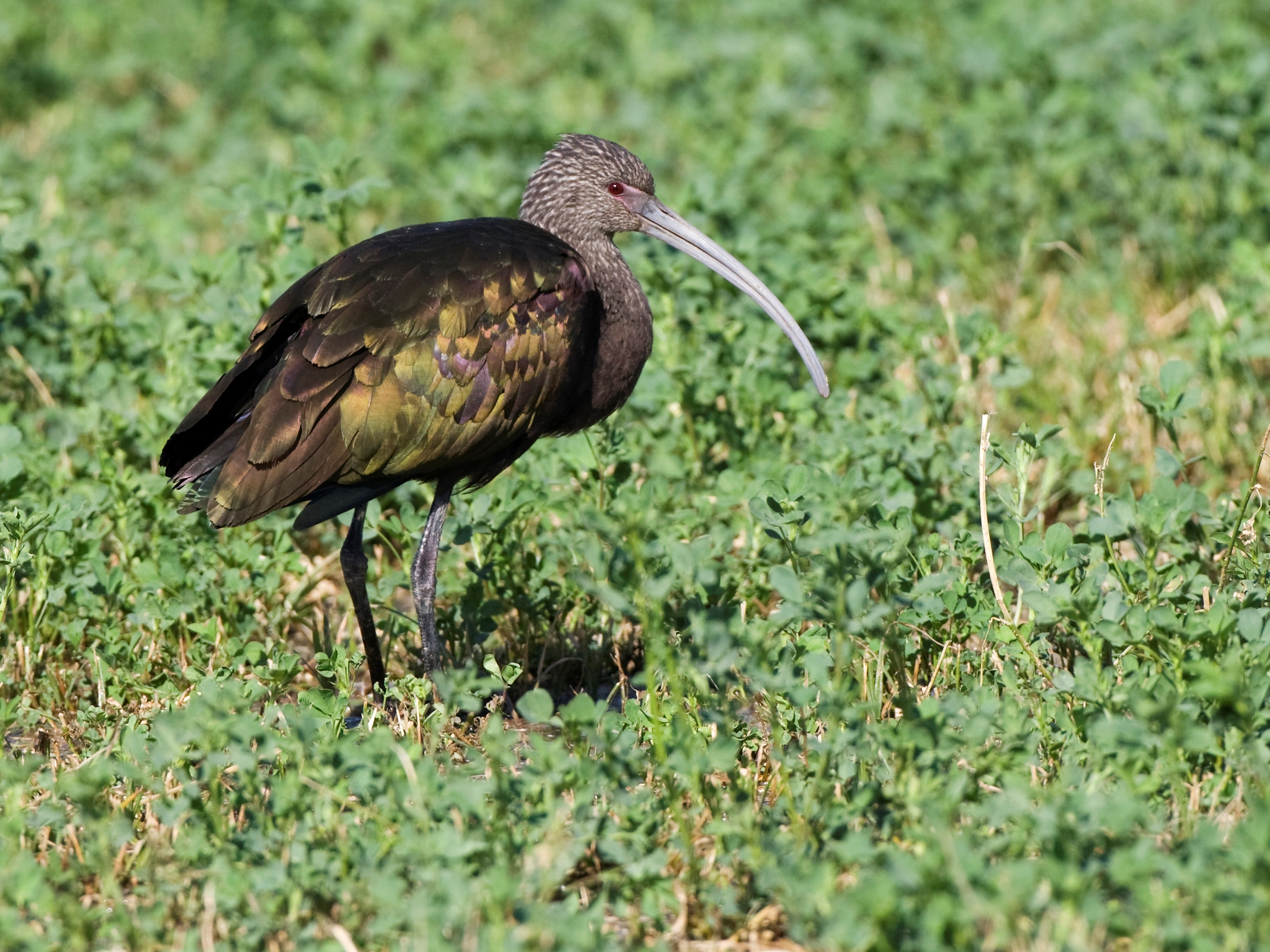
White-faced ibis

Order: Pelecaniformes Family: Threskiornithidae

The family Threskiornithidae includes the ibises and spoonbills. They have long, broad wings. Their bodies tend to be elongated, the neck more so, with rather long legs. The bill is also long, decurved in the case of the ibises, straight and distinctively flattened in the spoonbills.

- White ibis, Eudocimus albus
- Glossy ibis, Plegadis falcinellus
- White-faced ibis, Plegadis chihi
- Roseate spoonbill, Platalea ajaja (C)

== New World vultures ==
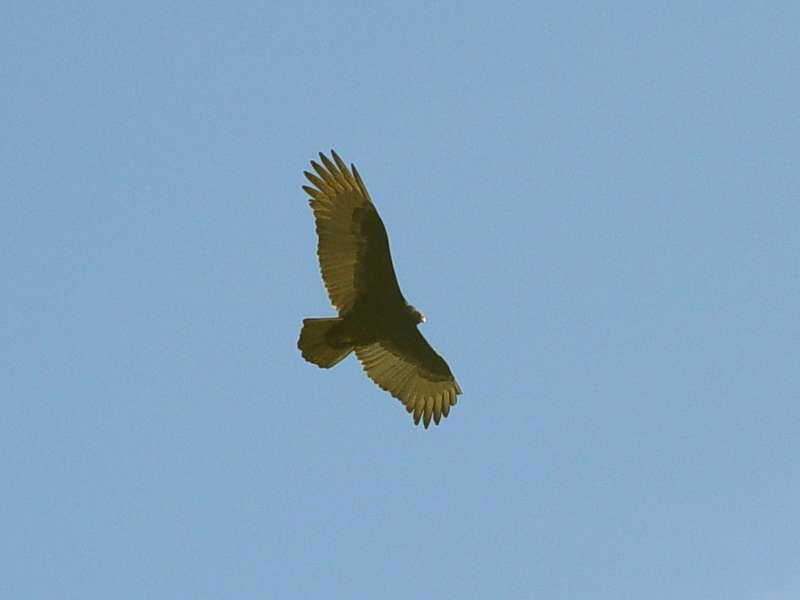
Turkey vulture

Order: Cathartiformes Family: Cathartidae

The New World vultures are not closely related to Old World vultures, but superficially resemble them because of convergent evolution. Like the Old World vultures, they are scavengers. However, unlike Old World vultures, which find carcasses by sight, New World vultures have a good sense of smell with which they locate carcasses.

- Black vulture, Coragyps atratus
- Turkey vulture, Cathartes aura

== Osprey ==
Order: Accipitriformes Family: Pandionidae

Pandionidae is a family of fish-eating birds of prey, possessing a very large, powerful hooked beak for tearing flesh from their prey, strong legs, powerful talons, and keen eyesight. The family is monotypic.

- Osprey, Pandion haliaetus

== Hawks, eagles, and kites ==
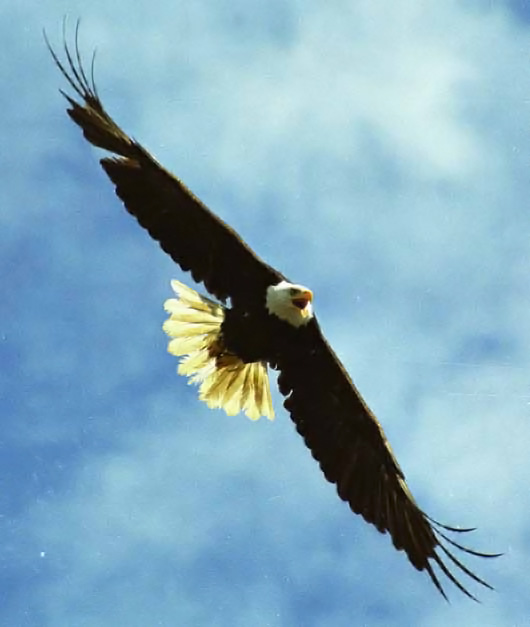
Bald eagle

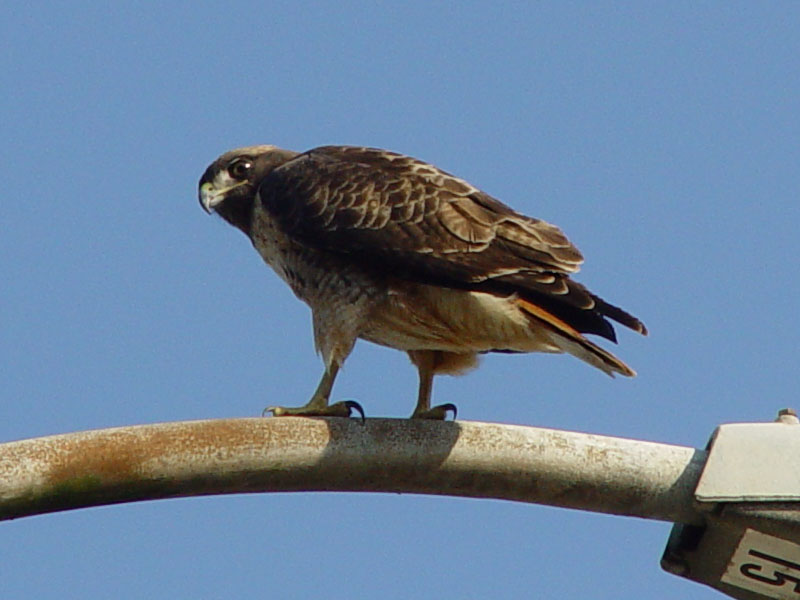
Red-tailed hawk

Order: Accipitriformes Family: Accipitridae

Accipitridae is a family of birds of prey, which includes hawks, eagles, kites, harriers, and Old World vultures. These birds have very large powerful hooked beaks for tearing flesh from their prey, strong legs, powerful talons, and keen eyesight.

- White-tailed kite, Elanus leucurus (VR)
- Swallow-tailed kite, Elanoides forficatus (VR)
- Golden eagle, Aquila chrysaetos
- Northern harrier, Circus hudsonius
- Sharp-shinned hawk, Accipiter striatus
- Cooper's hawk, Accipiter cooperii
- American goshawk, Accipiter atricapillus (VR)
- Mississippi kite, Ictinia mississippiensis
- Bald eagle, Haliaeetus leucocephalus
- Red-shouldered hawk, Buteo lineatus
- Broad-winged hawk, Buteo platypterus
- Swainson's hawk, Buteo swainsoni
- Red-tailed hawk, Buteo jamaicensis
- Rough-legged hawk, Buteo lagopus (VR)
- Ferruginous hawk, Buteo regalis (VR)

== Barn-owls ==
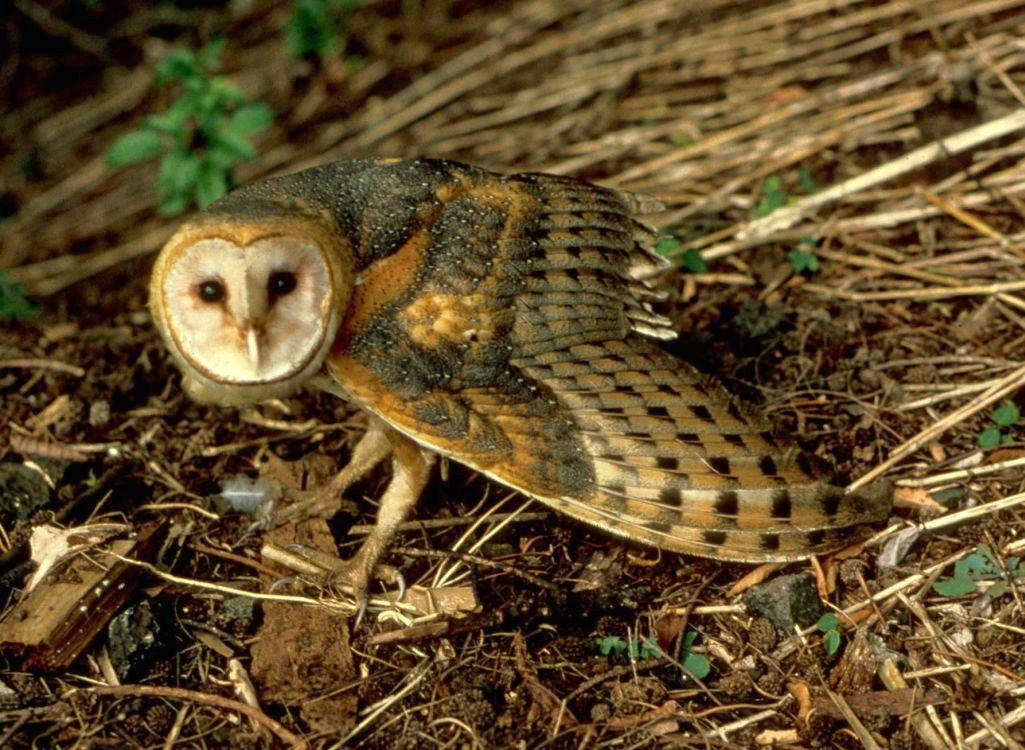
Barn owl

Order: Strigiformes Family: Tytonidae

Barn-owls are medium to large owls with large heads and characteristic heart-shaped faces. They have long strong legs with powerful talons.

- Barn owl, Tyto alba

== Owls ==
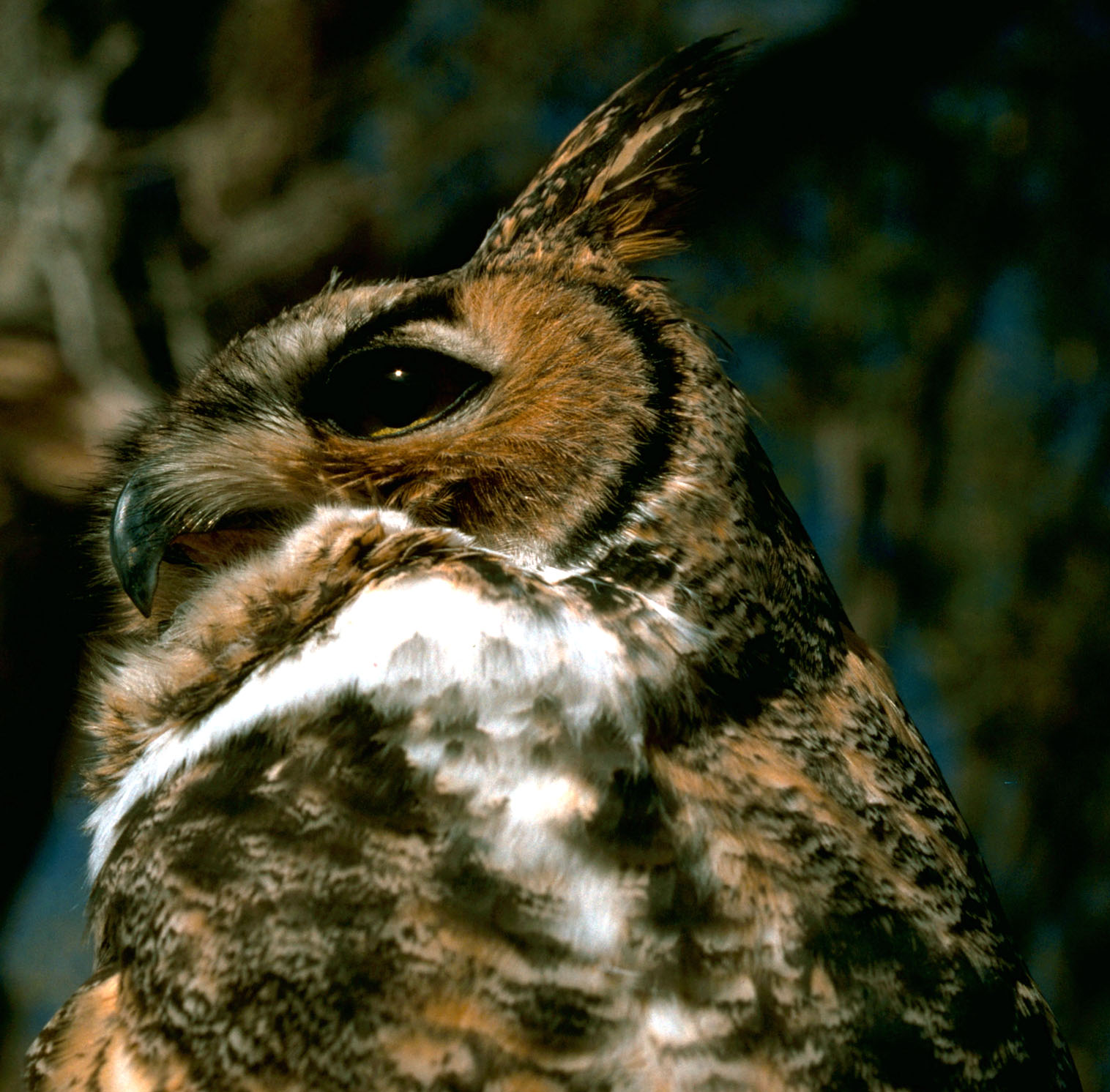
Great horned owl

Order: Strigiformes Family: Strigidae

The typical owls are small to large solitary nocturnal birds of prey. They have large forward-facing eyes and ears, a hawk-like beak, and a conspicuous circle of feathers around each eye called a facial disk.

- Eastern screech-owl, Megascops asio
- Great horned owl, Bubo virginianus
- Snowy owl, Bubo scandiacus (VR)
- Burrowing owl, Athene cunicularia
- Barred owl, Strix varia
- Long-eared owl, Asio otus (VR)
- Short-eared owl, Asio flammeus
- Northern saw-whet owl, Aegolius acadicus (VR)

== Kingfishers ==
Order: Coraciiformes Family: Alcedinidae

Kingfishers are medium-sized birds with large heads, long, pointed bills, short legs, and stubby tails.

- Belted kingfisher, Megaceryle alcyon

== Woodpeckers ==
Order: Piciformes Family: Picidae

Woodpeckers are small to medium-sized birds with chisel-like beaks, short legs, stiff tails, and long tongues used for capturing insects. Some species have feet with two toes pointing forward and two backward, while several species have only three toes. Many woodpeckers have the habit of tapping noisily on tree trunks with their beaks.

- Lewis's woodpecker, Melanerpes lewis (A)
- Red-headed woodpecker, Melanerpes erythrocephalus
- Red-bellied woodpecker, Melanerpes carolinus
- Yellow-bellied sapsucker, Sphyrapicus varius
- Downy woodpecker, Dryobates pubescens
- Red-cockaded woodpecker, Dryobates borealis
- Hairy woodpecker, Dryobates villosus
- Northern flicker, Colaptes auratus
- Pileated woodpecker, Dryocopus pileatus
- Ivory-billed woodpecker, Campephilus principalis ("Recent status unclear" per the AAS. See the species' page for the controversy surrounding it.)

== Falcons and caracaras ==
Order: Falconiformes Family: Falconidae

Falconidae is a family of diurnal birds of prey, notably the falcons, and caracaras. They differ from hawks, eagles and kites in that they kill with their beaks instead of their talons.

- Crested caracara, Caracara plancus (A)
- American kestrel, Falco sparverius
- Merlin, Falco columbarius
- Peregrine falcon, Falco peregrinus
- Prairie falcon, Falco mexicanus

== New World and African parrots ==
Order: Psittaciformes Family: Psittacidae

Parrots are small to large birds with a characteristic curved beak. Their upper mandibles have slight mobility in the joint with the skull and they have a generally erect stance. All parrots are zygodactyl, having the four toes on each foot placed two at the front and two to the back. Most of the more than 150 species in this family are found in the New World.

- Carolina parakeet, Conuropsis carolinensis (E)

== Tyrant flycatchers ==
Order: Passeriformes Family: Tyrannidae

Tyrant flycatchers are Passerine birds which occur throughout North and South America. They superficially resemble the Old World flycatchers, but are more robust and have stronger bills. They do not have the sophisticated vocal capabilities of the songbirds. Most, but not all, are rather plain. As the name implies, most are insectivorous.

- Ash-throated flycatcher, Myiarchus cinerascens (A)
- Great crested flycatcher, Myiarchus crinitus
- Great kiskadee, Pitangus sulphuratus (A)
- Tropical kingbird, Tyrannus melancholicus (A)
- Couch's kingbird, Tyrannus couchii (A)
- Cassin's kingbird, Tyrannus vociferans (A)
- Western kingbird, Tyrannus verticalis
- Eastern kingbird, Tyrannus tyrannus
- Gray kingbird, Tyrannus dominicensis (A)
- Scissor-tailed flycatcher, Tyrannus forficatus
- Fork-tailed flycatcher, Tyrannus savana (A)
- Olive-sided flycatcher, Contopus cooperi
- Eastern wood-pewee, Contopus virens
- Yellow-bellied flycatcher, Empidonax flaviventris
- Acadian flycatcher, Empidonax virescens
- Alder flycatcher, Empidonax alnorum
- Willow flycatcher, Empidonax traillii
- Least flycatcher, Empidonax minimus
- Eastern phoebe, Sayornis phoebe
- Say's phoebe, Sayornis saya
- Vermilion flycatcher, Pyrocephalus rubinus (VR)

== Vireos, shrike-babblers, and erpornis ==
Order: Passeriformes Family: Vireonidae

The vireos are a group of small to medium-sized passerine birds. They are typically greenish in color and resemble wood warblers apart from their heavier bills.

- White-eyed vireo, Vireo griseus
- Bell's vireo, Vireo bellii
- Yellow-throated vireo, Vireo flavifrons
- Blue-headed vireo, Vireo solitarius
- Philadelphia vireo, Vireo philadelphicus
- Warbling vireo, Vireo gilvus
- Red-eyed vireo, Vireo olivaceus

== Shrikes ==
Order: Passeriformes Family: Laniidae

Shrikes are passerine birds known for their habit of catching other birds and small animals and impaling the uneaten portions of their bodies on thorns. A shrike's beak is hooked, like that of a typical bird of prey.

- Loggerhead shrike, Lanius ludovicianus
- Northern shrike, Lanius borealis (VR)

== Crows, jays, and magpies ==
Order: Passeriformes Family: Corvidae

The family Corvidae includes crows, ravens, jays, choughs, magpies, treepies, nutcrackers, and ground jays. Corvids are above average in size among the Passeriformes, and some of the larger species show high levels of intelligence.

- Blue jay, Cyanocitta cristata
- Clark's nutcracker, Nucifraga columbiana (A)
- American crow, Corvus brachyrhynchos
- Fish crow, Corvus ossifragus
- Chihuahuan raven, Corvus cryptoleucus (A)

== Tits, chickadees and titmice ==
Order: Passeriformes Family: Paridae

The Paridae are mainly small stocky woodland species with short stout bills. Some have crests. They are adaptable birds, with a mixed diet including seeds and insects.

- Carolina chickadee, Poecile carolinensis
- Tufted titmouse, Baeolophus bicolor

== Larks ==
Order: Passeriformes Family: Alaudidae

Larks are small terrestrial birds with often extravagant songs and display flights. Most larks are fairly dull in appearance. Their food is insects and seeds.

- Horned lark, Eremophila alpestris

== Swallows ==
Order: Passeriformes Family: Hirundinidae

The family Hirundinidae is a group of passerines characterized by their adaptation to aerial feeding. These adaptations include a slender streamlined body, long pointed wings, and short bills with a wide gape. The feet are adapted to perching rather than walking, and the front toes are partially joined at the base.

- Bank swallow, Riparia riparia
- Tree swallow, Tachycineta bicolor
- Northern rough-winged swallow, Stelgidopteryx serripennis
- Purple martin, Progne subis
- Barn swallow, Hirundo rustica
- Cliff swallow, Petrochelidon pyrrhonota
- Cave swallow, Petrochelidon fulva (A)

== Kinglets ==
Order: Passeriformes Family: Regulidae

The kinglets are a small family of birds which resemble the titmice. They are very small insectivorous birds. The adults have colored crowns, giving rise to their name.

- Ruby-crowned kinglet, Corthylio calendula
- Golden-crowned kinglet, Regulus satrapa

== Waxwings ==
Order: Passeriformes Family: Bombycillidae

The waxwings are a group of birds with soft silky plumage and unique red tips to some of the wing feathers. In the Bohemian and cedar waxwings, these tips look like sealing wax and give the group its name. These are arboreal birds of northern forests. They live on insects in summer and berries in winter.

- Bohemian waxwing, Bombycilla garrulus (VR)
- Cedar waxwing, Bombycilla cedrorum

== Nuthatches ==
Order: Passeriformes Family: Sittidae

Nuthatches are small woodland birds. They have the unusual ability to climb down trees head first, unlike other birds which can only go upwards. Nuthatches have big heads, short tails, and powerful bills and feet.

- Red-breasted nuthatch, Sitta canadensis
- White-breasted nuthatch, Sitta carolinensis
- Brown-headed nuthatch, Sitta pusilla (Ex)

== Treecreepers ==
Order: Passeriformes Family: Certhiidae

Treecreepers are small woodland birds, brown above and white below. They have thin pointed down-curved bills, which they use to extricate insects from bark. They have stiff tail feathers, like woodpeckers, which they use to support themselves on vertical trees.

- Brown creeper, Certhia americana

== Gnatcatchers ==
Order: Passeriformes Family: Polioptilidae

These dainty birds resemble Old World warblers in their structure and habits, moving restlessly through the foliage seeking insects. The gnatcatchers are mainly soft bluish gray in color and have the typical insectivore's long sharp bill. Many species have distinctive black head patterns (especially males) and long, regularly cocked, black-and-white tails.

- Blue-gray gnatcatcher, Polioptila caerulea

== Wrens ==
Order: Passeriformes Family: Troglodytidae

Wrens are small and inconspicuous birds, except for their loud songs. They have short wings and thin down-turned bills. Several species often hold their tails upright. All are insectivorous.

- Rock wren, Salpinctes obsoletus (C)
- House wren, Troglodytes aedon
- Winter wren, Troglodytes hiemalis
- Sedge wren, Cistothorus platensis
- Marsh wren, Cistothorus palustris
- Carolina wren, Thryothorus ludovicianus
- Bewick's wren, Thryomanes bewickii

== Mockingbirds and thrashers ==
Order: Passeriformes Family: Mimidae

The mimids are a family of passerine birds that includes thrashers, mockingbirds, tremblers, and the New World catbirds. These birds are notable for their vocalization, especially their remarkable ability to mimic a wide variety of birds and other sounds heard outdoors. The species tend towards dull grays and browns in their appearance.

- Gray catbird, Dumetella carolinensis
- Brown thrasher, Toxostoma rufum
- Sage thrasher, Oreoscoptes montanus (A)
- Northern mockingbird, Mimus polyglottos

== Starlings ==
Order: Passeriformes Family: Sturnidae

Starlings are small to medium-sized passerine birds with strong feet. Their flight is strong and direct and they are very gregarious. Their preferred habitat is fairly open country, and they eat insects and fruit. Plumage is typically dark with a metallic sheen.

- European starling, Sturnus vulgaris (I)

== Thrushes and allies ==
Order: Passeriformes Family: Turdidae

The thrushes are a group of passerine birds that occur mainly but not exclusively in the Old World. They are plump, soft plumaged, small to medium-sized insectivores or sometimes omnivores, often feeding on the ground. Many have attractive songs.

- Eastern bluebird, Sialia sialis
- Mountain bluebird, Sialia currucoides (A)
- Townsend's solitaire, Myadestes townsendi (VR)
- Veery, Catharus fuscescens
- Gray-cheeked thrush, Catharus minimus
- Swainson's thrush, Catharus ustulatus
- Hermit thrush, Catharus guttatus
- Wood thrush, Hylocichla mustelina
- American robin, Turdus migratorius
- Varied thrush, Ixoreus naevius (A)

== Old World flycatchers ==
Order: Passeriformes Family: Muscicapidae

This a large family of small passerine birds restricted to the Old World. Its species only occur in North America as vagrants. The appearance of these birds is highly varied, but they mostly have weak songs and harsh calls.

- Northern wheatear, Oenanthe oenanthe (A)

== Old World sparrows ==
Order: Passeriformes Family: Passeridae

Old World sparrows are small passerine birds. In general, sparrows tend to be small plump brownish or grayish birds with short tails and short powerful beaks. Sparrows are seed eaters, but they also consume small insects.

- House sparrow, Passer domesticus (I)
- Eurasian tree sparrow, Passer montanus (I) (A)

== Wagtails and pipits ==
Order: Passeriformes Family: Motacillidae

Motacillidae is a family of small passerine birds with medium to long tails. They include the wagtails, longclaws, and pipits. They are slender ground-feeding insectivores of open country.

- American pipit, Anthus rubescens
- Sprague's pipit, Anthus spragueii

== Finches, euphonias, and allies ==
Order: Passeriformes Family: Fringillidae

Finches are seed-eating passerine birds that are small to moderately large and have strong beaks, usually conical and in some species very large. All have twelve tail feathers and nine primaries. These birds have a bouncing flight with alternating bouts of flapping and gliding on closed wings, and most sing well.

- Brambling, Fringilla montifringilla (A)
- Evening grosbeak, Coccothraustes vespertinus (VR)
- Pine grosbeak, Pinicola enucleator (A)
- Gray-crowned rosy-finch, Leucosticte tephrocotis (A)
- House finch, Haemorhous mexicanus (native to the southwestern western U.S.; introduced in the east)
- Purple finch, Haemorhous purpureus
- Common redpoll, Acanthis flammea (VR)
- Red crossbill, Loxia curvirostra
- White-winged crossbill, Loxia leucoptera (VR)
- Pine siskin, Spinus pinus
- Lesser goldfinch, Spinus psaltria (A)
- American goldfinch, Spinus tristis

== Longspurs and snow buntings ==
Order: Passeriformes Family: Calcariidae

The Calcariidae are a group of passerine birds that were traditionally grouped with the New World sparrows, but differ in a number of respects and are usually found in open grassy areas.

- Lapland longspur, Calcarius lapponicus
- Chestnut-collared longspur, Calcarius ornatus (VR)
- Smith's longspur, Calcarius pictus
- Thick-billed longspur, Rhynchophanes mccownii (A)
- Snow bunting, Plectrophenax nivalis (VR)

== New World sparrows ==
Order: Passeriformes Family: Passerellidae

Until 2017, these species were considered part of the family Emberizidae. Most of the species are known as sparrows, but these birds are not closely related to the Old World sparrows which are in the family Passeridae. Many of these have distinctive head patterns.

- Cassin's sparrow, Peucaea cassinii (A)
- Bachman's sparrow, Peucaea aestivalis (C)
- Grasshopper sparrow, Ammodramus savannarum
- Lark sparrow, Chondestes grammacus
- Lark bunting, Calamospiza melanocorys (O)
- Chipping sparrow, Spizella passerina
- Clay-colored sparrow, Spizella pallida
- Field sparrow, Spizella pusilla
- Brewer's sparrow, Spizella breweri (A)
- Fox sparrow, Passerella iliaca
- American tree sparrow, Spizelloides arborea
- Dark-eyed junco, Junco hyemalis
- White-crowned sparrow, Zonotrichia leucophrys
- Harris's sparrow, Zonotrichia querula
- White-throated sparrow, Zonotrichia albicollis
- Vesper sparrow, Pooecetes gramineus
- LeConte's sparrow, Ammospiza leconteii
- Nelson's sparrow, Ammospiza nelsoni
- Henslow's sparrow, Centronyx henslowii
- Savannah sparrow, Passerculus sandwichensis
- Song sparrow, Melospiza melodia
- Lincoln's sparrow, Melospiza lincolnii
- Swamp sparrow, Melospiza georgiana
- Rufous-crowned sparrow, Aimophila ruficeps
- Green-tailed towhee, Pipilo chlorurus (A)
- Spotted towhee, Pipilo maculatus
- Eastern towhee, Pipilo erythrophthalmus

== Yellow-breasted chat ==
Order: Passeriformes Family: Icteriidae

This species was historically placed in the wood-warblers (Parulidae) but nonetheless most authorities were unsure if it belonged there. It was placed in its own family in 2017.

- Yellow-breasted chat, Icteria virens

== Troupials and allies ==
Order: Passeriformes Family: Icteridae

The icterids are a group of small to medium-sized, often colorful passerine birds restricted to the New World and include the grackles, New World blackbirds, and New World orioles. Most species have black as a predominant plumage color, often enlivened by yellow, orange, or red.

- Bobolink, Dolichonyx oryzivorus
- Red-winged blackbird, Agelaius phoeniceus
- Eastern meadowlark, Sturnella magna
- Western meadowlark, Sturnella neglecta
- Yellow-headed blackbird, Xanthocephalus xanthocephalus
- Rusty blackbird, Euphagus carolinus
- Brewer's blackbird, Euphagus cyanocephalus
- Common grackle, Quiscalus quiscula
- Great-tailed grackle, Quiscalus mexicanus
- Brown-headed cowbird, Molothrus ater
- Orchard oriole, Icterus spurius
- Bullock's oriole, Icterus bullockii (VR)
- Baltimore oriole, Icterus galbula
- Scott's oriole, Icterus parisorum (A)

== New World warblers ==
Order: Passeriformes Family: Parulidae

The wood warblers are a group of small often colorful passerine birds restricted to the New World. Most are arboreal, but some are more terrestrial. Most members of this family are insectivores.

- Ovenbird, Seiurus aurocapilla
- Worm-eating warbler, Helmitheros vermivorum
- Louisiana waterthrush, Parkesia motacilla
- Northern waterthrush, Parkesia noveboracensis
- Bachman's warbler, Vermivora bachmanii (E)
- Golden-winged warbler, Vermivora chrysoptera
- Blue-winged warbler, Vermivora cyanoptera
- Black-and-white warbler, Mniotilta varia
- Prothonotary warbler, Protonotaria citrea
- Swainson's warbler, Limnothlypis swainsonii
- Tennessee warbler, Leiothlypis peregrina
- Orange-crowned warbler, Leiothlypis celata
- Nashville warbler, Leiothlypis ruficapilla
- Connecticut warbler, Oporornis agilis (VR)
- Mourning warbler, Geothlypis philadelphia
- Kentucky warbler, Geothlypis formosa
- Common yellowthroat, Geothlypis trichas
- Hooded warbler, Setophaga citrina
- American redstart, Setophaga ruticilla
- Cape May warbler, Setophaga tigrina
- Cerulean warbler, Setophaga cerulea
- Northern parula, Setophaga americana
- Magnolia warbler, Setophaga magnolia
- Bay-breasted warbler, Setophaga castanea
- Blackburnian warbler, Setophaga fusca
- Yellow warbler, Setophaga petechia
- Chestnut-sided warbler, Setophaga pensylvanica
- Blackpoll warbler, Setophaga striata
- Black-throated blue warbler, Setophaga caerulescens (VR)
- Palm warbler, Setophaga palmarum
- Pine warbler, Setophaga pinus
- Yellow-rumped warbler, Setophaga coronata
- Yellow-throated warbler, Setophaga dominica
- Prairie warbler, Setophaga discolor
- Black-throated gray warbler, Setophaga nigrescens (A)
- Black-throated green warbler, Setophaga virens
- Canada warbler, Cardellina canadensis
- Wilson's warbler, Cardellina pusilla

== Cardinals and allies ==
Order: Passeriformes Family: Cardinalidae

The Cardinalidae are a family of robust, seed-eating birds with strong bills. They are typically associated with open woodland. The sexes usually have distinct plumage.

- Summer tanager, Piranga rubra
- Scarlet tanager, Piranga olivacea
- Western tanager, Piranga ludoviciana (VR)
- Northern cardinal, Cardinalis cardinalis
- Rose-breasted grosbeak, Pheucticus ludovicianus
- Black-headed grosbeak, Pheucticus melanocephalus (VR)
- Blue grosbeak, Passerina caerulea
- Lazuli bunting, Passerina amoena
- Indigo bunting, Passerina cyanea
- Painted bunting, Passerina ciris
- Dickcissel, Spiza americana

== See also ==
- List of birds
- Lists of birds by region
- List of birds of North America
