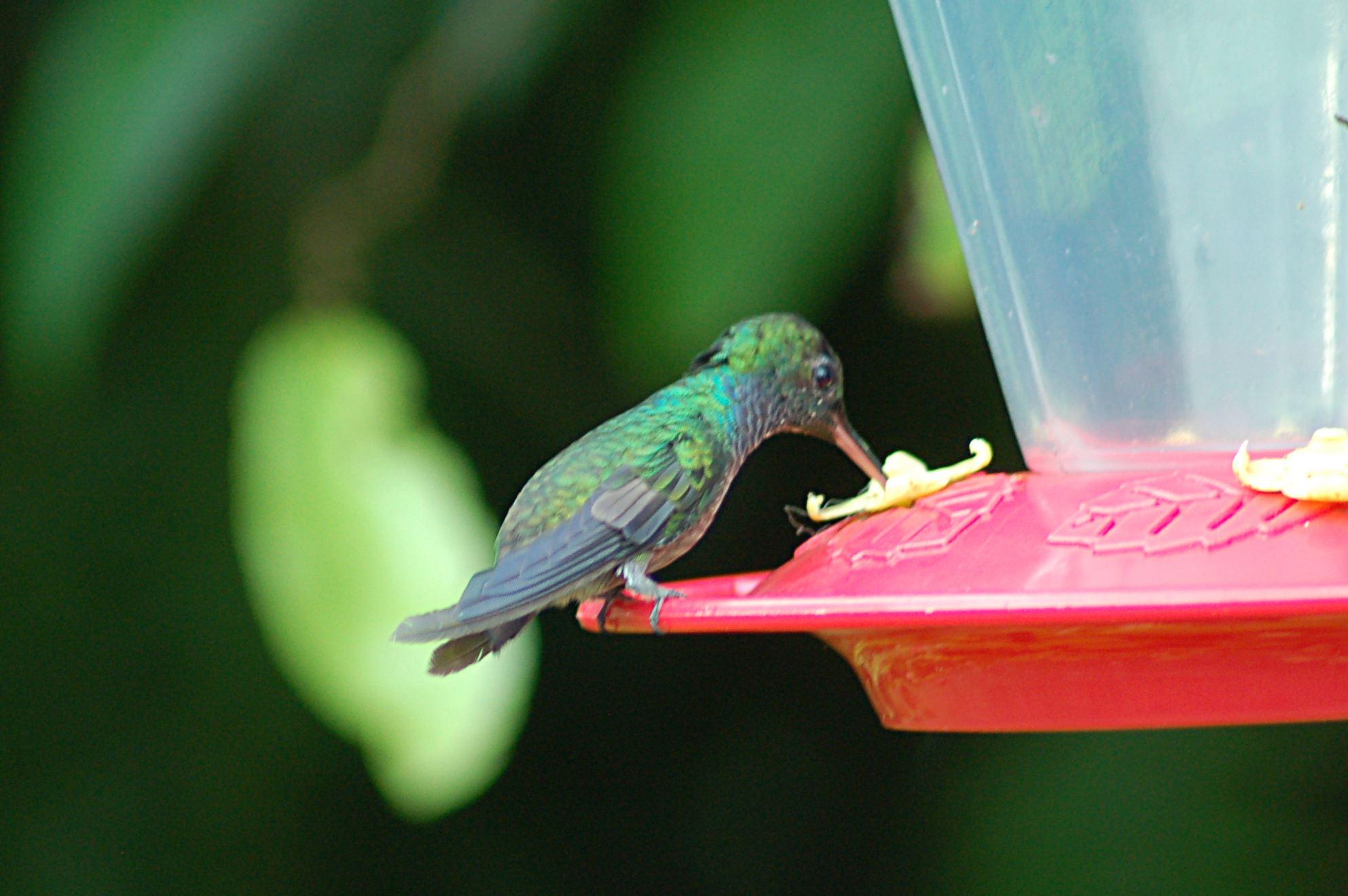

Conservation status
- Least Concern (IUCN 3.1)
- CITES Appendix II

Scientific classification
- Kingdom: Animalia
- Phylum: Chordata
- Class: Aves
- Order: Apodiformes
- Family: Trochilidae
- Genus: Polyerata
- Species: P. rosenbergi

Binomial name
- Polyerata rosenbergi Boucard, 1895

= Purple-chested hummingbird =

Species of bird

The purple-chested hummingbird (Polyerata rosenbergi) is a species of hummingbird in the family Trochilidae. It is found in Colombia and Ecuador. Its natural habitats are subtropical or tropical moist lowland forest and heavily degraded former forest. It is commonly hunted for the supposed medicinal properties of its beak by indigenous peoples in the area.

== Taxonomy ==
This species was formerly placed in the genus Amazilia. A molecular phylogenetic study published in 2014 found that Amazilia was polyphyletic. In the revised classification to create monophyletic genera, the purple-chested hummingbird was moved to the resurrected genus Polyerata.
