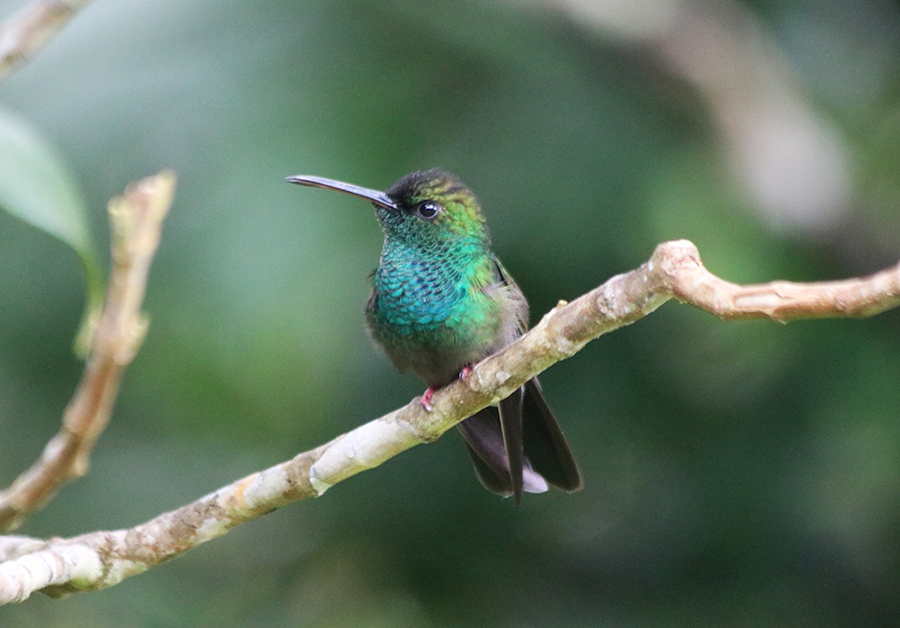

Conservation status
- Least Concern (IUCN 3.1)
- CITES Appendix II

Scientific classification
- Kingdom: Animalia
- Phylum: Chordata
- Class: Aves
- Order: Apodiformes
- Family: Trochilidae
- Genus: Polyerata
- Species: P. amabilis

Binomial name
- Polyerata amabilis (Gould, 1853)

= Blue-chested hummingbird =

Species of bird

The blue-chested hummingbird (Polyerata amabilis) is a species of hummingbird in the family Trochilidae. It is found in Colombia, Costa Rica, Ecuador, Nicaragua, and Panama. Its natural habitats are subtropical or tropical moist lowland forest and heavily degraded former forest.

The hummingbird feeds by trap-lining and also defends feeding territory (particularly in nectar-poor habitat), taking nectar and also small insects gleaned from foliage. These foraging territories are often on the borders of forests in areas of scattered flowers. The males will form leks to try to gain the attention of females during breeding season.

This species was formerly placed in the genus Amazilia. A molecular phylogenetic study published in 2014 found that Amazilia was polyphyletic. In the revised classification to create monophyletic genera, the blue-chested hummingbird was moved to the resurrected genus Polyerata.
