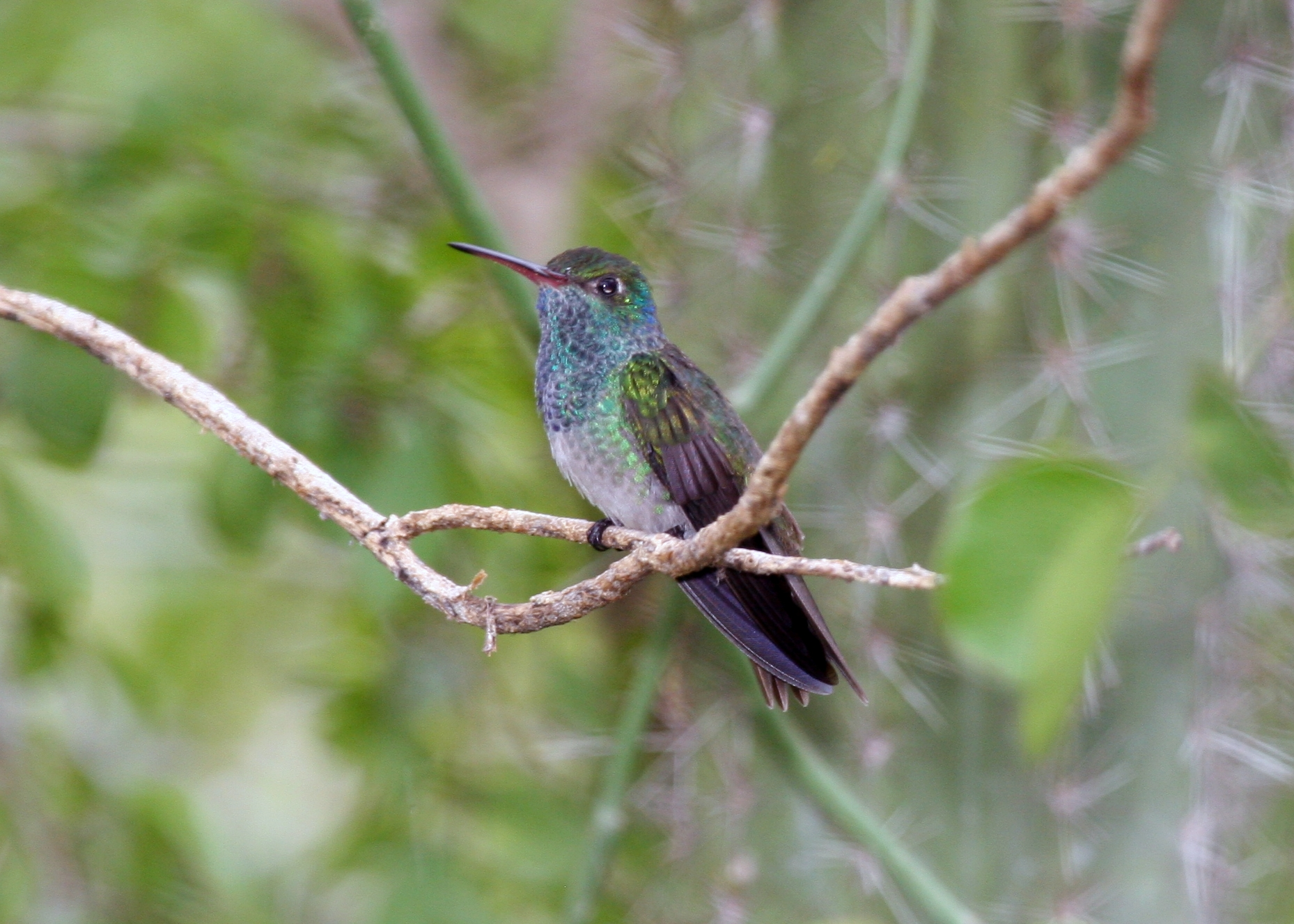

Conservation status
- Vulnerable (IUCN 3.1)
- CITES Appendix II

Scientific classification
- Kingdom: Animalia
- Phylum: Chordata
- Class: Aves
- Order: Apodiformes
- Family: Trochilidae
- Genus: Amazilia
- Species: A. luciae

Binomial name
- Amazilia luciae (Lawrence, 1868)

= Honduran emerald =

Species of hummingbird

The Honduran emerald (Amazilia luciae) is a vulnerable species of hummingbird in the "emeralds" tribe, Trochilini, of the subfamily Trochilinae. It is endemic to Honduras.

== Taxonomy ==
The Honduran emerald was formally described in 1868 by the American amateur ornithologist George Newbold Lawrence based on a specimen collected in Honduras. He placed the species in the genus Thaumatias and coined the binomial name Thaumatias luciae. He chose the epithet to honor Lucy Brewer, the daughter of the ornithologist Thomas Mayo Brewer. The Honduran emerald is now placed with four other species in the genus Amazilia that was introduced in 1843 by the French naturalist René Lesson. The genus name comes from the Inca heroine in Jean-François Marmontel's novel Les Incas, ou la destruction de l'Empire du Pérou. The species is monotypic: no subspecies are recognised.

== Description ==
The Honduran emerald is 9 to 10 cm (3.5 to 3.9 in) long. Both sexes have a medium length bill, slightly decurved, with a black maxilla and a red mandible with a black tip. Adult males have a dark green crown and upperparts that become bronzy on the lower back and uppertail coverts. Its central tail feathers are dark green, the rest dark green with a bronzy cast near the end, and all have a purplish band near the tip. Its gorget and upper breast are medium blue that may appear greenish or grayish in different lights. Its breast is grayish white with green sides and duller bronze green flanks. Its undertail coverts are dark green with white edges. The adult female has similar plumage but is overall duller. Its gorget is smaller and greener than the male's and its outer tail feathers have gray tips. Immature birds are similar to the female.

The call is "a hard, slightly metallic ticking call, often steadily repeated 'chik, chik-chik, chik chik..." and "a hard, slightly buzzy chattering given in flight 'zzchi ---' and 'chik chi zzhi ---'." Other vocalizations include "a dry, quiet gruff warbling" (which might be its song), "a hard buzzy chatter 'chirr-rr-irr-rr-rr'", and "a high sharp 'siik' given in pursuit."

== Distribution and habitat ==
The Honduran emerald is found in three widely separated areas of northern Honduras, in the departments of Santa Bárbara, Cortés, Yoro, and Olancho. Until the 1950s the species was known only from a few specimens taken in the last two of them. It was not again observed until 1988, in Yoro, and was first documented in Santa Bárbara and Cortés in 2007. Since then the species has been observed somewhat more widely than before within each of the three general areas. The Honduran emerald's movements are imperfectly known. In the east in some seasons it is "one of the most conspicuous bird species" in its habitat; at other times it is almost absent. Short distance migration is a potential explanation.

The Honduran emerald inhabits tropical dry forests, typically in intermontane valleys. The forests are generally of low to medium height with an open to partially close canopy. Those in the western departments of Santa Bárbara and Cortés are the taller and denser and are described as semi-deciduous. The emerald has also been observed in those departments in thorn forest, pine-oak forest, and the edges of pasture. In the west it tends to inhabit the valley slopes at elevations between 200 and 500 m (660 and 1,600 ft). The forests in the eastern departments of Santa Bárbara and Cortés have been described as dry tropical forest, thorn forest, or xeric woodland; the trees are deciduous or semi-deciduous. Here the species inhabits the valley floors, like in the west at elevations between 200 and 500 m (660 and 1,600 ft). In both east and west the topography is quite variable on a small scale, with differences in soil type, precipitation, and microhabitat that make determination of the species' exact habitat preferences and requirements difficult.

== Behavior ==
=== Feeding ===
The Honduran emerald forages for nectar at a wide variety of flower sources, seeking it at all levels of the forest. At least 22 species of plants have been documented as nectar sources; examples include cacti, thorny shrubs and trees, vine, herbs, epiphytes, and parasitic plants. In the west its primary source is Helicteres guazumaefolia, which flowers year-round. In the east the species seems to favor Pedilanthus camporum and Nopalea hondurensis. It appears to sometimes defend nectar sources. In addition to nectar the Honduran emerald feeds on small arthropods. Anderson et al. (2010) provide a detailed dietary analysis.

=== Breeding ===
One nest of the Honduran emerald was made of seed fluff and dried leaves bound with spiderweb with lichen on the outside. It was sited 2.3 m (7.5 ft) up in a Eugenia lempana tree. Nothing else is known about the species' breeding phenology.

=== Predator response ===
The Honduran emerald responds and joins mobs after hearing the calls of potential predators, especially the ferruginous pygmy owl (Glaucidium brasilianum).

== Status ==
The IUCN originally assessed the Honduran emerald as Threatened, then in 1994 as Critically Endangered, in 2011 as Endangered, and since 2020 as Vulnerable. The downlistings followed the increasing knowledge of the species' distribution. However, it still has a very small and fragmented range. Its estimated population of between 10,000 and 20,000 mature individuals is believed to be decreasing. The main threat is the continuing conversion of its habitat to agriculture and human habitation. The American Bird Conservancy has estimated that 90 percent of its original habitat has been lost. The organization helped create and later expand a protected area for the species in the Aguan Valley of Yoro department.
