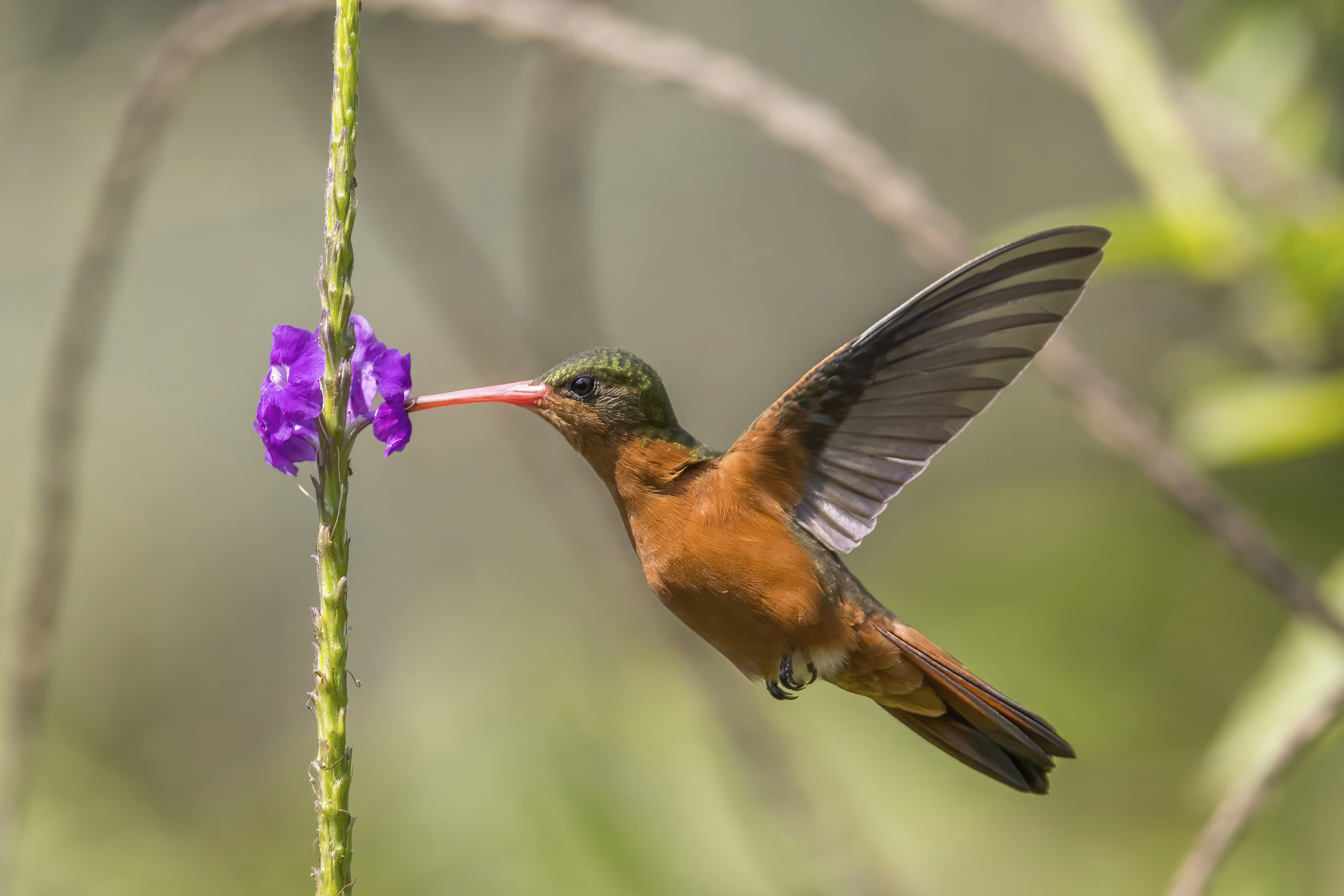
- A. r. rutila Suchitepéquez Dept., Guatemala.

Conservation status
- Least Concern (IUCN 3.1)
- CITES Appendix II

Scientific classification
- Kingdom: Animalia
- Phylum: Chordata
- Class: Aves
- Order: Apodiformes
- Family: Trochilidae
- Genus: Amazilia
- Species: A. rutila

Binomial name
- Amazilia rutila (Delattre, 1843)
- Range of A. rutila

= Cinnamon hummingbird =

Species of bird

The cinnamon hummingbird (Amazilia rutila) is a species of hummingbird (named for its brilliant brown gold color) in the tribe of the 'emeralds', Trochilini (subfamily Trochilinae). Currently, four regional subspecies are recognized.

Cinnamon hummingbirds are typically found at or just slightly above sea level, often inhabiting coastal and lowland areas, as well as further inland in warmer locations in the southern parts of their range. They are predominantly found along the Pacific western coast of México and south through Guatemala, El Salvador, Honduras, Nicaragua and Costa Rica. They are also found in Belize and the southern Mexican states of Campeche, Quintana Roo and Yucatán.

== Taxonomy ==
The cinnamon hummingbird was formally described in 1842 by French naturalist René Lesson after a specimen he had collected near Acapulco, Guerrero, in southwestern Mexico. Lesson placed the new species in the genus Ornismya and coined the binomial name Ornismya cinnamomea. Unfortunately, the specific epithet was already in-use, as Paul Gervais had previously used O. cinnamomeus for a separate species of hummingbird described in 1835. In 1843, French ornithologist Adolphe Delattre introduced O. rutila as a new name for Lesson's hummingbird.

Today, the cinnamon hummingbird is placed in the genus Amazilia, first introduced by Lesson in 1843. The generic name comes from an Inca heroine in Jean-François Marmontel's novel Les Incas, ou la destruction de l'Empire du Pérou ("The Incas, or the destruction of the Peruvian Empire"). The specific epithet rutila is from the Latin rutilus, meaning "golden", "red" or "auburn".

Four subspecies are recognised:

- Amazilia rutila diluta (Van Rossem, 1938)
- Amazilia rutila graysoni (Lawrence, 1867)—Islas Marías, Mexico
- Amazilia rutila rutila (DeLattre, 1843)—Western coastal Mexico
- Amazilia rutila corallirostris (Bourcier & Mulsant, 1846)—Honduras and Nicaragua

It has been suggested that graysoni be treated as a separate species, due to its restricted and isolated range on the Islas Marías. Additionally, it has been debated as to whether or not diluta should be included with rutila, as the two subspecies intergrade.

== Description ==
The cinnamon hummingbird is 9.5 to 11.5 cm (3.7 to 4.5 in) long and on average weighs about 5 to 5.5 g (0.18 to 0.19 oz). Adults of the nominate subspecies A. r. rutila have metallic bronze green upperparts and cinnamon to cinnamon rufous underparts that are paler on the chin and upper throat. The tail is deep cinnamon rufous to rufous chestnut; the feathers have dark metallic bronze tips and the outermost have dark metallic bronze outer edges. The wings are a dark brownish slate. Males' bills are red with a black tip and females' mostly black with red at the base. Juveniles are similar to adults but have rufous edges to the face, crown, and rump feathers and an all black bill.

The song is "varied, high, thin, slightly squeaky chips, si ch chi-chit or tsi si si-si-sit, or chi chi-chi chi chi, etc." Its call has been described as "a buzzy, scratchy tzip" and "a hard to sharp chik".

Amazilia rutila diluta is similar to the nominate, with slightly less intense green upperparts and paler and pinker underparts. A. r. corallirostris is also similar to the nominate but overall its colors are richer and deeper. A. r. graysoni is significantly larger and darker than the nominate but otherwise similar.

== Distribution and habitat ==
The cinnamon hummingbird is resident throughout its range. The subspecies of cinnamon hummingbird are found in the following regions:

- Amazilia rutila diluta — NW Mexican states of Sinaloa and Nayarit.
- A. rutila graysoni — María Madre and Cleopha Islands, part of the Islas Tres Marías archipelago off the coast of Western Mexico.
- A. r. rutila — Jalisco, Colima, Guerrero, Michoacán and Oaxaca in Mexico; El Salvador, W. Honduras, Nicaragua and Costa Rica.
- A. rutila corallirostris — Chiapas in S. Mexico through to El Salvador.

The populations in Mexico's Yucatán Peninsula, as well as N.E. Honduras, Nicaragua, and Costa Rica, are often attributed to A. r. rutila but have sometimes been considered part of A. r. corallirostris.

The cinnamon hummingbird inhabits primary and secondary deciduous and semi-deciduous forests and thorn forest. It ranges from sea level to about 1,600 m (5,200 ft) of elevation.

== Behavior ==
=== Feeding ===
The cinnamon hummingbird usually forages from the understory to the mid-story, but also will visit taller flowering trees. It feeds on nectar from a very wide variety of flowering plants and also eats insects. It is territorial and defends feeding sites from intrusion by other hummingbirds, bees, and butterflies.

=== Breeding ===
The cinnamon hummingbird's breeding season varies throughout its range; every month is represented somewhere. Its nest is a cup made of plant material and spider web placed on a horizontal branch. Three nests in western Mexico had a small platform of wood pieces under the cup. The cup was made of kapok seed fibers with grass, bits of wood, and lichens on the outside. All three were in semi-deciduous forest. The clutch size is two eggs, but little more is known about the species' breeding phenology.

== Status ==
The IUCN has assessed the cinnamon hummingbird as being of Least Concern. It has a large range and its population is estimated to be at least 500,000 mature individuals and stable. Localized habitat destruction appears to be its only threat.
