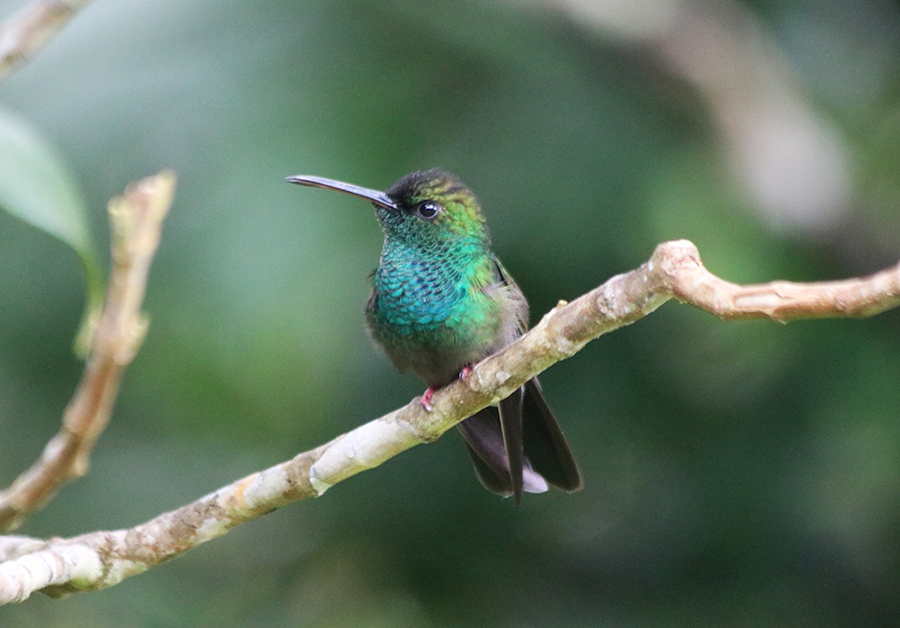
- Blue-chested hummingbird, (Polyerata amabilis)

Scientific classification
- Kingdom: Animalia
- Phylum: Chordata
- Class: Aves
- Order: Apodiformes
- Family: Trochilidae
- Tribe: Trochilini
- Genus: Polyerata; Heine, 1863

Type species
- Trochilus amabilis (blue-chested hummingbird) Gould, 1853

Species
- See text

= Polyerata =

Genus of birds

Polyerata is a genus of hummingbirds.

== Species ==
The genus contains three species:

Genus Polyerata – Heine, 1863 – three species
Common name	Scientific name and subspecies	Range	Size and ecology	IUCN status and estimated population
Blue-chested hummingbird	Polyerata amabilis (Gould, 1853)	Colombia, Costa Rica, Ecuador, Nicaragua, and Panama	Size: Habitat: Diet:	LC
Charming hummingbird	Polyerata decora Salvin, 1891	Costa Rica and Panama.	Size: Habitat: Diet:	LC
Purple-chested hummingbird	Polyerata rosenbergi Boucard, 1895	Colombia and Ecuador.	Size: Habitat: Diet:	LC

These species were formerly placed in the genus Amazilia. A molecular phylogenetic study published in 2014 found that Amazilia was polyphyletic. In the revised classification to create monophyletic genera, these three species were moved to the resurrected genus Polyerata that had been introduced in 1863 by the German ornithologist Ferdinand Heine to accommodate the blue-chested hummingbird which therefore becomes the type species. The genus name is from Ancient Greek poluēratos meaning "very lovely".
