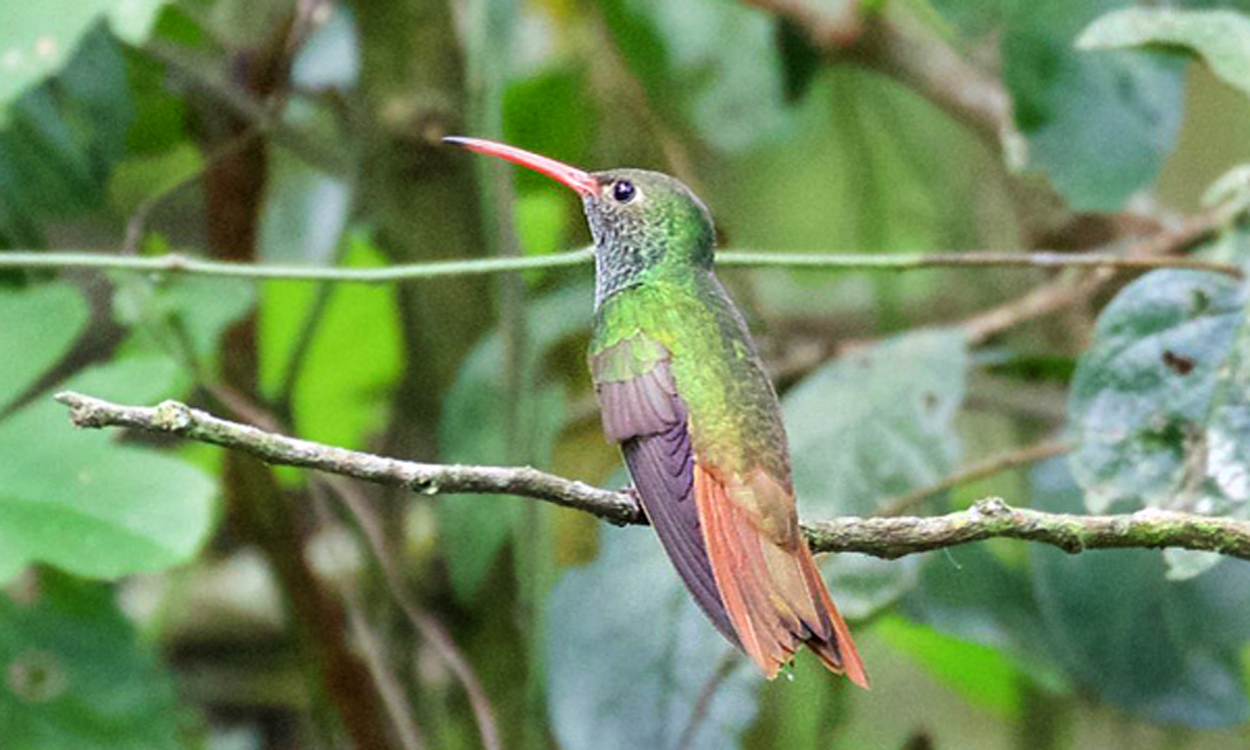

Conservation status
- Least Concern (IUCN 3.1)
- CITES Appendix II

Scientific classification
- Kingdom: Animalia
- Phylum: Chordata
- Class: Aves
- Order: Apodiformes
- Family: Trochilidae
- Genus: Amazilia
- Species: A. yucatanensis

Binomial name
- Amazilia yucatanensis (Cabot, S, 1845)
- Range of A. yucatanensis Wintering range Breeding and wintering range

= Buff-bellied hummingbird =

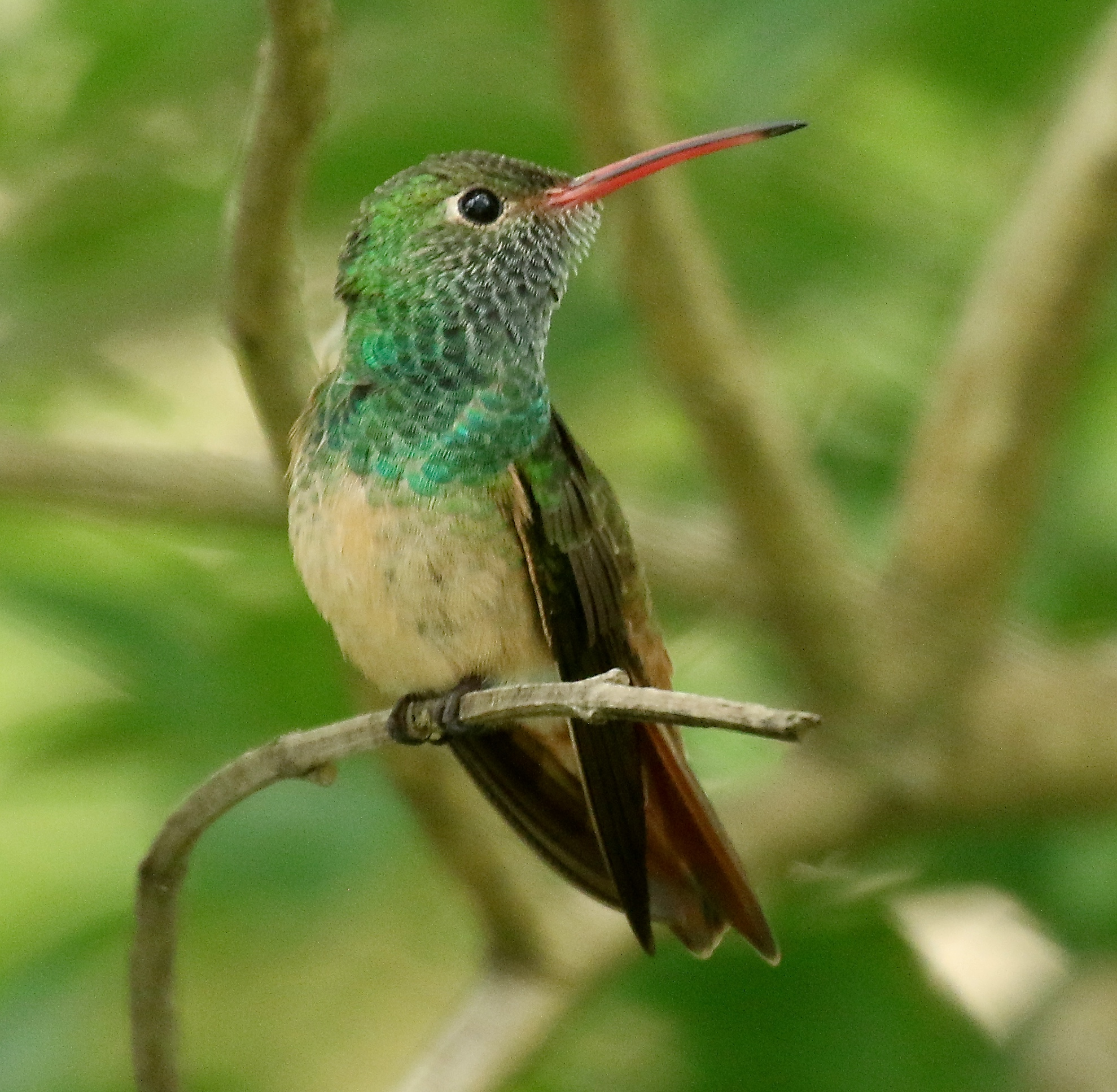
South Padre Island - Texas

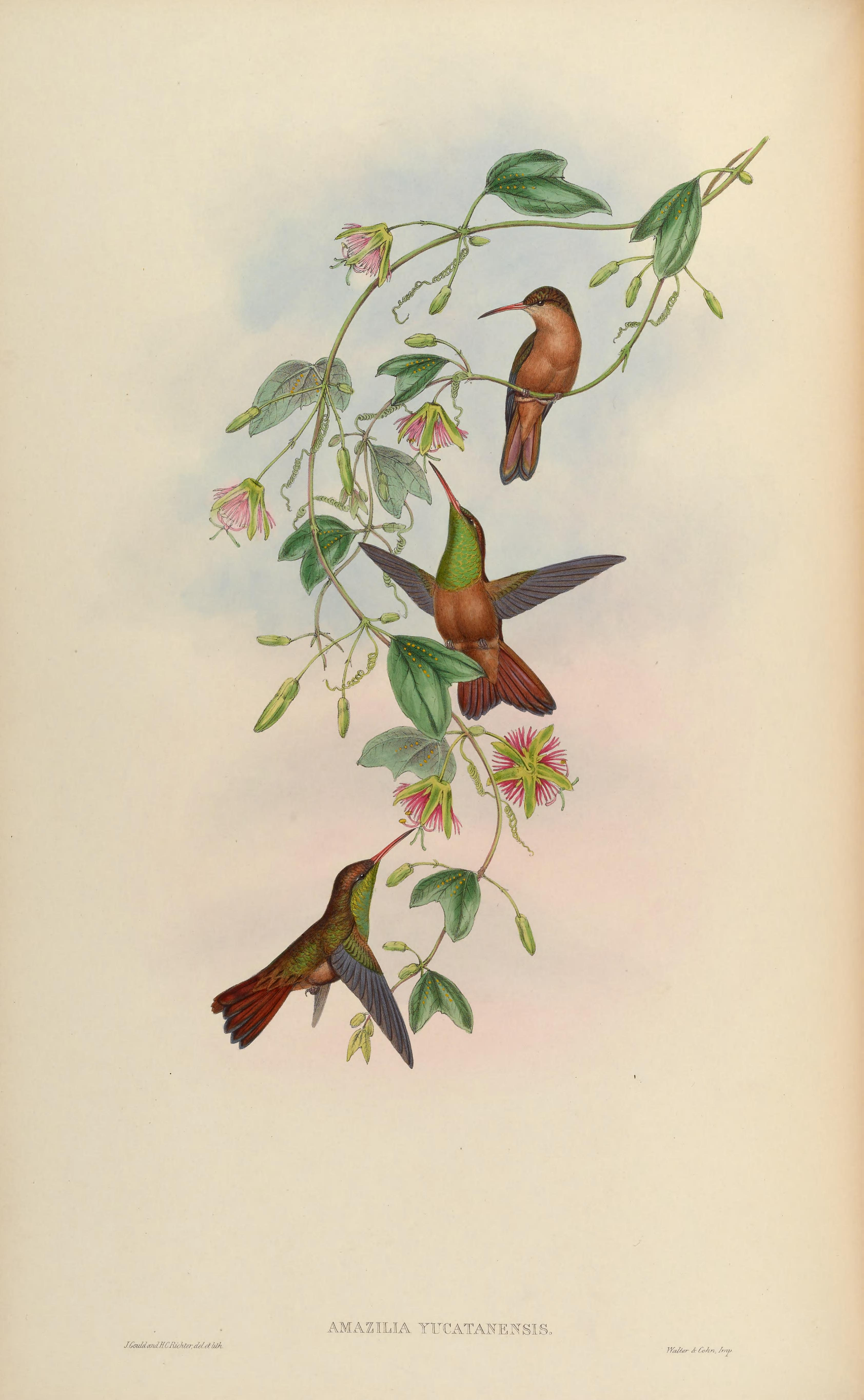
Illustration from John Gould's 1861 monograph: A monograph of the Trochilidae, or family of humming-birds, Volume 5.

The buff-bellied hummingbird (Amazilia yucatanensis) is a species of hummingbird in the "emeralds", tribe Trochilini of subfamily Trochilinae. It is found in Belize, Guatemala, Mexico, and the United States.

== Taxonomy and systematics ==
The buff-bellied hummingbird has three subspecies, the nominate A. y. yucatanensis, A. y. chalconota, and A. y. cerviniventris.

== Description ==
The buff-bellied hummingbird is 10 to 11 cm (3.9 to 4.3 in) long and weighs 2.9 to 4.7 g (0.10 to 0.17 oz). Adult males have a rosy reddish bill that is dusky at the end; females' have more dark on the maxilla. Adult males of the nominate subspecies have metallic bronze green upperparts that are duller and darker on the crown. Their uppertail coverts are a mix of bronze green and cinnamon rufous. Their tail feathers are chestnut at the base and metallic bronze at the end. Their chin, throat, and chest are bright metallic yellowish emerald green and the vent area and undertail coverts are deep cinnamon rufous. The adult female is similar to the male but with a less iridescent back and throat. Its central tail feathers are mostly greenish bronze and the outer ones are mostly chestnut with greenish bronze edges and tips.

Subspecies A. y. chalconota has a bronze sheen on its upperparts, and its vent area and undertail coverts are light cinnamon-buff with bronze or bronze-green interspersed. A. y. cerviniventris is very like chalconota but with less bronze on the upperparts.

== Distribution and habitat ==
The nominate subspecies of buff-bellied hummingbird is found year-round from northern Belize and northwestern Guatemala north to Tabasco, Campeche, and Yucatán in southeastern Mexico. A. y. chalconota is found year-round from extreme southern Texas south in Mexico as far as north-central Veracruz and also in winter further north and east in the U.S. Subspecies A. y. cerviniventris is found year-round from central Veracruz south through Puebla and Oaxaca to northern Chiapas.

The buff-bellied hummingbird inhabits a variety of landscapes in its year-round range, most of which are semi-open to open and rather dry. They include scrubby woodlands, the edges of denser forest, thorn forest, oak woodlands and "islands" in grasslands, and urban and suburban parks and gardens. Details are lacking about its habitat preferences in the U.S. during winter dispersal.

== Behavior ==
=== Movement ===
The buff-bellied hummingbird's migration pattern has not been exactly determined. Except in northern Mexico and Texas it appears to be sedentary. Some members of subspecies A. y. chalconota disperse north and east along the Gulf Coast, regularly as far as the Florida panhandle and irregularly to elsewhere in Florida and as far north as North Carolina.

=== Feeding ===
The buff-bellied hummingbird feeds on nectar from a very wide variety of flowering plants, shrubs, and trees including those with non-tubular blossoms. It nectars by hovering rather than perching. It is very territorial, vigorously defending feeding sites including sugar water feeders from other hummingbirds and some insects. In addition to nectar it feeds on small arthropods captured on the wing or by gleaning from vegetation.

=== Breeding ===
The buff-bellied hummingbird's breeding season in south Texas is mostly between late March and early August but nesting has occurred both earlier and later. On the Yucatán Peninsula nesting may start as early as January and continue to at least mid-April. In "eastern Mexico" the nesting season has been reported as being from April to July. The nest is a cup of plant and other fibers such as thistledown, grass, hair, and nylon bound with spiderweb and covered with lichens and bark shreds. It is typically placed in a branch fork of a small tree or shrub between 1 and 3 m (3 and 10 ft) above the ground, though sometimes higher. The incubation period and time to fledging are not known.

=== Vocalization ===
The buff-bellied hummingbird's vocalizations have been well studied only in Texas. Displaying individuals make a two-syllable "tsi-we" call. During feeding it makes "tik" or "tik-k" notes. When chasing other hummingbirds it gives a "long, low call with notes repeated rapidly (see-see-see-see-su-su)"; this vocalization has also been described as the species' song.

== Status ==
The IUCN has assessed the buff-bellied hummingbird as being of Least Concern. It has a very large range, and though its population size is not known it been increasing since at least the 1980s. No immediate threats have been identified. In much of its range a significant amount of its natural habitat has been converted for agriculture, grazing, and human residence. The "effect of land-clearing on this hummingbird, however, has not been documented."
