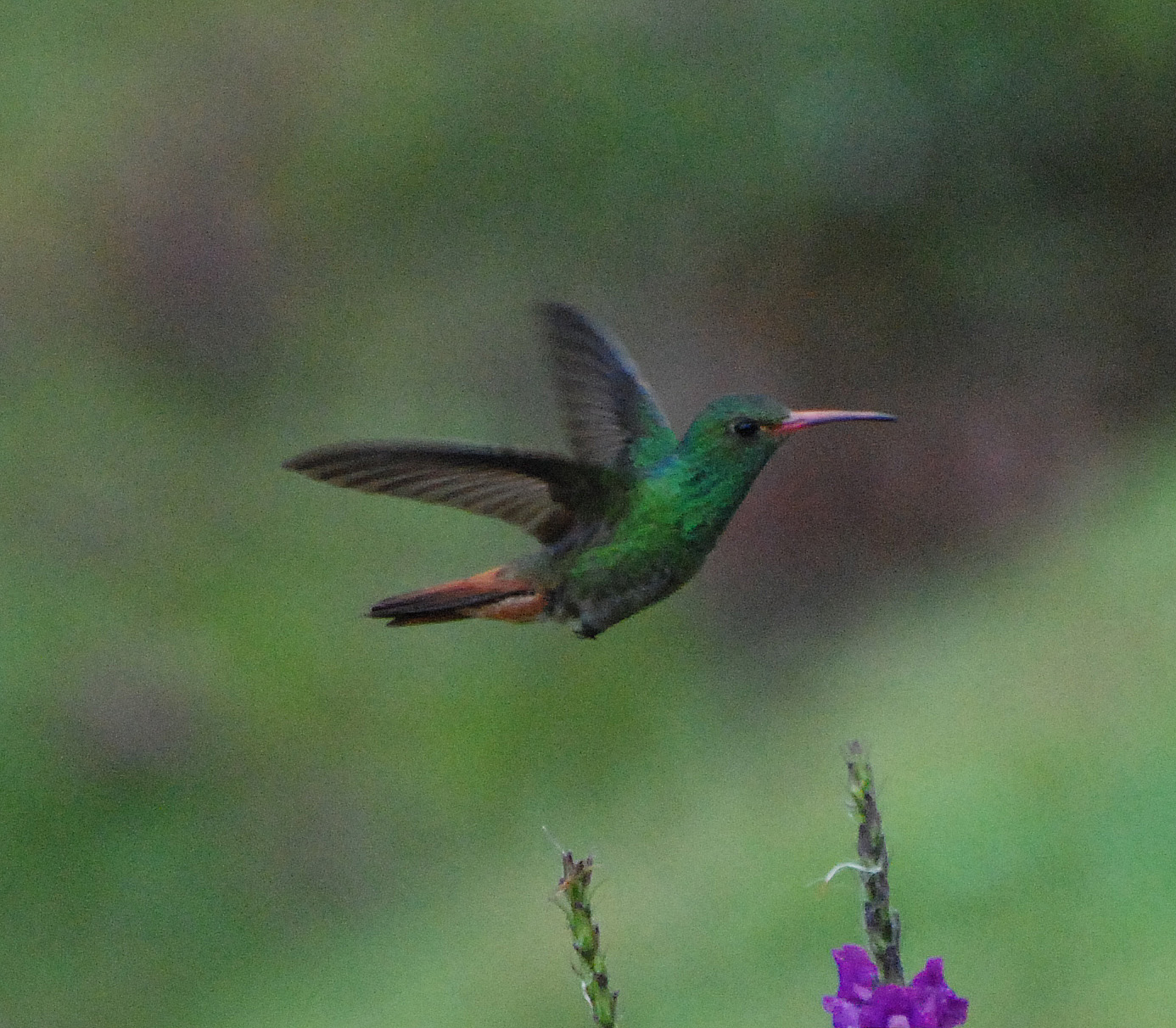
- Rufous-tailed hummingbird, Amazilia tzacatl

Scientific classification
- Kingdom: Animalia
- Phylum: Chordata
- Class: Aves
- Order: Apodiformes
- Family: Trochilidae
- Tribe: Trochilini
- Genus: Amazilia; Lesson, RP, 1843

Type species
- Ornismya cinnamomea = Ornismia rutila Lesson, 1842

Species
- see text

= Amazilia =

Genus of birds

Amazilia is a hummingbird genus in the subfamily Trochilinae. It is found in tropical Central and South America.

== Taxonomy ==
The genus Amazilia was introduced in 1843 by the French naturalist René Lesson. Lesson had used amazilia in 1827 as the specific epithet of the amazilia hummingbird which is now the only species placed in the genus Amazilis. The name comes from the Inca heroine in Jean-François Marmontel's novel Les Incas, ou la destruction de l'Empire du Pérou. The type species was subsequently designated as the cinnamon hummingbird.

The genus contains four species:

Genus Amazilia – Lesson, RP, 1843 – four species
| Common name | Scientific name and subspecies | Range | Size and ecology | IUCN status and estimated population |
|---|---|---|---|---|
| Cinnamon hummingbird | Amazilia rutila (Delattre, 1843) Four subspecies: A. r. diluta (Van Rossem, 1938); A. r. graysoni (Lawrence, 1867); A. r. rutila (DeLattre, 1843); A. r. corallirostris (Bourcier & Mulsant, 1846) | México and south through Guatemala, El Salvador, Honduras, Nicaragua and Costa Rica | Size: Habitat: Diet: | LC |
| Buff-bellied hummingbird | Amazilia yucatanensis (Cabot, S, 1845) Three subspecies: A. y. yucatanensis; A. y. chalconota; A. y. cerviniventris | northern Belize and northwestern Guatemala north to Tabasco, Campeche, and Yucatán in southeastern Mexico | Size: Habitat: Diet: | LC |
| Rufous-tailed hummingbird | Amazilia tzacatl (de la Llave, 1833) Three subspecies: A. t. tzacatl (La Llave, 1833); A. t. handleyi Wetmore, 1963; A. t. fuscicaudata (Fraser, 1840); A. t. brehmi Weller & Schuchmann, 1999; A. t. jucunda (Heine, 1863) | east-central Mexico through Central America and Colombia into Ecuador and Venezuela. | Size: Habitat: Diet: | LC |
| Honduran emerald | Amazilia luciae (Lawrence, 1868) | Honduras. | Size: Habitat: Diet: | VU |

An additional species is sometimes included:

- Guanacaste hummingbird, Amazilia alfaroana (disputed)

This genus formerly included many more species. A molecular phylogenetic study published in 2014 found that the large genus was polyphyletic. In the revised classification to create monophyletic genera, species were moved to Leucolia, Saucerottia, Amazilis, Uranomitra, Chrysuronia, Polyerata, Chionomesa, Elliotomyia and Chlorestes.
