= O =

Fifteenth letter of the Latin alphabet

- O o

Usage
- Writing system: Latin script
- Type: Alphabetic
- Language of origin: Latin language
- Sound values: [o]; [o̞]; [ɔ]; [əʊ]; [əʉ]; [oʊ]; [ɐʊ]; [ɐʉ]; [ɒʊ]; [uː]; [ʉː]; [ʌ]; [ɒ]; [ɑ]; [ø]; [a]; [ʕ]; [w]; [◌ʷ]; [ʊ]; [ɵ]; [ə]; [ɐ]
- In Unicode: U+004F, U+006F
- Alphabetical position: 15

History
Development
D4
      - Ο ο
        - 𐌏
          - O o
- Time period: c. 700 BCE to present
- Descendants: Ö; ⱺ; Ø; Œ; Ɔ; Ơ; Ỏ; Ꝋ; ∅; º; ℅
- Sisters: ᴥ; Ƹ; ʿ; О; Ю; Ө; ע; ع; ܥ; ࠏ; ዐ; ࡘ; ჺ; Ո ո; Օ օ; ᱳ; ᱜ ᱣ

Other
- Associated graphs: o(x)
- Writing direction: Left-to-right

O (minuscule: o) is the fifteenth letter and the fourth vowel letter of the Latin alphabet, used in the modern English alphabet, the alphabets of other western European languages and others worldwide. Its name in English is o (pronounced /ˈoʊ/), plural oes.

== Name ==
In English, the name of the letter is the "long O" sound, pronounced /ˈoʊ/. In most other languages, its name matches the letter's pronunciation in open syllables.

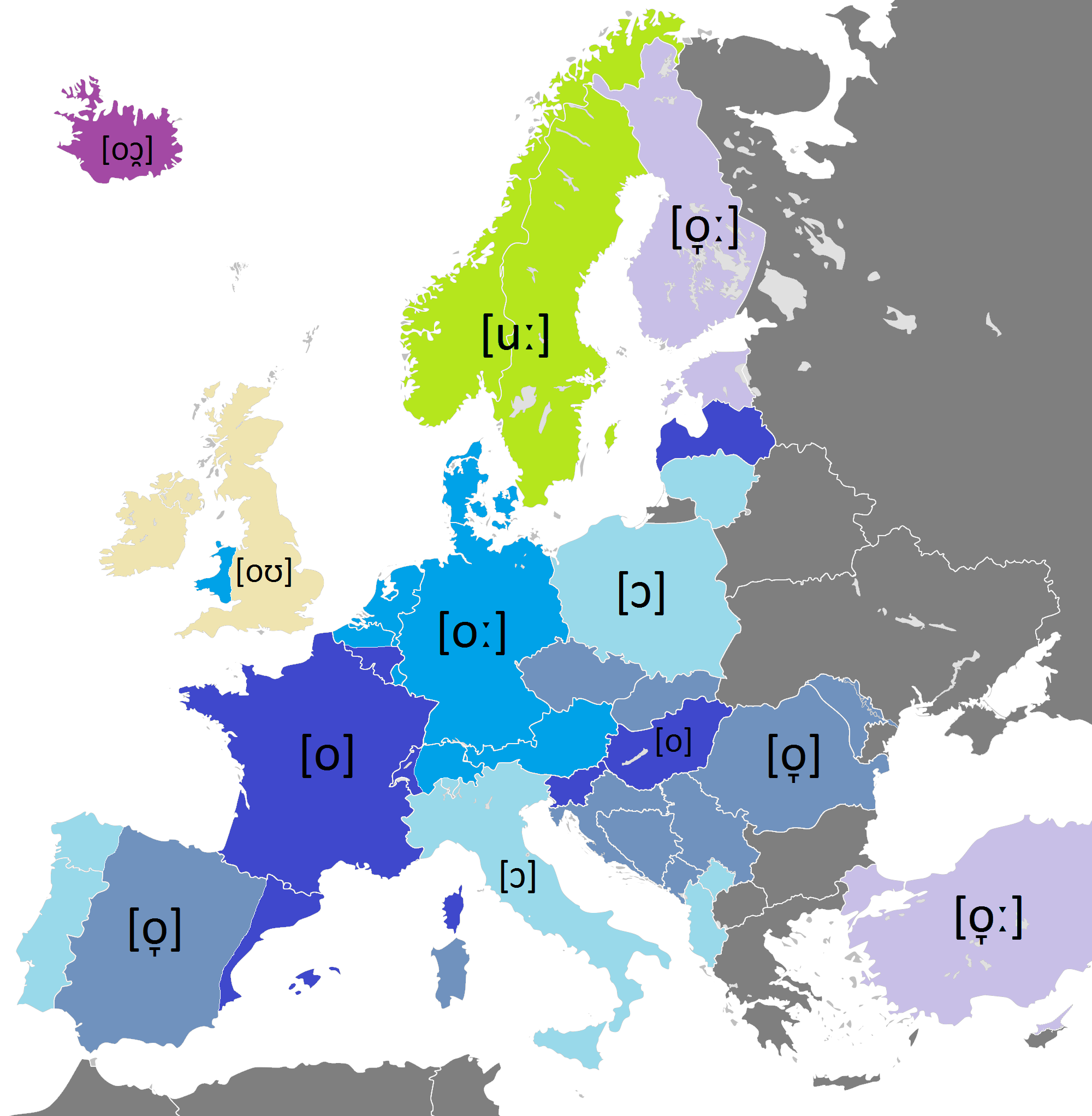
Pronunciation of the name of the letter ⟨o⟩ in European languages

== History ==
Egyptian	Phoenician Ayin	Western Greek Omicron	Etruscan O	Latin O
Egyptian Hieroglyph describing an eye				Latin O

Its graphic form has remained fairly constant from Phoenician times until today. The name of the Phoenician letter was ʿeyn, meaning "eye", and its shape originates simply as a drawing of a human eye (possibly inspired by the corresponding Egyptian hieroglyph, cf. Proto-Sinaitic script). Its original sound value was that of a consonant, probably [ʕ], the sound represented by the cognate Arabic letter ع ʿayn.

The use of this Phoenician letter for a vowel sound is due to the early Greek alphabets, which adopted the letter "omicron" to represent the vowel /o/. The letter was adopted with the value in the Old Italic alphabets, including the early Latin alphabet. In Greek, a variation of the form later came to differentiate this long sound (omega, meaning "large O") from the short o (Omicron, meaning "small o"). The Greek omicron gave rise to the corresponding Cyrillic letter O.

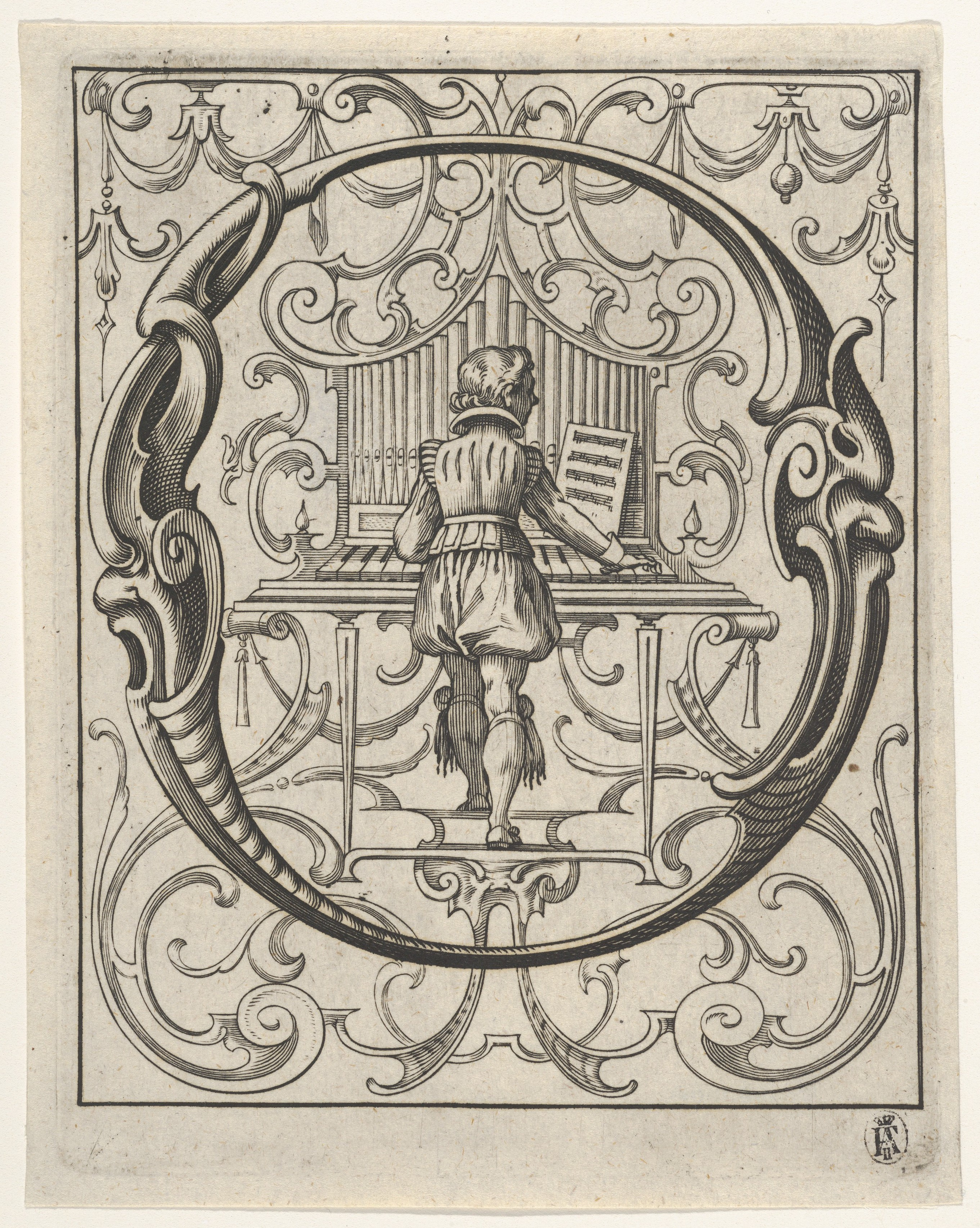
Late Renaissance or early Baroque design of an O, from 1627

== Use in writing systems ==
Pronunciation of ⟨o⟩ by language
Orthography	Phonemes
Catalan	/ɔ/, /o/, /u/, /w/
Standard Chinese (Pinyin)	/ə/, /u/
Czech	/o/
Danish	/ɔ/, /o/, /oː/
Dutch	/ɔ/, /oː/, /ə/
English	/ɒ/, /oʊ/, /ə/, /ɔː/, /ʌ/, /w/
French	/o/, /ɔ/
German	/ɔ/, /oː/, /o/
Irish	/ɔ/, /ə/
Italian	/o/, /ɔ/
Malagasy	/u/
Malay	/ɔ/
Norwegian	/ɔ/, /ʊ/, /oː/, /uː/
Occitan	/u/
Polish	/ɔ/
Portuguese	/ɔ/, /o/, /u/, /w/
Spanish	/o/
Slovak	/ɔ/
Swedish	/ɔ/, /oː/, /uː/
Turkish	/o/

=== English ===
The letter ⟨o⟩ is the fourth most common letter in the English alphabet. Like the other English vowel letters, it has associated "long" and "short" pronunciations. The "long" ⟨o⟩ as in both is actually most often a diphthong /oʊ/ (realized dialectically anywhere from [o] to [əʊ]). In English, there is also a "short" ⟨o⟩ as in fox, /ɒ/, which sounds slightly different in different dialects. In most dialects of British English, it is either an open-mid back rounded vowel [ɔ] or an open back rounded vowel [ɒ]; in American English, it is most commonly an unrounded back [ɑ] to a central vowel [a].

Common digraphs include ⟨oo⟩, which represents either /uː/, /ʊ/ or /ʌ/; ⟨oi⟩ or ⟨oy⟩, which typically represents the diphthong /ɔɪ/, and ⟨ao⟩, ⟨oe⟩, and ⟨ou⟩ which represent a variety of pronunciations depending on context and etymology.

In other contexts, especially before a letter with a minim, ⟨o⟩ may represent the sound /ʌ/, as in 'son' or 'love'. It can also represent the semivowel /w/, as in choir or quinoa.

"O" in isolation is a word, also spelled "oh" and pronounced /oʊ/. Before a noun, usually capitalized, it indicates a noun of address, as in the titles "O Canada" or "O Captain! My Captain!" or in certain verses of the Bible.

=== Other languages ===
⟨o⟩ is commonly associated with the open-mid back rounded vowel [ɔ], mid back rounded vowel [o̞] or close-mid back rounded vowel [o] in many languages. Other languages use ⟨o⟩ for various values, usually back vowels which are at least partly open. Derived letters such as ⟨ö⟩ and ⟨ø⟩ have been created for the alphabets of some languages to distinguish values that were not present in Latin and Greek, particularly rounded front vowels.

=== Other systems ===
In the International Phonetic Alphabet, ⟨o⟩ represents the close-mid back rounded vowel.

== Other uses ==
- Oxygen, symbol O, a chemical element

== Related characters ==
=== Descendants and related characters in the Latin alphabet ===
- Œ œ : Latin OE ligature
- O with diacritics: Ø ø Ǿ ǿ Ö ö Ȫ ȫ Ó ó Ò ò Ô ô Ố ố Ồ ồ Ổ ổ Ỗ ỗ Ộ ộ Ǒ ǒ Ő ő Ŏ ŏ Ȏ ȏ Ȯ ȯ Ȱ ȱ Ọ ọ Ɵ ɵ ᶱ Ơ ơ Ớ ớ Ờ ờ Ỡ ỡ Ợ ợ Ở ở Ỏ ỏ Ō ō Ṓ ṓ Ṑ ṑ Õ õ Ȭ ȭ Ṍ ṍ Ṏ ṏ Ǫ ǫ Ȍ ȍ O̩ o̩ Ó̩ ó̩ Ò̩ ò̩ Ǭ ǭ O͍ o͍
- Ꝍ ꝍ : O with loop was used in some medieval Nordic orthographies
- Ꟁ ꟁ : Old Polish O
- ⱺ : Small o with low ring inside is used in the Swedish Dialect Alphabet
- IPA-specific symbols related to O: ɔ
- IPA superscript letters: 𐞢 𐞣
- RFE Phonetic Alphabet-specific symbols related to O:
  - U+1DF58 𝽘 LATIN SMALL LETTER SPLIT O
  - U+1DFCE 𝿎 MODIFIER LETTER SMALL SPLIT O
- Uralic Phonetic Alphabet-specific symbols related to O:
  - U+1D0F ᴏ LATIN LETTER SMALL CAPITAL O
  - U+1D3C ᴼ MODIFIER LETTER CAPITAL O
  - U+1D52 ᵒ MODIFIER LETTER SMALL O
  - U+1D11 ᴑ LATIN SMALL LETTER SIDEWAYS O
  - U+1D13 ᴓ LATIN SMALL LETTER SIDEWAYS O WITH STROKE
  - U+1D16 ᴖ LATIN SMALL LETTER TOP HALF O
  - U+1D17 ᴗ LATIN SMALL LETTER BOTTOM HALF O
  - U+1D54 ᵔ MODIFIER LETTER SMALL TOP HALF O
  - U+1D55 ᵕ MODIFIER LETTER SMALL BOTTOM HALF O
- Teuthonista phonetic transcription-specific symbols related to O:
  - U+AB3D ꬽ LATIN SMALL LETTER BLACKLETTER O
  - U+AB3E ꬾ LATIN SMALL LETTER BLACKLETTER O WITH STROKE
  - U+AB3F ꬿ LATIN SMALL LETTER OPEN O WITH STROKE
  - U+AB43 ꭃ LATIN SMALL LETTER TURNED O OPEN-O
  - U+AB44 ꭄ LATIN SMALL LETTER TURNED O OPEN-O WITH STROKE
- U+2092 ₒ LATIN SUBSCRIPT SMALL LETTER O is used in Indo-European studies
- U+1DF1B 𝼛 LATIN SMALL LETTER O WITH RETROFLEX HOOK is used in phonetic transcription
- U+1DF72 𝽲 LATIN CAPITAL LETTER O WITH CURL and U+1DF73 𝽳 LATIN SMALL LETTER O WITH CURL : O with curl is used in the English Phonotypic Alphabet

=== Derived signs, symbols and abbreviations ===
- Ꝋ ꝋ : Forms of O were used for medieval scribal abbreviations
- ∅ : empty set symbol
- º : Masculine ordinal indicator
- Calligraphic O (𝒪, 𝓸): Mathematical Alphanumeric Symbols

=== Ancestors and siblings in other alphabets ===
- 𐤏 : Semitic letter Ayin, from which the following symbols originally derive:
  - Ω ω : Greek letter Omega
  - Ο ο : Greek letter Omicron
    - Ⲟ ⲟ : Coptic letter O, which derives from Greek omicron
    - О о : Cyrillic letter O, which also derives from Omicron
    - 𐌏 : Old Italic O, which derives from Greek Omicron, and is the ancestor of modern Latin O
    - Օ օ : Armenian letter O

== Other representations ==
=== Computing ===
- U+004F O LATIN CAPITAL LETTER O
- U+006F o LATIN SMALL LETTER O
- U+FF2F Ｏ FULLWIDTH LATIN CAPITAL LETTER O
- U+FF4F ｏ FULLWIDTH LATIN SMALL LETTER O

=== Other ===
NATO phonetic	Morse code
Oscar	▄▄▄ ▄▄▄ ▄▄▄

Signal flag

Flag semaphore
American manual alphabet (ASL fingerspelling)
British manual alphabet (BSL fingerspelling)
Braille dots-135
Unified English Braille

== See also ==
- O mark
- Open O (Ɔ ɔ)
- 0 (zero). The capital letter O may be mistaken or misused for the number 0, as they appear quite identical in some typefaces. Early typewriters did not have a 'zero' key.
