= Ollantay =

Quechua drama

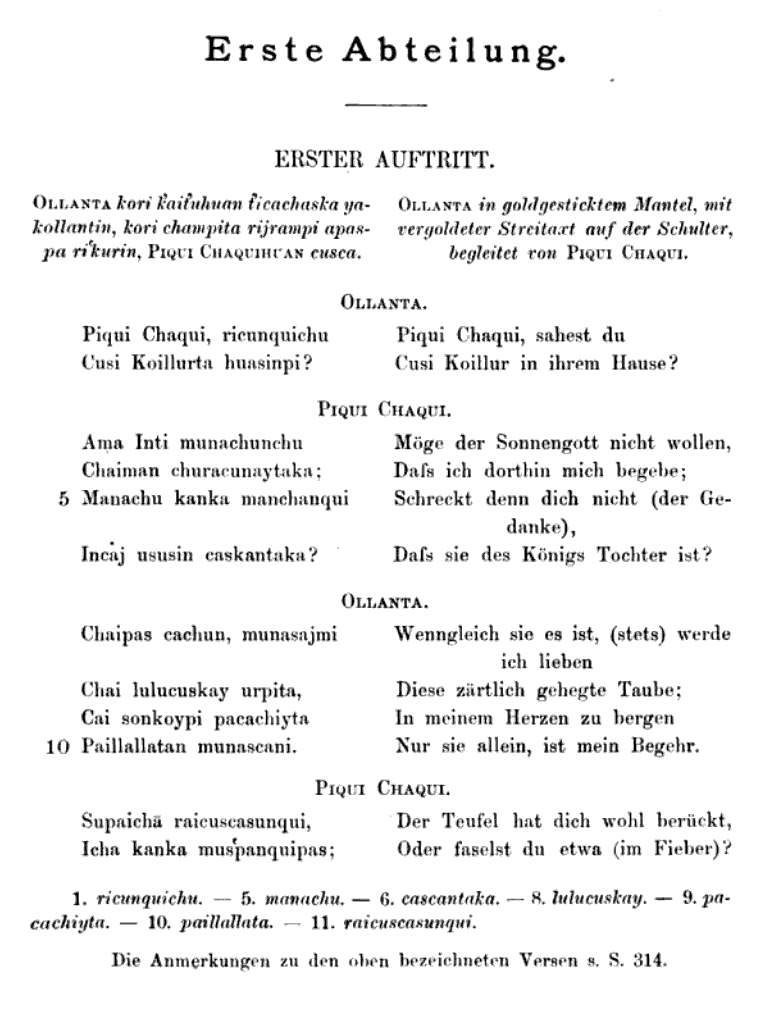
- Drama Ollanta, edition of Ernst Middendorf, 1890, beginning
- Original language: Quechua
- Characters: Ollantay; Cusi Coyllur; Rumi Ñahui; Pachacútec
- Genre: Historical drama
- Setting: Inca Empire

Ollantay is a dramatic play, originally written in the Quechua language. It is considered by some to be of Inca origin—and as such the oldest and deepest expression of Quechua literature—while others believe it to be of colonial Hispanic origin.

The oldest known manuscript of Ollantay belonged to the priest Antonio Valdés (18th century), who for some time was thought to be the original author; however, other differing manuscripts have been found that suggest the existence of a common, more remote, origin. The most widely accepted theory is that the story is of Incan origin and was preserved through oral tradition until it was adapted for theatrical presentation in colonial times.

Ollantay was first published in 1857 by Johann Jakob von Tschudi, in Quechua and German. An account of the drama, with extracts, had appeared earlier in Antigüedades peruanas (1851), the archaeological study Tschudi produced with Mariano Eduardo de Rivero y Ustáriz. The first Spanish version appeared in Lima in 1868, published by José Sebastián Barranca and subtitled "The tribulations of a father and the generosity of a king" (Los rigores de un padre y la generosidad de un rey); since then different versions have been published in a variety of languages.

== Possible authors ==
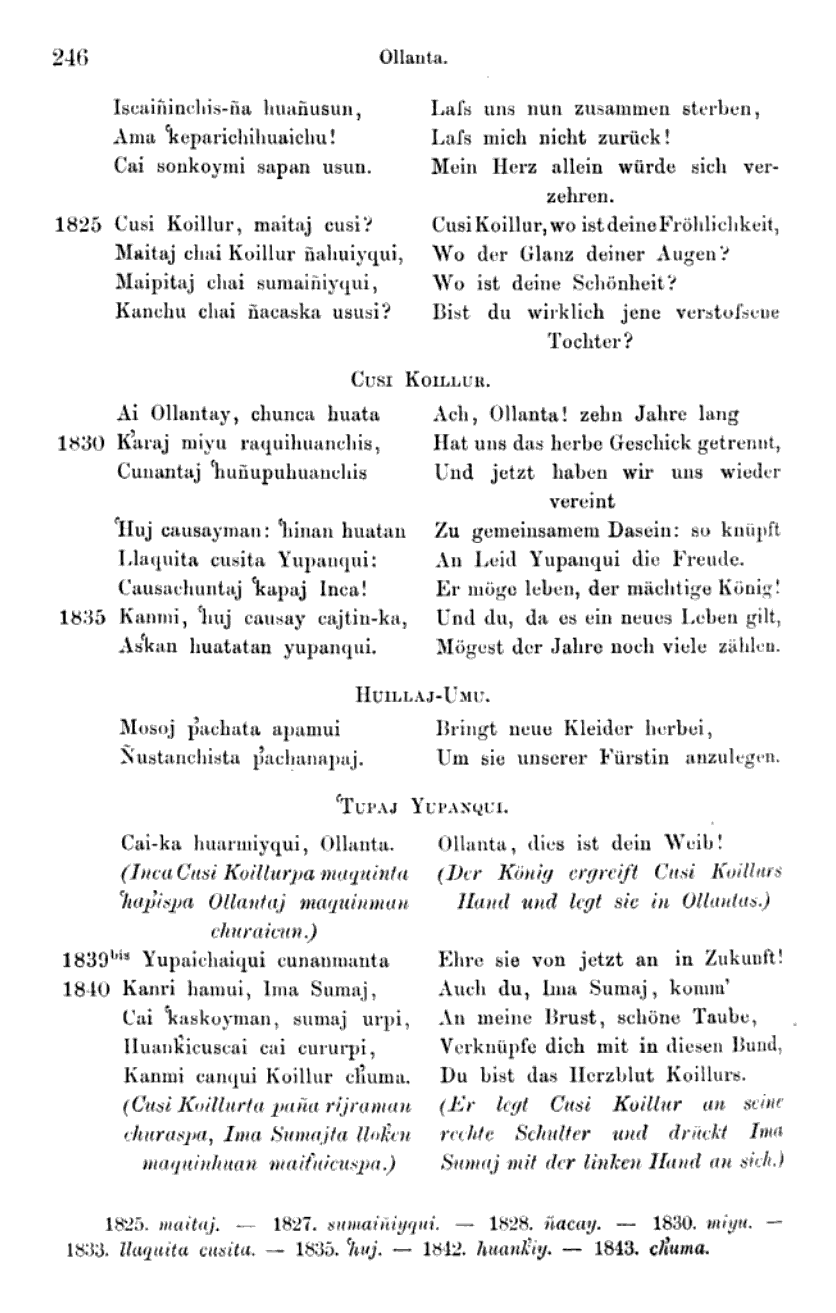
Drama Ollanta, edition of Ernst Middendorf, 1890, penultimate page

It was first assumed that Antonio Valdés, priest of Sicuani, was the author of Ollantay. English historian Clements R. Markham proposed this in the 19th century, and many others assumed it to be correct, including Dr. Raúl Porras Barrenechea. However, this theory of authorship has two major shortcomings:

1. there is no direct documentation indicating such an origin;
2. Valdés is not known to have written any other piece of literature or any other historical work. It seems more likely that this priest's contribution was limited to simply copying decaying manuscripts that he encountered in La Paz or other cities.

It was also suggested that the author was Justo Pastor Justiniani, but evidence later surfaced indicating that he served only as a copyist. Similarly, Juan Espinoza Medrano (a.k.a. El Lunarejo), a celebrated mestizo writer of the 17th century, was also considered a possible author. The lack of any documentary evidence supporting these possibilities has been taken to indicate a more likely pre-colonial origin for the play.

== Three hypotheses for its origin ==
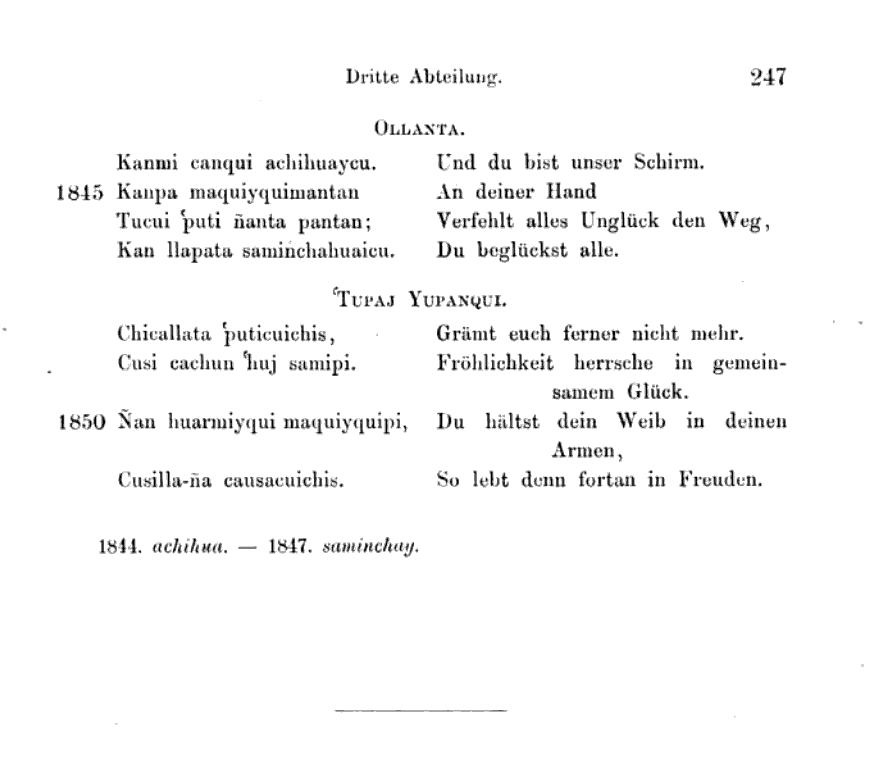
Drama Ollanta, edition of Ernst Middendorf, 1890, ending

Three hypotheses have emerged regarding the origin of Ollantay:

- Inca hypothesis:
- Hispanic hypothesis:
- Hispanic-Incan hypothesis:

== Copies ==
There are six original copies of this play. One is from around 1770 and attributed to the priest Antonio Valdés, and is held in the Convent of Santo Domingo in Cuzco, Peru. Two are believed to be derived from this one, written by Dr. Justo Pastor Justiniani and Justo Apu Sahuaraura Inca, and held in the General Archive of the Nation of Peru and the National Library of Peru, respectively. Two others are found in the Dominican Convent of Cuzco, and the third was published by Johann Jakob von Tschudi on the basis of a manuscript with origins in La Paz, Bolivia.

== Structure ==
Ollantay is divided into three acts. It is written predominantly in octosyllable verse alternating with hendecasyllable verse, and contains both blank verse and assonant rhyme.

== Plot summary ==
Ollanta; an ancient Peruvian Indian drama by Francis C. Wenrich (1920)

A general of the Inca armies, Ollantay is a warrior of common origin who has been decorated and elevated to the nobility in return for his service to the empire. He falls in love with Cusi Coyllur (or Kusi Quyllur, "happy star"), the daughter of the Inca ruler Pachacutec, but this love is prohibited due to his commoner background. Nevertheless, blinded by love, he pursues a secret relationship with Cusi Coyllur, a secret shared only with the Queen Ccoya Anahuarqui.

Despite ominous omens from the Inca high priest, Ollantay decides to ask the Inca king for his daughter's hand. Pachacutec, reminding Ollantay of his humble origins, reproaches Ollantay for his audacity and angrily expels him from the court. Cusi Coyllur is then imprisoned in the Acllahuasi ("house of chosen women") where she is to expiate her sins; there she gives birth to a baby girl, fruit of her love with Ollantay, that she names Ima Sumac ("how beautiful").

Ollantay, on learning that Cusi Coyllur is no longer in the palace, believes that she has been murdered and decides to leave the imperial capital Cusco together with his servant and confidant Piqui Chaqui ("flea foot"). He threatens to one day return and destroy Cusco, then flees to the city which carries his name, Ollantaytambo, where he and his followers arm themselves and prepare for battle.

The Inca ruler Pachacutec orders his general Rumi Nawi ("Stone-eyed") to gather forces and march to confront Ollantay. Ollantay sends his general Orqo Waranka ("A thousand mountains") to ambush Rumi Nawi in a mountain pass, defeating Rumi's forces but allowing him to escape. Other battles ensue. Ten years later Pachacutec dies without having defeated Ollantay, and his son Tupac Yupanqui succeeds him.

Meanwhile, in the Acllahuasi, Cusi Coyllur has endured hardship at the hands of Mama Caca ("Stone Mother") but also found an ally in Pitu Salla ("Twinned Love"), who has raised Cusi's daughter Ima Sumac as her own. When Ima accidentally discovers her true heritage, she proposes to go to the new Inca king and ask for clemency for her mother.

At the same time, new Inca ruler Tupac Yupanqui resolves to finally defeat and capture Ollantay, and sends Rumi Nawi, who promises to redeem his earlier failure. Rumi Nawi employs a deceptive plan: he presents himself at the gates of Ollantaytambo covered in wounds, pretending that the new Inca ruler has abused him and suggesting that he would like to join Ollantay's rebellion. When the gates are opened, Rumi Nawi's men capture Ollantay, Orqo Waranka, and other rebels without resistance, eventually bringing them to Cusco to face Tupac Yupanqui's judgement. After consultation with his advisors and his generals, Tupac condemns the prisoners to death, but then reverses himself at the last minute and not only pardons them, but decides to give them high-ranking posts in the empire. Ollantay is named the senior general and deputy of the Inca ruler, while Orqo Waranka is named ruler of the state of Antisuyu.

Soon afterwards, Ima Sumac enters the imperial palace to ask for clemency for her imprisoned mother. Although Tupac doesn't yet know who this is, he takes an interest in the case and together with Ollantay goes to the Acllahuasi. There they find a woman with very long hair and a ghostly appearance that Tupac finally recognizes as his sister in a moment of anagnorisis. Cusi Coyllur tells her story, and a magnanimous Tupac Yupanqui frees her and immediately gives her hand to Ollantay, ending the Inca drama on a happy note.
