= Closed U =

Letter of the Latin script

- Closed U

Usage
- Type: alphabetic
- Language of origin: Unifon; Quechua (formerly); Swedish Dialect Alphabet
- Sound values: /u/

History
Development
G43T3
        - Υυ
          - V
- Time period: 1878, 1960–present

Closed U ⟨⟩ is a letter of the Latin script. It has a form of the letter U closed above with a horizontal bar.

== Usage ==
Gavino Pacheco Zegarra used a closed U in his phonetic alphabet for writing the Quechua family of languages in the French translation of Ollantay published in 1878. It is also used in the Landsmålsalfabetet.

The Unifon alphabet uses a capital form of closed U.

== Computing codes ==
This letter has not yet been encoded in Unicode, but U+2A4C ⩌ CLOSED UNION WITH SERIFS resembles a closed U.
