= Raúl Porras Barrenechea Institute =

Research center and museum in Lima, Peru

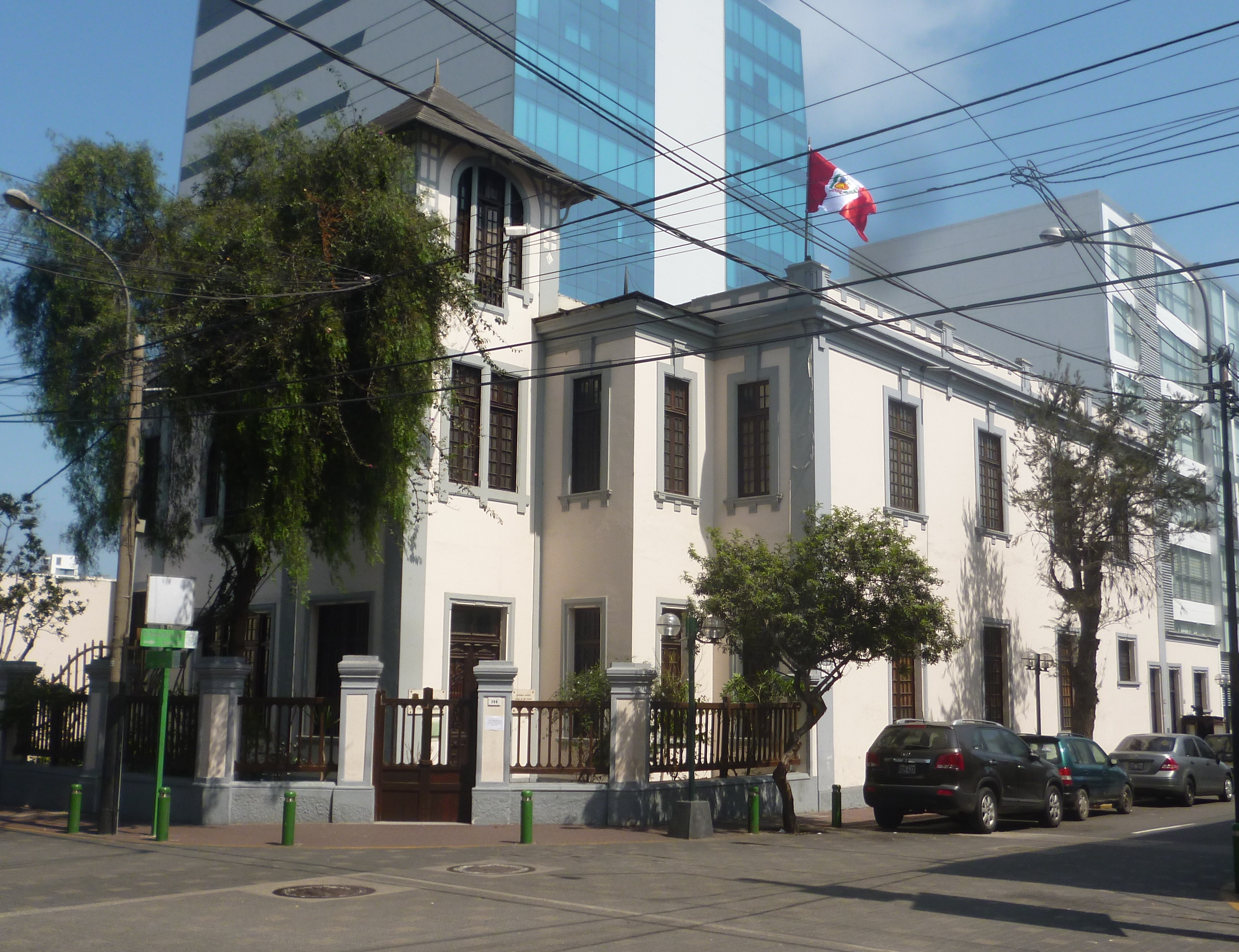
- Parent institution: National University of San Marcos
- Established: 20 December 1964
- President: Amb. Félix Álvarez Brun
- Director: Amb. Harry Belevan-McBride
- Address: Calle Narciso de la Colina N° 398, Miraflores
- Location: Lima, Peru
- Coordinates: 12°07′06″S 77°01′36″W
- Interactive map of Raúl Porras Barrenechea Institute
- Website: www.institutoraulporras.org

The Raúl Porras Barrenechea Institute of the National University of San Marcos (IRPB-UNMSM) was founded in 1964 by the University of San Marcos in honor of the distinguished alum, Peruvian historian and diplomat Raúl Porras Barrenechea. The institute acts as a Center for Higher Studies and Peruvian Research, developing and promoting research mainly related to the areas of humanities, arts and social sciences. To this end, the institute offers researchers and the general public a library specialized in the mentioned fields.

The institute also is responsible for a historic house museum dedicated to Raúl Porras Barrenechea and declared a "Historical and Artistic Monument" and "Cultural heritage of Peru" in 1980. The location preserves and permanently exhibits works of art, furniture, paintings, sculptures, photographs, family and personal memories of Porras Barrenechea; the Archivo Porras; and the museum of Peruvian writers. It is located in the Miraflores district and is a neighbor of the historic house museum Ricardo Palma, which allows it to develop fully the purpose for which it was founded, being one of the centers of the cultural activity in the country. The house-museum is also the final and most important point of a literary route commemorating Mario Vargas Llosa, one of the winners of the international competition Walking Visionaires Awards organized by Walk21Vienna in 2015.

The building of the current institute has been for decades one of the leading intellectual lights of Lima, both during the life and after the death of professor Porras Barrenechea. Among the Peruvian intellectuals who have had a significant connection with the house of Porras Barrenechea are: Mario Vargas Llosa, Pablo Macera, Carlos Araníbar, Luis Jaime Cisneros, Hugo Neira, Jorge Basadre, Raúl Ferrero Rebagliati, Félix Álvarez Brun, Jorge Puccinelli, Carlos Alzamora, Miguel Maticorena, René Hooper, Antonio Garrido Aranda, Emilio Vásquez, Luis Loayza, María Rostworowski, and Waldemar Espinoza.
