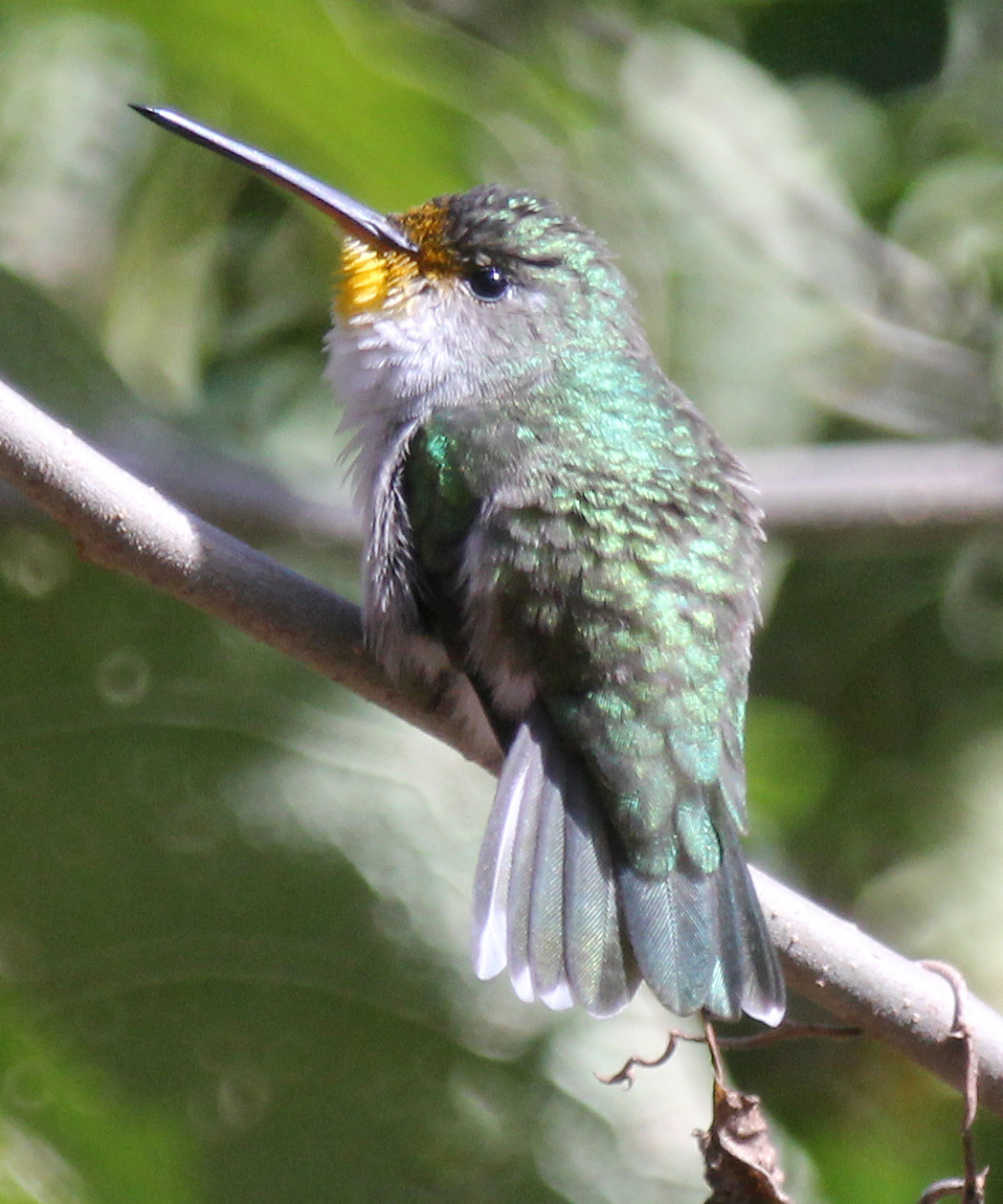

Conservation status
- Least Concern (IUCN 3.1)
- CITES Appendix II

Scientific classification
- Kingdom: Animalia
- Phylum: Chordata
- Class: Aves
- Order: Apodiformes
- Family: Trochilidae
- Genus: Elliotomyia
- Species: E. chionogaster

Binomial name
- Elliotomyia chionogaster (Tschudi, 1846)

Synonyms
- Leucippus chionogaster; Elliotia chionogaster; Amazilia chionogaster

= White-bellied hummingbird =

Species of bird

The white-bellied hummingbird (Elliotomyia chionogaster) is a species of hummingbird in the "emeralds", tribe Trochilini of subfamily Trochilinae. It is found in Argentina, Bolivia, Brazil, and Peru.

== Taxonomy and systematics ==
The white-bellied hummingbird has at various times been placed in genera Leucippus and Elliotia, and until 2014 in Amazilia. A molecular phylogenetic study published in 2014 found that Amazilia was polyphyletic. In the revised classification to create monophyletic genera, the white-bellied hummingbird was placed by most taxonomic systems in a new genus Elliotomyia. However, BirdLife International's Handbook of the Birds of the World (HBW) retains it in Amazilia.

The white-bellied hummingbird shares genus Elliotomyia with the green-and-white hummingbird (E. viridicauda). It has two subspecies, the nominate E. c. chionogaster and E. c. hypoleuca.

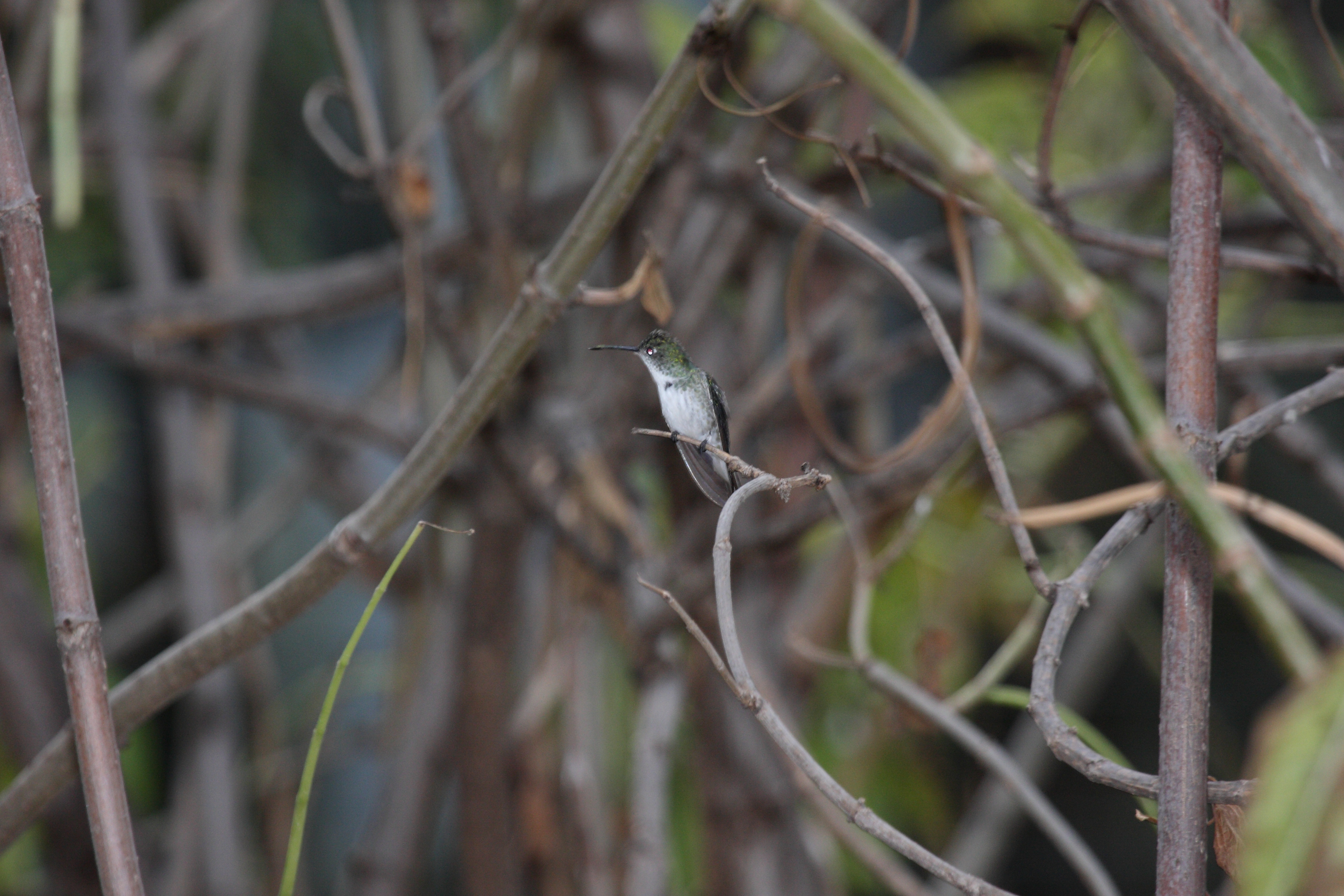
White-bellied hummingbird in Peru

== Description ==
The white-bellied hummingbird is 9 to 12 cm (3.5 to 4.7 in) long. Males weigh 4.9 to 6.7 g (0.17 to 0.24 oz) and females 4.5 to 6 g (0.16 to 0.21 oz). Both sexes of both subspecies have a medium length straight bill with a blackish maxilla and a reddish mandible with a dark tip. Adult males of the nominate subspecies have brilliant light green upperparts, sides, and chest. Their undersides are whitish from the chin to the undertail coverts with golden-green spots on the sides of the throat and sometimes some green on the coverts. Their tail feathers are brilliant grayish green to golden green; the outer ones have white inner webs. Adult females are very similar to males, but with a light cream chin and throat that are more heavily spotted. Juveniles are similar to adult females with the cream of the throat extending to the belly.

Both sexes of subspecies E. c. hypoleuca have creamy rather than white underparts and the white of the outer tail feather webs is reduced. Females also have white ends to the outer three pairs of tail feathers.

== Distribution and habitat ==
The nominate subspecies of white-bellied hummingbird is found on the east slope of the Peruvian Andes between the departments of Amazonas and Cuzco. E. c. hypoleuca is found on the east slope from Puno Department in far southeastern Peru south through Bolivia into northwestern Argentina to La Rioja Province and east into the Brazilian state of Mato Grosso. The species inhabits semi-open landscapes such as forest edges, secondary forest, shrublands, cerrado, plantations, and gardens. It favors relatively dry areas having Cactaceae, Agave, or groves of Alnus or Eucalyptus. In elevation it is found mostly between 450 and 2,000 m (1,500 and 6,600 ft) and occasionally as high as 2,800 m (9,200 ft).

== Behavior ==
=== Movement ===
The white-bellied hummingbird is generally sedentary though some local dispersal has been noted in Argentina.

=== Feeding ===
The white-bellied hummingbird forages for nectar at a wide variety of flowering plants, shrubs, and trees. Species of at least eight families have been documented as sources. In addition to nectar it feeds on small insects.

=== Breeding ===
The white-bellied hummingbird's breeding season spans from January to March. It makes a cup nest of plant wool and moss with lichens on the outside and typically places it in a shrub or small tree between 2 and 5 m (7 and 20 ft) above the ground. The female incubates the clutch of two eggs for 14 to 15 days and fledging occurs 19 to 22 days after hatch.

=== Vocalization ===
The song of the nominate white-bellied hummingbird subspecies is "a repeated short phrase typically comprising three squeaky notes, 'tseet-chew-chip … tseet-chew-chip …'." That of E. c. hypoleuca is "a series of single high-pitched, penetrating 'pseek' notes, occasionally followed by a lower-pitched, faster 'tsi-tsi-tsi-tsi'." Calls of both subspecies include "a high-pitched 'seeek' and a descending stuttering series."

== Status ==
The IUCN has assessed the white-bellied hummingbird as being of Least Concern. It has a large range but its population size and trend are not known. No immediate threats have been identified. It is considered locally common. It might be threatened by habitat conversion to grazing land, especially in the more arid parts of its range.
