= Pablo Macera =

Peruvian historian (1929–2020)

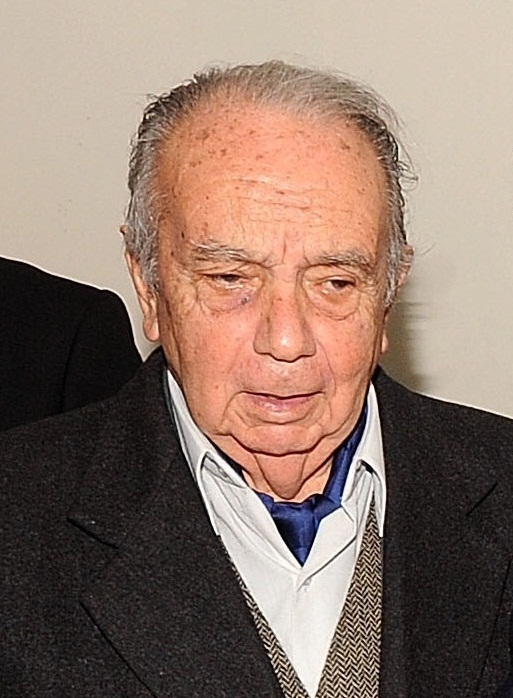
- Born: Pablo Andrés Macera Dall'Orso; 19 December 1929; Huacho, Peru
- Died: 9 January 2020 (aged 90); Lima, Peru
- Education: National University of San Marcos
- Occupation: Historian

Pablo Macera (19 December 1929 – 9 January 2020) was a Peruvian historian.

== Biography ==
Pablo Macera did his primary studies at La Salle School where he already felt a predilection for the History course. His secondary education was made at the Hipólito Unanue School.

At 16 he entered the Faculty of Letters and Law of the National University of San Marcos, later change his career for History. He graduated as a bachelor in 1960 with the thesis "Ensayos sobre el siglo XVIII en el Perú (cultura y economía)" and in France, as a doctor in 1962, with the thesis "La imagen francesa del Perú (siglos XVI -XIX)".

He is the founder of the Andean Rural History Seminar, an institute belonging to the National University of San Marcos, of which he would be appointed professor emeritus.

He was president of the Patronato Nacional de Arqueología and professor at various universities. He was elected congressman of the Republic in the year 2000.

He donated his personal library to the National Library of Peru at the end of April 2015. His collection is made up of more than 34 thousand titles. The donation also includes an archive of more than one thousand manuscripts from the viceregal era and the War of the Pacific.

Macera died on January 9, 2020, at age 90. His remains were veiled in the Casona of the National University of San Marcos, in Lima.

== Works ==
- Tres etapas en el desarrollo de la conciencia nacional (1956)
- Historia del petróleo peruano (1963)
- Lenguaje y modernismo peruano del siglo XVIII (1963)
- Instrucciones para el manejo de las haciendas jesuitas del Perú: ss. XVII-XVIII (1966)
- Mapas coloniales de haciendas cuzqueñas (1968)
- Bosquejo de la historia económica del Perú (1970)
- Feudalismo colonial americano: el caso de las haciendas peruanas (1971)
- Cayaltí 1875-1920: organización del trabajo en una plantación azucarera del Perú (1973)
- Las plantaciones azucareras en el Perú: 1821-1875 (1974)
- Conversaciones con Basadre (1974)
- Retrato de Túpac Amaru (1975)
- La imagen francesa del Perú, siglos XVI-XIX (1976)
- Agricultura en el Perú, S.XX: documentos. Tres tomos (1977)
- Trabajos de historia. Cuatro tomos (1977-1978)
- Visión histórica del Perú: del paleolítico al proceso de 1968 (1979)
- Pintores populares andinos (1979)
- Arte y lucha social: los murales de Ambaná (Bolivia) (1983)
- Las furias y las penas (1983)
- El Paraguay colonial, siglos XVIII-XIX (1988)
- Mojos y chiquitos (1988)
- Rebelión india (1988)
- Geografía colonial de Arequipa (1989)
- Los precios del Perú colonial, siglos XVI-XIX: fuentes. Tres tomos (1992)
- Santero y caminante: santoruraj-ñampurej (1992, in collaboration with Jesús Urbano Rojas)
- La pintura mural andina: siglos XVI-XIX (1993)
- Cuentos pintados del ande y la amazonía (1996)
- Centenario de Don Joaquín López Antay (1997)
- La ciudad y el tiempo: Pisco, Porras y Valdelomar (1999, in collaboration with Waldemar Espinoza y Ricardo Silva-Santisteban)
- Viajeros franceses: siglos XVI-XIX (1999)
- Nueva Crónica del Perú siglo XX (2000, in collaboration with Santiago Forns).
- Patrimonio Cultural del Perú. Dos tomos (2000)
- Parlamento y sociedad en el Perú. Bases documentales siglo XIX. Ocho Tomos (1998-2000)
  - Tomo I: Geografía política de la costa peruana (costa norte, centro y sur) 1822-1860
  - Tomo II: Geografía política de la sierra peruana (sierra norte, centro y sur) 1822-1860
  - Tomo III: Geografía política de la Amazonía (colonización y comunicaciones)
  - Tomo IV: Geografía política de la Amazonía (demarcación e informes socioeconómicos)
  - Tomo V: Geografía política de la costa peruana (costa norte, centro y sur) 1861-1899
  - Tomo VI: Geografía política de la sierra norte 1861-1899
  - Tomo VII: Geografía política de la sierra centro 1861-1899
  - Tomo VIII: Geografía política de la sierra sur 1861-1899
- Los centros de innovación tecnológica: ley y reglamento (2000)
- Emprendedores populares: diálogo Pablo Macera y Javier Tantaleán Arbulú (2001)
- Los dueños del mundo Shipibo (2004)
- El Inca colonial (2006)
- Túpac Amaru, San Isidro, Pentecostés (2007)
- El poder libre asháninca: Juan Santos Atahualpa y su hijo Josecito (2009, in collaboration with Enrique Casanto)
- Trincheras y fronteras del arte popular peruano (2009)
- La cocina mágica asháninca (2011, in collaboration with Enrique Casanto)
- Arrogante montonero: Armando Villanueva y Pablo Macera, conversaciones (2011)
- Escuela de obediencia y memoria del Inca, 1743-1818 (2013, in collaboration with Manuel Burga Díaz)
- Comida ambulante: ofertas gastronómicas de Lima Norte (2014)
- La comida popular ambulante: de antaño y hogaño en Lima (2015, in collaboration with María Belén Soria)
