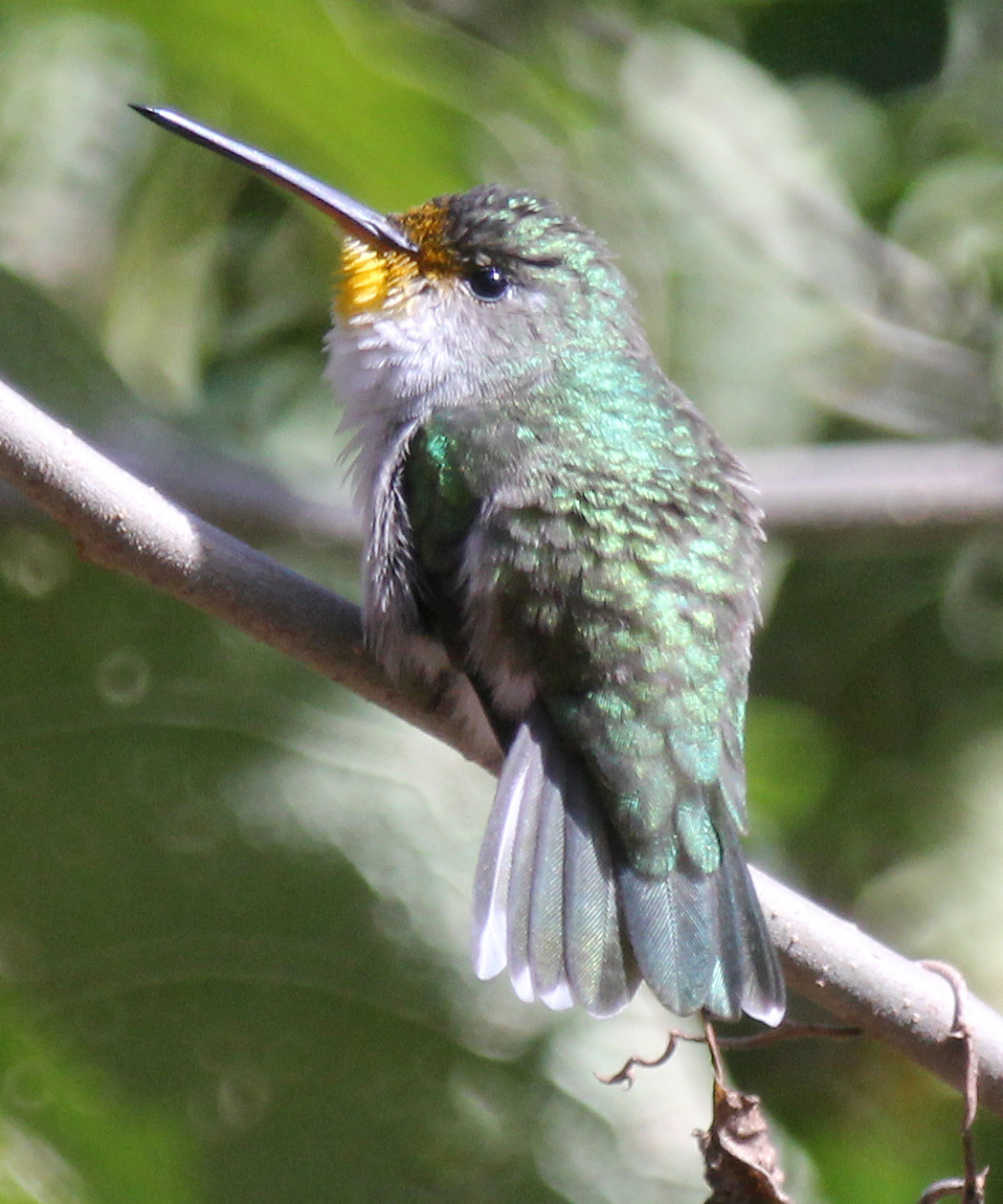
- White-bellied hummingbird, (Elliotomyia chionogaster)

Scientific classification
- Kingdom: Animalia
- Phylum: Chordata
- Class: Aves
- Clade: Strisores
- Order: Apodiformes
- Family: Trochilidae
- Tribe: Trochilini
- Genus: Elliotomyia; Stiles & Remsen, 2019

Species
- 2, see text

= Elliotomyia =

Genus of birds

Elliotomyia is a genus in the family of Hummingbirds.

== Species ==
The genus contains two species:

Genus Elliotomyia – Stiles & Remsen, 2019 – two species
Common name	Scientific name and subspecies	Range	Size and ecology	IUCN status and estimated population
White-bellied hummingbird	Elliotomyia chionogaster (Tschudi, 1846) Two subspecies: E. c. chionogaster; E. c. hypoleuca	Argentina, Bolivia, Brazil, and Peru	Size: Habitat: Diet:	LC
Green-and-white hummingbird	Elliotomyia viridicauda (von Berlepsch, 1883)	Peru	Size: Habitat: Diet:	LC

These species were formerly placed in the genus Amazilia. A molecular phylogenetic study published in 2014 found that Amazilia was polyphyletic. In the revised classification to create monophyletic genera, the white-bellied hummingbird and the green-and-white hummingbird were placed in a new genus Elliotomyia.
