= Antigüedades peruanas =

1851 book by Mariano Eduardo de Rivero y Ustáriz

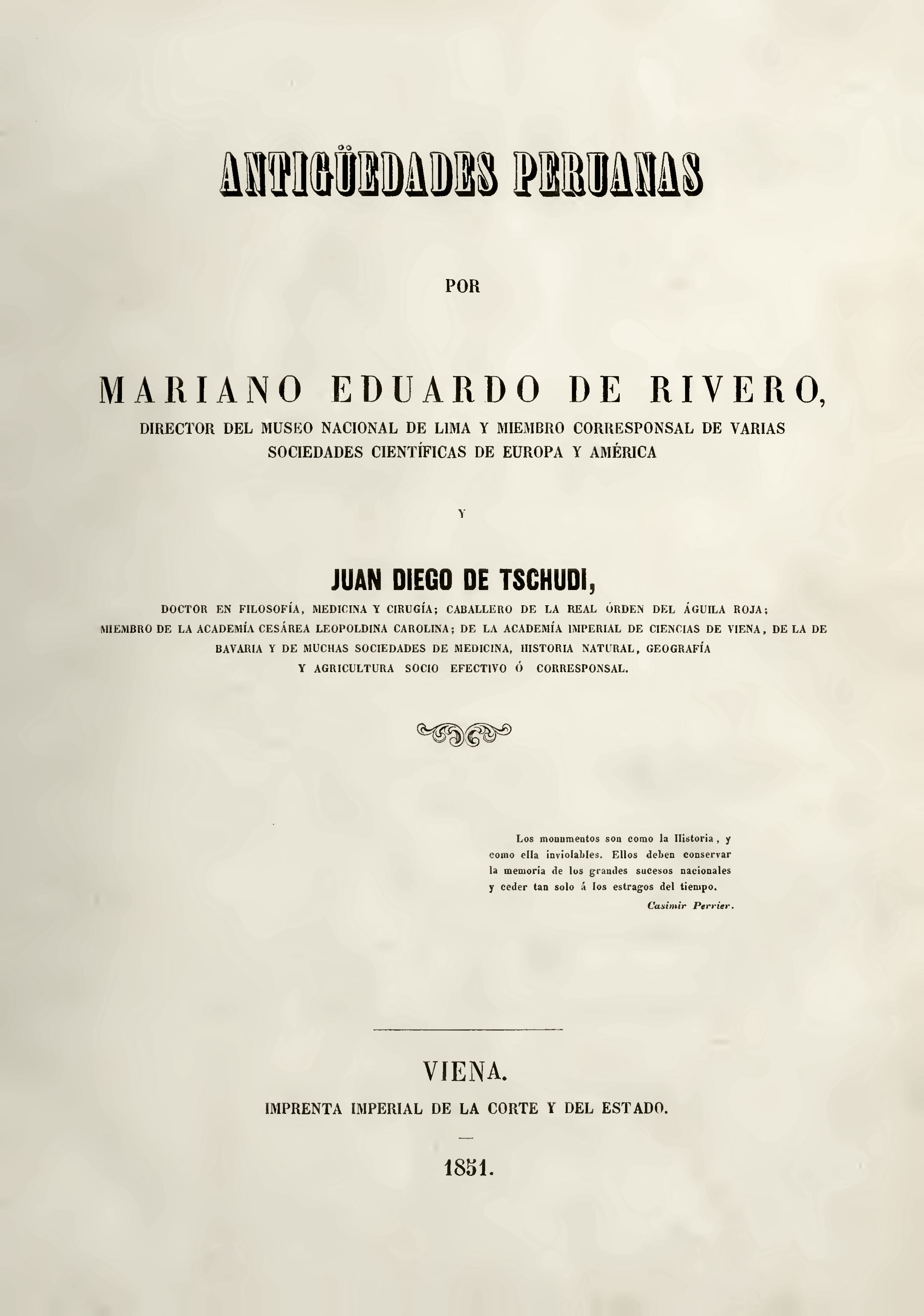
- Title page of the text volume
- Author: Mariano Eduardo de Rivero y Ustáriz
- Language: Spanish
- Subject: Peruvian antiquities; archaeology
- Publisher: Imprenta Imperial de la Corte y del Estado
- Publication date: 1851
- Publication place: Vienna
- OCLC: 954238720

Antigüedades peruanas (transl. Peruvian Antiquities) is an 1851 archaeological study of pre-Columbian Peru by Mariano Eduardo de Rivero y Ustáriz, with contributions from Johann Jakob von Tschudi, (Note: The work credits Johann Jakob von Tschudi as Juan Diego de Tschudi.) published in Vienna as a quarto text volume with an accompanying folio of plates.

It is the first scientific work on Peruvian archaeology. Historian Raúl Porras Barrenechea wrote that it created interest in archaeological research in Peru in the nineteenth century.

== Background ==
Rivero (1798–1857) was a Peruvian mining engineer and founding director of Colombia and Peru's national museums. He first wrote about Peruvian antiquities for the journal Memorial de ciencias naturales y de industria nacional y extranjera (transl. Journal of Natural Sciences and of National and Foreign Industry) in 1828.

Rivero published a work titled Antigüedades peruanas in 1841. Swiss naturalist Tschudi (1818–1889) collaborated with Rivero on an expanded 1851 edition, published in Vienna by the Imprenta Imperial de la Corte y del Estado. This edition was printed as a quarto text volume of 342 pages with an accompanying folio of plates.

In 1853, translations in English (by Francis L. Hawks) and French were published.

== Description ==
The book has ten chapters, which cover pre-Columbian transoceanic contact, the earliest inhabitants of Peru, Peruvian history before the arrival of the Spanish, Inca government and political institutions, the Quechua language, Incan science, the Inca religious system, religious customs, the state of the arts among the ancient Peruvians, and monuments.

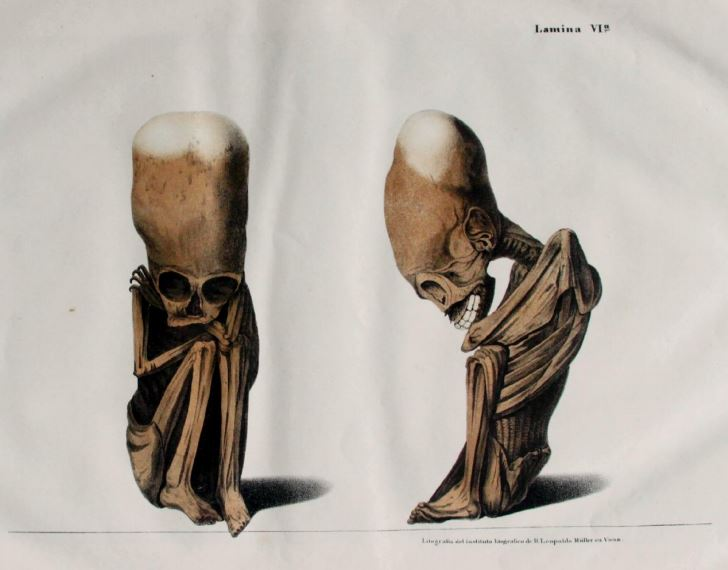
A fetus with an elongated skull, illustrated in the folio

Its folio has 58 plates, many in color; the first six depict mummies and skulls attributed to different races. In his analysis of ancient Peruvian skulls, Tschudi concluded that three distinct races had inhabited the country before the rise of the Incas. He argued that most Peruvian skull shapes were natural rather than products of artificial cranial deformation.

The frontispiece to the folio depicts the Gate of the Sun at Tiahuanaco in present-day Bolivia, the site where Rivero, like many others at the time, believed Peruvian civilization had begun. The fourteen portraits of Inca rulers on the frontispiece were copied from a plate in Jorge Juan and Antonio de Ulloa's Relación histórica del viaje a la América meridional (transl. Historical Account of the Voyage to South America) (1748).

== Authorship ==
The work's authorship often has been credited solely to Tschudi. However, Tschudi's prologue credits it to Rivero, and Tschudi claimed to have written only chapters II and V, on the earliest inhabitants of Peru and the Quechua language, respectively. Porras also identified Rivero as the author.

== Legacy ==
In 2018, the book was displayed at the Lima Art Museum in the exhibition "El Perú ilustrado. Martínez Compañón y su legado" (transl. "The Illustrated Peru: Martínez Compañón and His Legacy"), as one of the contextual works accompanying Martínez Compañón's watercolors.
