= Justo Sahuaraura Inca =

Justo Apu Sahuaraura Inca
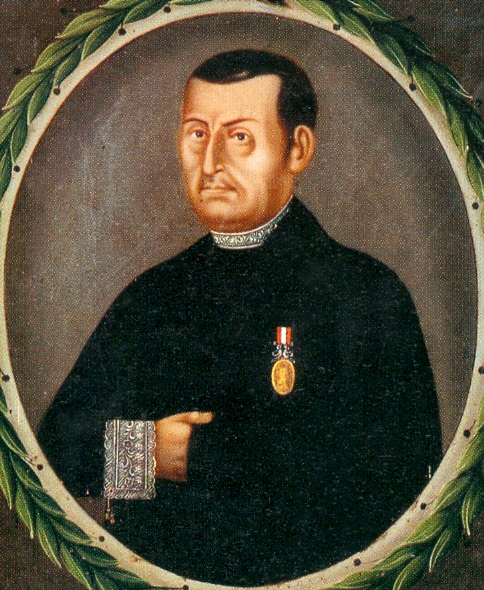
- Born: c. 1770
- Education: National University of Saint Anthony the Abbot in Cuzco

Justo Apu Sahuaraura Inca (Cusco, c. 1770 – Canas, ?) was an Incan noble and a leader of Peruvian independence. He was the son of Pedro Sahuaraura Tito Atauchi, chief of the Quispicanchi, a descendant of Paullu Inca and, through him, a descendant of Huayna Cápac.

He began his studies at the College of San Francisco de Borja and continued them at the College of San Bernardo. He went to the National University of Saint Anthony the Abbot in Cuzco, where he studied theology and canon law. After joining the clergy, he was the interim priest of Coaza (Carabaya), and for five years he was the head of doctrine in the district of Pachaconas (Antabamba). He graduated with a doctorate in 1808, was named the synodal examiner of the bishopric and general visitor of six provinces, and was assigned to the parish of Soraya (Aymaraes), in 1810.

At the beginning of the Cuzco Rebellion of 1814 led by Brigadier Mateo Pumacahua, he gave his assets to the cause, although when the royal authority was restored, they were set on fire by order of Colonel Vicente González. Under pressure and subjected to multiple humiliations, he was finally released and returned to his curate.

Back home he met Simon Bolívar, who recognized his merits and awarded him a civic medal. Named canon treasurer of the diocesan council of Cuzco (1825), he would be elected deputy by Aymaraes (1826). In January 1825 he was part of the Qualification Board established in Cusco by Simón Bolívar to distribute jobs among citizens qualified by their integrity, ability and service. This effort was led by Benito Laso and included Agustín Cosío, Toribio Salas, Juan de Mata Chacón y Becerra, Justo Sahuaraura, José Feijoó, Juan Béjar, Bartolomé Arregui and Martín Gavino Concha.

Embittered by the treatment he received, he retired to the town of Canas. In his last years he wrote his memoirs and documented his family archives, ultimately publishing "Memories of the Peruvian Monarchy or outline of the history of the Incas" (Paris, 1850). He left manuscripts in an Anthology of Inca Literature, among which was the codex of the Ollantay drama, copied around 1838 from a manuscript owned by the priest Antonio Valdes.

His manuscript of "Memories of the Peruvian Monarchy" was stolen from Peru's National Library during the Chilean occupation of Lima from 1881–83. It was returned to Peru in November 2019 and unveiled in February 2020.
