= Waldemar Espinoza Soriano =

Peruvian historian (1936–2025)

- Born: 6 July 1936; Cajamarca, Peru
- Died: 31 August 2025 (aged 89); Lima, Peru

Academic background
- Education: National University of San Marcos

Academic work
- Discipline: Historian
- Sub-discipline: Andean ethnohistory

Waldemar del Socorro Espinoza Soriano (6 July 1936 – 31 August 2025) was a Peruvian historian, ethnologist, and professor. A specialist in Andean ethnohistory, he taught for more than four decades at the National University of San Marcos, where he was later named professor emeritus. Espinoza authored over thirty books and more than 200 scholarly articles; his most influential works include Los incas: economía, sociedad y Estado en la era del Tawantinsuyo (1987), La destrucción del imperio de los incas (1973), and Virreinato peruano: vida cotidiana, instituciones y cultura (1997). In 2024, ten of his works were declared Cultural Heritage of the Nation by the Peruvian Ministry of Culture.

== Early life and education ==
Espinoza was born in Cajamarca on 6 June 1936. He completed his secondary studies at the Colegio Nacional San Ramón in his hometown (1948–1952), where he began writing about local myths and legends.

In 1953, Espinoza entered the National University of San Marcos (UNMSM), studying alongside Mario Vargas Llosa, José María Arguedas, Pablo Macera, and Luis Guillermo Lumbreras. He was a student of Raúl Porras Barrenechea and Luis E. Valcárcel, and obtained his bachelor’s degree with a thesis titled Rebeliones indígenas y mestizos en la sierra septentrional del Perú (1756-1821) ("Indigenous and Mestizo Rebellions in the Northern Highlands of Peru (1756–1821)"). He later earned a doctorate in Humanities with a specialization in history.

== Career ==
Espinoza received a scholarship from the Institute of Hispanic Culture to conduct research at the General Archive of the Indies in Seville, Spain. He was also supported by the Guggenheim Foundation in New York, which enabled him to continue research in archives in Peru, Bolivia, and Argentina. The Organization of American States (OAS) likewise supported his studies on the history of the Cayambe and Carangue peoples.

Over a teaching career spanning more than four decades, Espinoza taught at the National University of San Marcos, where he emphasized archival research and ethnohistorical methods. His best-known work, Los incas: economía, sociedad y estado en la era del Tawantinsuyu (1987), is regarded as a key text for understanding Inca political, social, and economic organization.

Espinoza’s research focused on the history of the diverse ethnic groups of the Inca Empire (Tawantinsuyu) and colonial Peru, examining their social, political, economic, religious, and cultural structures. He identified the Visita hecha a la provincia de Chucuito (1567) by Garci Diez de San Miguel, a document regarded as central to the study of Andean organization and frequently cited in connection with John Murra's "vertical archipelago" theory of ecological control. In 2000, it was listed by Caretas and the Pontifical Catholic University of Peru among the "50 books every cultured Peruvian should read," alongside La destrucción del imperio de los incas (1973), also noted for its academic impact and wide readership.

Espinoza donated between 80,000 and 90,000 volumes from his personal collection to the Pedro Zulen Central Library of UNMSM. The donation included Peruvian and European works, with some editions dating back to the sixteenth and seventeenth centuries, collected over the course of five decades.

=== Works declared Cultural Heritage ===
In 2024, the Ministry of Culture of Peru, acting on a proposal from the National Library, declared ten of Espinoza’s works Cultural Heritage of the Nation. These included Rebeliones y alborotos indígenas y mestizos en la sierra septentrional del Perú Virreynal ("Indigenous and Mestizo Rebellions and Uprisings in the Northern Highlands of Colonial Peru"), El alcalde mayor indígena en el Virreinato del Perú ("The Indigenous Chief Magistrate in the Viceroyalty of Peru"), Los Huancas, aliados de la conquista ("The Huancas: Allies of the Conquest"), La destrucción del imperio de los incas, y Virreinato peruano: vida cotidiana, instituciones y cultura ("The Destruction of the Inca Empire, and Peruvian Viceroyalty: Daily Life, Institutions, and Culture"). Published between 1957 and 1997, these texts are considered key reference works for the study of Andean history.

== Awards and recognitions ==
In 1988, the Spanish Numismatic Association awarded Espinoza the Javier Conde Garriga Award for the best book on the history of currency.

In 1990, Espinoza was awarded the Order of the Palmas Magisteriales in the grade of Maestro by the Ministry of Education.

In 2018, Espinoza was named professor emeritus by the National University of San Marcos, in recognition of his academic contributions.

== Death ==
Espinoza Soriano died on 31 August 2025, at the age of 89.

== Selected works ==
The following works by Waldemar Espinoza Soriano were declared Cultural Heritage of the Nation:

- Rebeliones y alborotos indígenas y mestizos en la sierra septentrional del Perú Virreynal (1756-1821) (1957)
- El alcalde mayor indígena en el Virreinato del Perú (1960)
- Los Incas: economía, sociedad y estado en la era del Tahuantinsuyo (1987)
- Los Huancas, aliados de la conquista: tres informaciones inéditas sobre la participación indígena en la conquista del Perú, 1558, 1560, 1561 (1971)
- La destrucción del imperio de los Incas: la rivalidad política y señorial de los curacazgos andinos (1973)
- Los Incas (1987)
- Artesanos, transacciones, monedas y formas de pago en el mundo andino. Siglos XV y XVI (1987) – Tomos I y II
- Visita hecha a la provincia de Chucuito por Garci Diez de San Miguel en el año 1567 (1964)
- Virreinato peruano: vida cotidiana, instituciones y cultura (1997)
