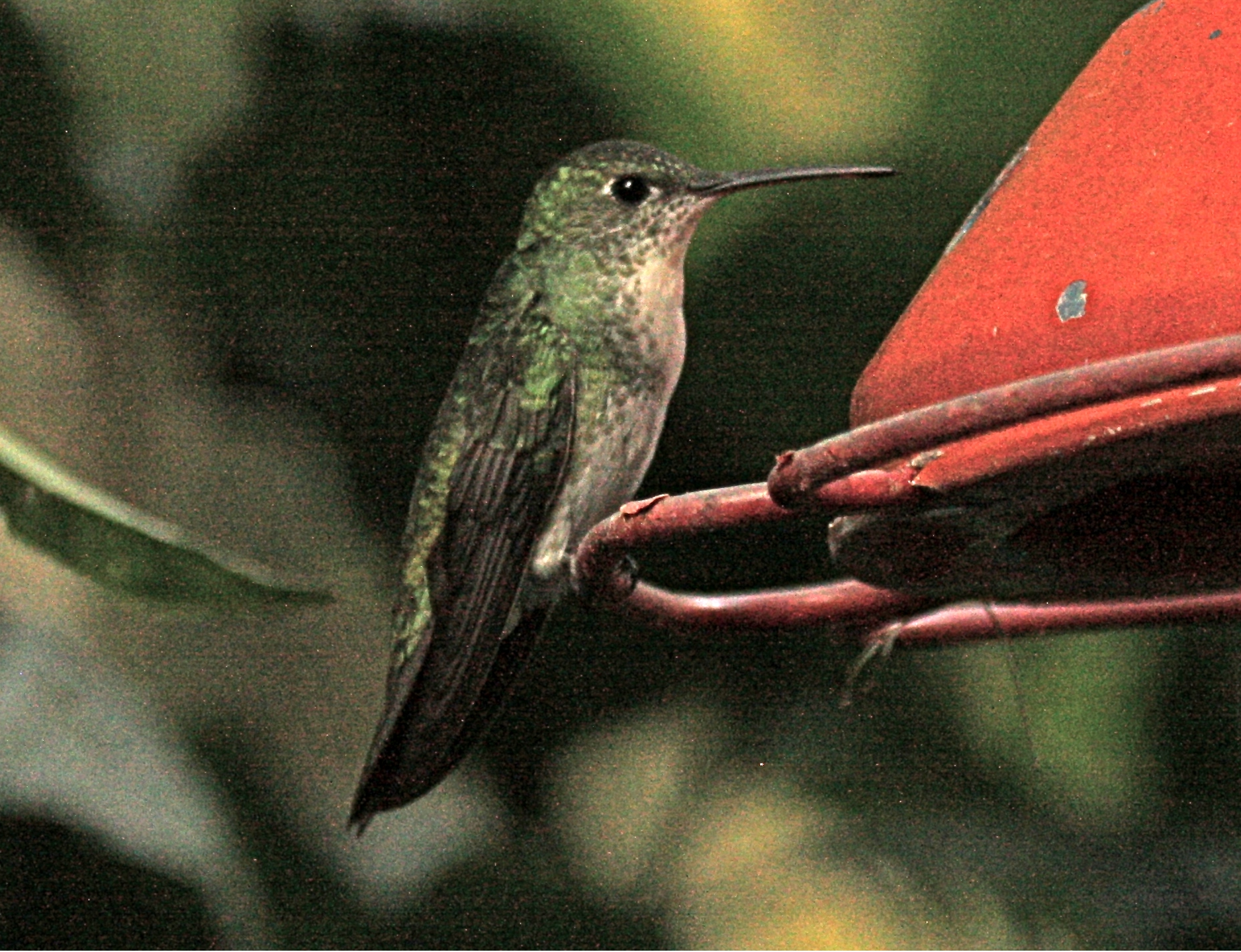

Conservation status
- Least Concern (IUCN 3.1)
- CITES Appendix II

Scientific classification
- Kingdom: Animalia
- Phylum: Chordata
- Class: Aves
- Order: Apodiformes
- Family: Trochilidae
- Genus: Elliotomyia
- Species: E. viridicauda

Binomial name
- Elliotomyia viridicauda (von Berlepsch, 1883)

Synonyms
- Leucippus viridicaudus; Elliotia viridicauda; Amazilia viridicauda

= Green-and-white hummingbird =

Species of bird

The green-and-white hummingbird (Elliotomyia viridicauda) is a species of hummingbird in the "emeralds", tribe Trochilini of subfamily Trochilinae. It is endemic to Peru.

== Taxonomy and systematics ==
The green-and-white hummingbird has at various times been placed in genera Leucippus and Elliotia, and until 2014 in Amazilia. A molecular phylogenetic study published in 2014 found that Amazilia was polyphyletic. In the revised classification to create monophyletic genera, the green-and-white hummingbird was placed by most taxonomic systems in a new genus Elliotomyia. However, BirdLife International's Handbook of the Birds of the World (HBW) retains it in Amazilia.

The green-and-white hummingbird shares genus Elliotomyia with the white-bellied hummingbird (E. chionogaster). It is monotypic.

== Description ==
The green-and-white hummingbird is 10 to 11 cm (3.9 to 4.3 in) long. Males weigh about 6.0 g (0.21 oz) and females about 5.5 g (0.19 oz). Both sexes have a medium length straight bill with a blackish maxilla and a reddish mandible with a dark tip. Adult males have brilliant green to bronze-green upperparts and flanks. Their undersides are whitish from the chin to the undertail coverts with greenish spots on the sides of the chin and throat and sometimes some golden-green on the coverts. Their tail is grayish green to golden green. Adult females are very similar to males, but with a light cream chin and throat that are more heavily spotted. Juveniles are similar to adult females with the cream of the throat extending to the belly.

== Distribution and habitat ==
The green-and-white hummingbird is found on the east slope of the Peruvian Andes discontinuously from Huánuco Department south to Cuzco, including at Machu Picchu. It inhabits the edges and clearings of mature subtropical forest and also secondary forest between the elevations of 1,000 and 2,500 m (3,300 and 8,200 ft).

== Behavior ==
=== Movement ===
The green-and-white hummingbird is generally sedentary though some local dispersal is probable.

=== Feeding ===
The white-bellied hummingbird forages for nectar at a variety of flowering plants, shrubs, and trees, though its diet is not known in detail. In addition to nectar it feeds on small arthropods.

=== Breeding ===
The white-bellied hummingbird's full breeding season has not been determined, but it is known to include January. It makes a cup nest of plant wool bound by spiderweb with lichen on the outside, and often places it on a horizontal branch of a small tree. The incubation period and time to fledging are not known.

=== Vocalization ===
The green-and-white hummingbird's song is "a repeated short phrase of typically three squeaky notes, 'tseet-chew-chip … tseet-chew-chip ...'." Its call is "two rising high-pitched notes followed by a descending stuttering series, 'tsee-tseeet-tsi-tsi-tsi-tsi'." Both are very similar to those of its close relative the white-bellied hummingbird.

== Status ==
The IUCN has assessed the green-and-white hummingbird as being of Least Concern, though its population size and trend are unknown. No immediate threats have been identified. It has a restricted range but is fairly common in Pasco Department and the Machu Picchu area. "[F]urther field studies are needed to clarify the type of conservation measures required for this species."
