= O with low ring inside =

Swedish dialect alphabet symbol

O with low ring ⟨ⱺ⟩

ⱺ, or o with low ring inside, is a phonetic character from the Landsmålsalfabetet, a phonetic alphabet for the transcription of Swedish dialects. It is used to represent a mid rounded back vowel [o̞].

Character information
| Preview | ⱺ | |
|---|---|---|
| Unicode name | LATIN SMALL LETTER O WITH LOW RING INSIDE | |
| Encodings | decimal | hex |
| Unicode | 11386 | U+2C7A |
| UTF-8 | 226 177 186 | E2 B1 BA |
| Numeric character reference | &#11386; | &#x2C7A; |
