= Mariano Eduardo de Rivero y Ustáriz =

Peruvian scientist, politician, and diplomat (1798–1857)

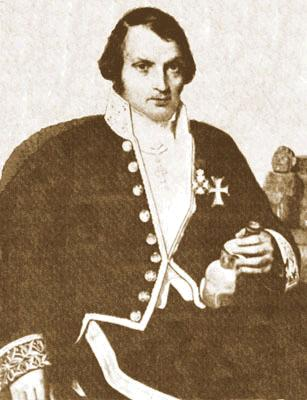
- Rivero y Ustáriz in an undated portrait
- Born: 22 October 1798; Arequipa, Viceroyalty of Peru
- Died: 6 November 1857 (aged 59); Paris, France
- Occupations: Scientist, geologist, mineralogist, chemist, archaeologist, politician, diplomat
- Known for: Discovery of Humboldtine; founding scientific institutions in Peru
- Spouse: Agueda Escolástica Pacheco de Salas y Salazar (m. 1840)
- Children: 4
- Awards: Order of Leopold (Belgium), Order of the Dannebrog (Denmark)

Mariano Eduardo de Rivero y Ustáriz (22 October 1798 – 6 November 1857) was a Peruvian scientist, geologist, mineralogist, chemist, archaeologist, politician, and diplomat. He published on the discovery of Humboldtine (an iron oxalate), which demonstrated the existence of organic minerals; on deposits of copper and sodium nitrate (saltpeter) near Tarapacá in the Atacama Desert; and on the industrial potential of guano and coal in Peru. He is considered a pioneer of mining education in South America and one of the most notable Peruvian scientists of the 19th century.

== Early life and education ==
Rivero was born in Arequipa, Peru, to Antonio Salvador de Rivero y Araníbar, a captain in the Spanish Royal Army in the Viceroyalty of Peru, and María Brígida de Ustáriz y Zúñiga.

Rivero was raised in a liberal Creole family during the colonial period and received his early education at the Seminary of San Jerónimo in Arequipa. His family sent him to Europe, and at the age of twelve, in 1810, he began his schooling in England. He was enrolled at a Catholic college at Highgate, outside London, whose head, Dowling, was a mathematician. There he studied mathematics, physics, Latin, French, and German. He moved to Paris in 1817 and enrolled at the École Royale des Mines (now Mines ParisTech), where he studied mineralogy and chemistry. His teachers there included Alexandre Brongniart, Pierre Berthier, and Darcet. In Paris, he met Alexander von Humboldt, who gave him letters of recommendation that opened several European academic circles to him. Rivero completed his mineralogical training at the Freiberg School of Mines in Saxony, and visited the Harz and other mining districts. During his European travels, he visited mines in England, France, and Spain.

== Scientific career ==
=== Early discoveries ===
Rivero discovered a new mineral originating in Bohemia (now the Czech Republic), which he named Humboldtine (an iron oxalate) in honor of his mentor and friend, Alexander von Humboldt. He published his first scientific works on the subject, among others, in France in 1821. He also identified a meerschaum (sepiolite) at Vallecas, which Alexandre Brongniart took up in a memoir of his own. A paper on amalgamation practice in the Americas, which he had read before the Société Philomathique, appeared in print in 1822.

=== Gran Colombia scientific mission ===
Rivero returned to the Americas at Humboldt's urging. Bolívar had given Francisco Antonio Zea, Gran Colombia's minister in Paris, the task of hiring scientists who could survey the young republic's natural resources and set up a museum of natural history and a mining school. Zea approached Alexander von Humboldt, who put him in contact with Rivero.

On Humboldt's recommendation, Zea hired Rivero in May 1822 to establish and direct a mining school in Bogotá, alongside a group of young European scientists. Bolívar promoted the project to strengthen the new nation's economy through natural science and mining technology. To prepare for the mission, Rivero acquired laboratory equipment and commissioned the construction of precision instruments.

Rivero returned to South America in November 1822, arriving at La Guaira, Venezuela, with the French chemist Jean Baptiste Boussingault. In Venezuela, they studied the thermal springs of Mariara and Onoto, the exploitation of mineral salts at Urao Lake, and the secretion of the cow tree, which is drinkable and milk-like. Rivero also made barometric observations during this period.

Rivero and Boussingault arrived in Bogotá in 1823 to find Bolívar away on campaign; Vice President Francisco de Paula Santander, then heading the government, put into force the law of 29 July 1823, which confirmed the mission's contracts and ordered the creation of a mining school and a natural history museum for the capital. In November 1823, Rivero inaugurated a museum of natural history and a mining school in Bogotá, serving as its first director. He and his team made expeditions into the eastern plains of Colombia. His report on these expeditions, Itinerario de los Llanos de San Martín y del río Meta, was later published in his Colección de memorias científicas... in 1857.

After three years in Colombia, during which he maintained constant correspondence with his European colleagues, Rivero left the country for lack of economic and political support. Bolívar then recommended him to the Peruvian government for similar projects.

=== Return to Peru ===
Simón Bolívar, who served as president of Gran Colombia (1819–1830) and president of Peru (1824–1827), arranged Rivero's return to his home country. Rivero left Bogotá and arrived in Lima at the end of 1825. In March 1826, the Peruvian government appointed him general director of mining, agriculture, public instruction, and museums.

In 1827–1828, as director of mining, he drew up a full plan and internal by-laws for a school of mines in Lima, secured the former Casa de la Inquisición as its seat, and assembled its laboratory and teaching collection, but the government, strained by economic and political crises, never issued the founding decree. He did found the first National Museum of Natural History, Antiquities and History of Peru (today the Museo Nacional de Arqueología, Antropología e Historia del Perú).

Rivero continued his scientific studies, traveled throughout Peru, and, with Nicolás Fernández de Piérola, founded a journal of the natural sciences, Memorial de Ciencias Naturales y de Industria Nacional y Extranjera, which was published between 1827 and 1829. In it, he wrote numerous articles and papers on topics such as the amalgamation of silver, the exploitation of guano, the analysis of mineral water from the thermal springs of Yura and other locations in Arequipa, reports on mining regions, and descriptions of gold, silver, and ceramic idols.

In 1829, General Antonio Gutiérrez de la Fuente revolted against the government and became president of Peru. Amid an economic crisis, he eliminated the position of director of mining. These circumstances and the political instability led Rivero to leave Peru and emigrate to Chile, where he continued his studies in meteorology, mineralogy, and geology.

== Political career ==
Rivero returned to Peru in 1832, resumed his previous position, continued his scientific work, and began a political career. In 1832, he was elected as a deputy to the congress for the province of Caylloma (department of Arequipa). General Felipe Santiago Salaverry, president of Peru (1835–1836), appointed him as his counselor in 1835.

Under the presidency of General Agustín Gamarra (1838–1841), Rivero was appointed inspector of public works. In 1839, he served as chief customs officer of Arica (then part of Peru; now in Chile). During the presidency of Marshal Ramón Castilla (1844–1851 and 1855–1862), Rivero was prefect of the department of Junín from 1845 to 1848. There, he founded the city of San Ramón and organized the first Peruvian school of mines, which opened in Huánuco on 28 July 1848. He was later prefect of the department of Moquegua.

== Diplomatic and later career ==
The president of Peru, Marshal Ramón Castilla, appointed Rivero as General Consul in Belgium in 1851. He received the Order of Leopold from the king of Belgium and the Order of the Dannebrog from the king of Denmark for his diplomatic service.

In 1851, Rivero co-published Antigüedades peruanas with Johann Jakob von Tschudi in Vienna, a study of the Inca Empire: its history, origins, government, scientific knowledge, language, religion, customs, and monuments.

In 1857, he published Colección de memorias científicas, agrícolas e industriales publicadas en distintas épocas, etc. in Brussels. This two-volume work collected many of his previously published articles on natural science, geology, mineralogy, mining, and agriculture.

== Personal life and death ==
Rivero married Agueda Escolástica Pacheco de Salas y Salazar on 18 February 1840. They had four children, whose education occupied him during his final years in Belgium.

Rivero died in Paris on 6 November 1857.

== Published works ==
- Rivero y Ustáriz, Mariano Eduardo (1821). "Note sur une combinaison de l'acide oxalique avec le fer trouvé à Kolowsereux, près Belin, en Bohême". Annales de chimie et de physique (in French). 18. Paris: 207–210.
- Rivero y Ustáriz, Mariano Eduardo (1821). "Note sur le cuivre muriate du Pérou, et sur le nitrate de soude trouvé dans le district d'Atacama, près du port de Iquique". Annales de chimie et de physique (in French). 18. Paris: 442–443.
- Rivero y Ustáriz, Mariano Eduardo (1821). "Note sur le nitrate de soude découvert dans le district de Tarapacá au Pérou". Annales des Mines (in French). 6. Paris: 596.
- Rivero y Ustáriz, Mariano Eduardo; Boussingault, J. B. (1824). "Mémoire sur différentes masses de fer qui ont été trouvées sur la Cordillère orientale des Andes". Annales de chimie et de physique (in French). 25: 438–443.
- Rivero y Ustáriz, Mariano Eduardo; Boussingault, J. B. (1825). "Mémoire sur le fait vénéneux de l'hura crépitant". Annales de chimie et de physique (in French). 28: 430–435.
- Rivero y Ustáriz, Mariano Eduardo (1825). "Mémoire sur l'urao (carbonate de soude)". Annales de chimie et de physique (in French). 29. Paris: 110–111.
- Rivero y Ustáriz, Mariano Eduardo (1827). Memoria sobre las aguas minerales de Yura y de otras partes cercanas a Arequipa, con aplicaciones médicas por los ss Vargas, J. M. y Adriazola Arve, J. M. (in Spanish). Lima.
- Rivero y Ustáriz, Mariano Eduardo; Fernández de Piérola, Nicolás (1827–1829). Memorial de Ciencias Naturales y de Industria Nacional y Extranjera (in Spanish). Lima: Imprenta de Instrucción Primaria.
- Rivero y Ustáriz, Mariano Eduardo (1836). "Notice géologique sur Santiago de Chile". Annales des Mines (in French). 10. Paris: 279–288.
- Rivero y Ustáriz, Mariano Eduardo (1841). Antigüedades Peruanas (in Spanish). Lima: Imprenta de José Masías.
- Rivero y Ustáriz, Mariano Eduardo (1848). Memoria sobre el rico mineral de azogue de Huancavelica (in Spanish). Lima: Imprenta de José Masías.
- Rivero y Ustáriz, Mariano Eduardo; Tschudi, Johann Jakob von (1851). Antigüedades Peruanas (in Spanish). Vienna: Imprenta Imperial de la Corte y Estado.
- Rivero y Ustáriz, Mariano Eduardo (1853). Peruvian Antiquities. Translated by F. L. Hawks. New York: Geo. P. Putnam and Co.
- Rivero y Ustáriz, Mariano Eduardo (1857). Colección de memorias científicas, agrícolas e industriales publicadas en distintas épocas, etc (in Spanish). Vol. 2. Brussels: H. Goemaere.
