= Johann Jakob von Tschudi =

Swiss naturalist, explorer, and diplomat (1818–1889)

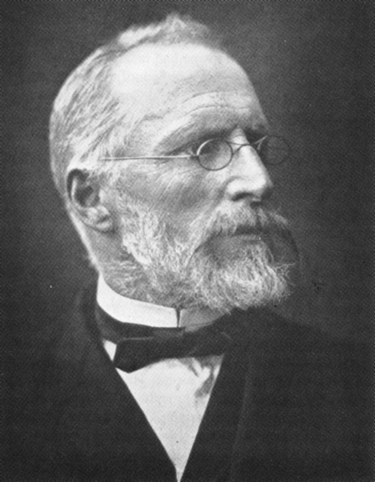
- Johann Jakob von Tschudi
- Born: Johann Jakob von Tschudi; 25 July 1818; Glarus, Switzerland
- Died: 8 October 1889 (aged 71); Lichtenegg, Austria
- Occupations: Naturalist, explorer, diplomat

Johann Jakob von Tschudi (25 July 1818 – 8 October 1889) was a Swiss naturalist, explorer, and diplomat. He is known for his travels in South America, his scientific contributions to zoology and anthropology, and his diplomatic service for Switzerland.

== Early life and education ==
Tschudi was born in Glarus to Johann Jakob Tschudi, a merchant, and Anna Maria Zwicky. He studied natural sciences and medicine at the universities of Neuchâtel, Leiden, and Paris.

== Exploration and scientific work ==
Tschudi reached Peru in 1838 and remained about five years, working from Lima and making journeys along the coast, the Andes, and the eastern forests. He collected zoological material, which he used in his later publications on Peruvian fauna. He returned to Europe early in 1843 and settled in Vienna. In 1845, he described 18 new species of South American reptiles. Between 1857 and 1859, he visited Brazil and other countries in South America.

Antigüedades peruanas, published in Vienna in 1851, appeared under the names of Tschudi and the Peruvian scientist Mariano Eduardo de Rivero y Ustáriz. (Note: By Tschudi's own account, nearly all of the book was Rivero's work: Tschudi wrote chapters II and V, edited the volume as a whole, and supplied its material on ancient skulls, language, and religion.) In the book, he explained the various skull angles of Peruvians in the context of the Angle of Camper. Tschudi claimed that Camper's facial angles were an "important angle in anthropology", whose "greater or less opening indicates the intellectual superiority of a race, and, up to a certain point, of individuals". He included engravings of a mummified foetus found near Tarma to argue that the cranial shape of the Huancas was not the result of cultural practices after birth.

== Quechua studies ==
Tschudi was one of the most prolific authors to document and record the Quechua language in the 19th century. His monumental Die Kechua-Sprache, written in German, included a grammar, corpus, and dictionary of Cusco Quechua. His later Organismus der Khetšua-Sprache is a more theoretical and comparative take on Quechua grammar which, unlike his longer work, considers multiple Quechua variants.

=== Ollanta ===
In 1875 Tschudi published his Quechua/German edition of the drama Ollantay. The work engendered a discussion of the origins of the play, with some ascribing it to ancient Incan cultures and others to having been an indigenous reworking of a Hispanic tale.

== Diplomatic career ==
In 1860, Tschudi was appointed Swiss ambassador to Brazil, a position he held until 1868. During this period, he continued to explore the country and collected plants for the museums of Neuchâtel, Glarus, and Freiburg. In 1868, he was appointed Swiss minister to Vienna.

== Legacy ==
Tschudi is commemorated in the scientific names of several animals, including a species of venomous South American coral snake, Micrurus tschudii, the montane guinea pig (Cavia tschudii), and the Tschudi's yellow-shouldered bat. Birds named after him include the Tschudi's tapaculo, Tschudi's nightjar, and the Tschudi's woodcreeper. Many of the specimen that Tschudi collected in Peru are kept today in the Natural History Museum of Neuchâtel in Switzerland.

== Works ==
- von Tschudi, Johann Jakob (1838). Classification der Batrachier, mit Berücksichtigung der fossilen Thiere dieser Abtheilung der Reptilien (in German). Neuchâtel: Petitpierre. OCLC 64755212.
- von Tschudi, Johann Jakob (1844–1847). Untersuchungen über die Fauna Peruana (in German). St. Gallen: Scheitlin und Zollikofer.
- von Tschudi, Johann Jakob (1845). "Reptilium conspectus quae in Republica Peruana reperiuntur et pleraque observata vel collecta sunt in itinere". Archiv für Naturgeschichte (in Latin). 11 (1). Berlin: 150–170.
- von Tschudi, Johann Jakob (1846). Peruanische Reiseskizzen während der Jahre 1838–42 (2 volumes) (in German).
- von Tschudi, Johann Jakob (1853). Die Ketchua-Sprache (3 volumes) (in German). Vienna: Kaiserl.-Königl. Hof- und Staatsdruckerei.
- von Tschudi, Johann Jakob (1860). Reise durch die Andes von Süd-Amerika (in German). Gotha: J. Perthes.
- von Tschudi, Johann Jakob (1863). Die brasilianische Provinz Minas Geraes (in German). Gotha: Justus Perthes.
- von Tschudi, Johann Jakob (1866–1869). Reisen durch Südamerika (5 volumes) (in German). Stuttgart: F.A. Brockhaus. OCLC 273091.
- von Tschudi, Johann Jakob (1884). Organismus der Khets̆ua-Sprache (in German). Leipzig: F.A. Brockhaus. OCLC 12964271.

He also co-edited, with Mariano Eduardo de Rivero y Ustáriz:

- de Rivero y Ustáriz, Mariano Eduardo; von Tschudi, Johann Jakob (1851). Antigüedades peruanas [Peruvian Antiquities] (in Spanish). Translated by F. L. Hawks. Vienna: Imprenta Imperial de la Corte y del Estado. OCLC 3027283.
