= Swedish Dialect Alphabet =

Phonetic alphabet for Swedish diaphonemes

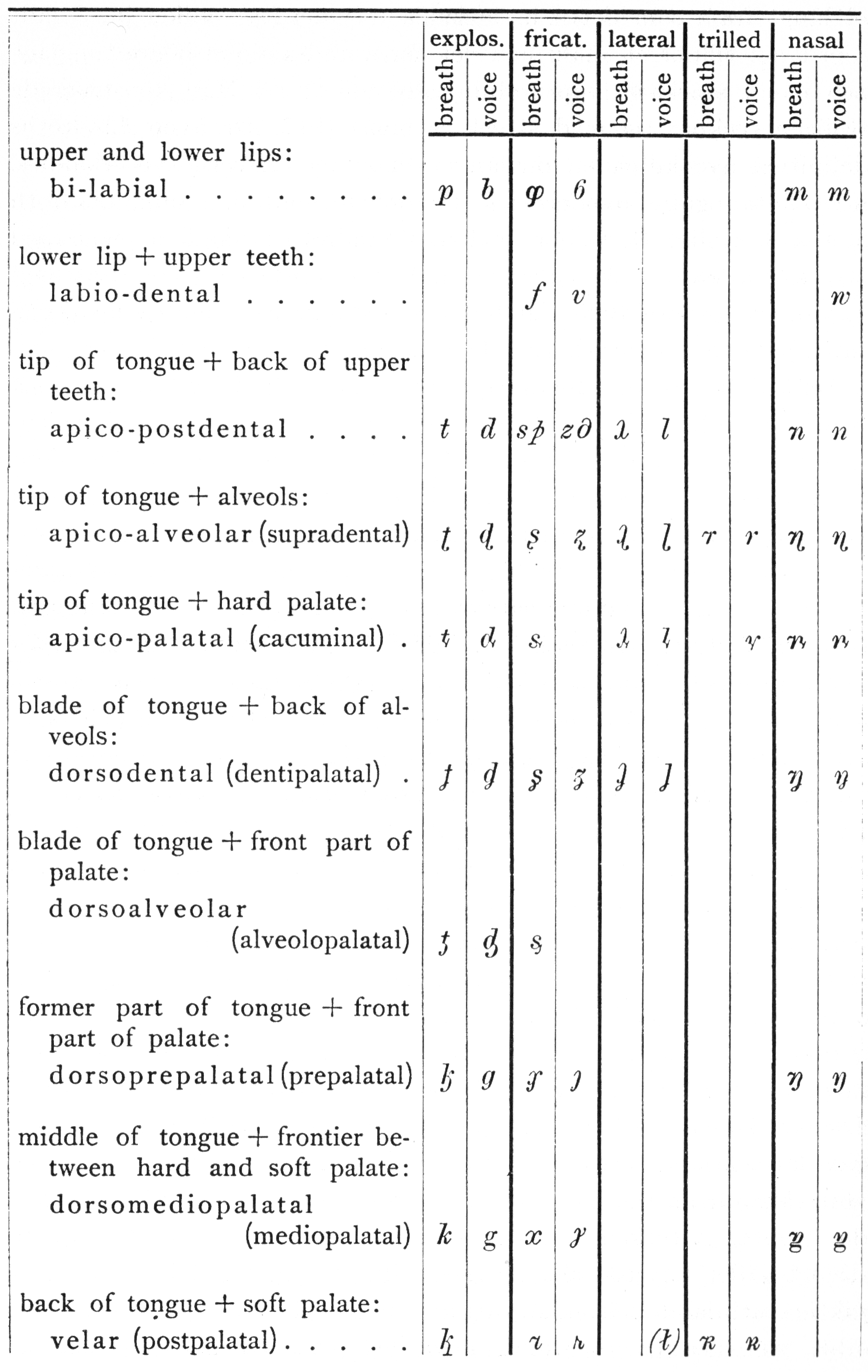
Table of consonants (1928)

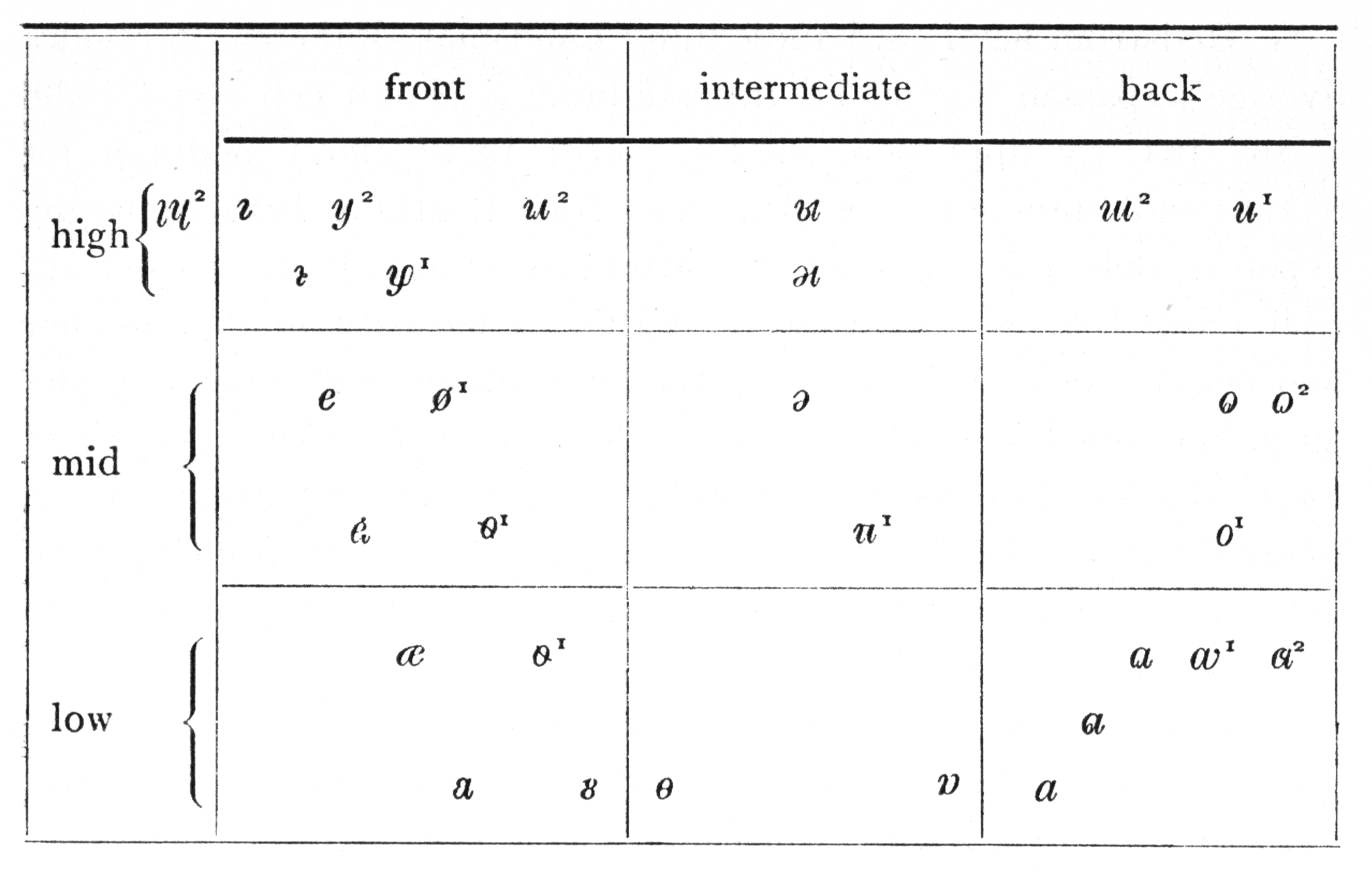
Table of vowels (1928)

The Swedish Dialect Alphabet (Swedish: Landsmålsalfabetet) is a phonetic alphabet created in 1878 by Johan August Lundell and used for the narrow transcription of Swedish dialects. The initial version of the alphabet consisted of 89 letters, 42 of which came from the phonetic alphabet proposed by Carl Jakob Sundevall. It has since grown to over 200 letters. The alphabet supplemented Latin letters with symbols adapted from a range of alphabets, including modified forms of þ and ð from Germanic alphabets, γ and φ from the Greek alphabet and ы from the Cyrillic alphabet, and extended with systematic decorations. There are also a number of diacritics representing prosodic features.

The alphabet has been used extensively for the description of Swedish dialects in both Sweden and Finland. It was also the source of many of the symbols used by the Swedish sinologist Bernhard Karlgren in his reconstruction of Middle Chinese.

Three of the additional letters—ⱸ, ⱹ and ⱺ—were included in version 5.1.0 of Unicode (U+2C78 to U+2C7A) for use in a dictionary of Swedish dialects spoken in Finland. A proposal to encode a further 106 characters was made in 2008. As of 2019, this proposal is partially implemented, with some proposed allocations already in use by other characters.

== See also ==
- International Phonetic Alphabet
- Dania transcription
