= Raúl Porras Barrenechea =

Peruvian politician (1897–1960)

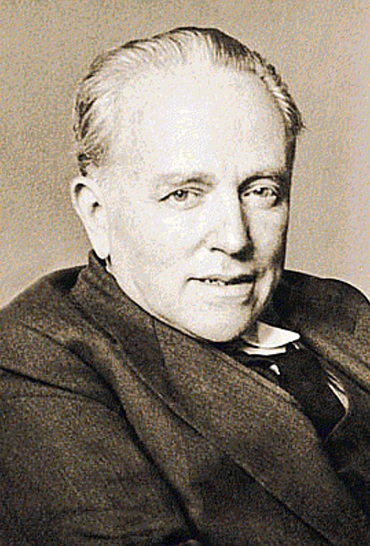

Minister of Foreign Affairs
- In office April 4, 1958 – September 12, 1960
- President: Manuel Prado Ugarteche
- Preceded by: Victor Andres Belaunde
- Succeeded by: Luis Alvarado Garrido

Representative to the League of Nations
- In office 1936–1938

Personal details
- Born: March 23, 1897 Pisco, Peru
- Died: September 27, 1960 (aged 63) Lima, Peru
- Education: National University of San Marcos
- Occupation: Diplomat, historian and politician

Juan Raúl José Porras Barrenechea (23 March 1897 – 27 September 1960) was a Peruvian diplomat, historian and politician. He served as president of the Senate in 1957, and as Minister of Foreign Affairs between 1958 and 1960. A well-known figure of the student movement in San Marcos in the early 20th century, Porras became one of the most prominent Hispanist historians of his generation and a leading figure of Peruvian diplomacy.

== Biography ==
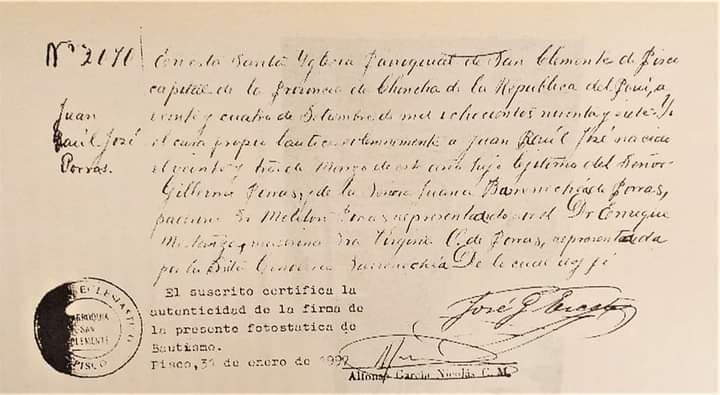
Reprint of Porras' baptismal certificate.

Porras was born on March 23, 1897, the son of Guillermo Porras Osores and Juana Barrenechea Raygada. The prominent family resided in a manor located at number 205 of Grau Avenue, near Barranco's central park, but spent most of their time in Pisco due to Guillermo's work running a cotton gin. Porras was a grandson of Melitón Porras Díaz, a distinguished diplomat and a former Prime Minister and Foreign Minister, and of José Antonio Barrenechea y Morales, who served as Foreign Minister several times.

Porras and his three other siblings lost their father in a duel against Arturo del Campo y Plata. The feud had its origin in a heated exchange that ensued after Del Campo and his wife sat at a bench at Barranco's central park, partially occupied by Porras and his wife, who had allegedly reserved the remaining space for friends. Del Campo's wife, speaking in French, suggested they leave as she believed Porras to be rude. Porras then replied that he understood and took offence to the comment, with Del Campo telling him off, after which Porras slapped him and a fight ensued until broken up.

To settle the dispute, Porras named José J. Rospigliosi Vigil and Luis Astete Concha as his seconds, while Del Campo did the same with Leoncio Lanfranco and Alberto Panizo, with both parties reuniting at the Hotel Central (Chorrillos) and at the Club Nacional (Calle Núñez) to discuss the conflict. Following the unsuccessful talks, the event ultimately took place at Santa Beatriz, then an estate, on March 22, 1899. Both duelists, their seconds, and two physicians (Daniel Espejo and Augusto Pérez Araníbar) arrived at 5 p.m., the agreed time. Porras was fatally shot once through the right parietal, after which his body was first taken to the estate's house, then to the police's intendancy for identification, and ultimately to his father's home in Mogollón Street.

Porras was educated at the Colegio Sagrados Corazones Recoleta, then located at France Square, and the University of San Marcos, where he obtained a degree in law in 1922 and a doctoral degree in philosophy, history and letters in 1928. While in San Marcos, Porras became a prominent figure in academic circles and a well-known leader of the so-called Centenary Generation. He was a student delegate to international conferences in La Paz, Buenos Aires and Mexico City, and was an active member of the University Reform movement.

In 1919, he was named personal secretary to the Minister of Foreign Affairs. Then, he was appointed librarian of the Ministry in 1922 and Adviser to the Peruvian Delegation in the Plebiscitary Commission for the Tacna-Arica Affair in 1924. In 1926, he was appointed Chief of the Archive of Limits, the cartographic department of the Ministry, and Representative to the Centenary of the Panama Congress.

In 1928, Porras, already a respected academic and published author, entered San Marcos obtaining a tenure position. He subsequently taught Spanish literature, history of Peru and diplomatic history. In 1933, he also started to teach at the Catholic University of Lima. During these years, he published several historical biographies and researches on the colonial period.

In 1934, he moved to Europe. In Spain, he conducted research at the General Archive of the Indies, the National Historical Archive and the Library of the Royal Palace of Madrid. Next year, Porras was appointed Counsellor of the Peruvian legation in Madrid and, in 1936, he was appointed Representative to the League of Nations in Geneva, a post he occupied until 1938. Before returning to his country in 1940, he edited some of the works of César Vallejo in Paris and continued his research at the Spanish archives.

In 1941, Porras was appointed Adviser to the Ministry and Chief of the Press Office. He was subsequently promoted to the ranks of Minister Plenipotentiary and Ambassador in 1942 and 1944, respectively. He entered the Hispanic Society of America in 1944 and obtained the National Prize of History in 1945. In 1948, he was appointed Ambassador to Spain. Upon his return in 1950, he was named Director of the Institute of History of San Marcos and was elected President of the Peruvian Institute of Hispanic Culture.

In 1956, he was elected Senator and that same year Vice President of his chamber. In 1957, he became President of the Senate for six months due to the sudden death of José Gálvez. Next year, President Manuel Prado appointed him Minister of Foreign Affairs. He performed his duties as Minister with some interruptions due to his ill health. However, Porras attended the 13th General Assembly of the United Nations in 1958, the 14th General Assembly in 1959 and accompanied President Prado in his state visits to France, Italy and Germany in 1960. In August of this year, he attended the 8th Conference of American Ministers of Foreign Relations in Costa Rica and gave his historic speech against the new U.S. intervention in Cuba.

Seriously ill, Porras resigned on 12 September 1960, and died fifteen days later on 27 September.

== Works ==
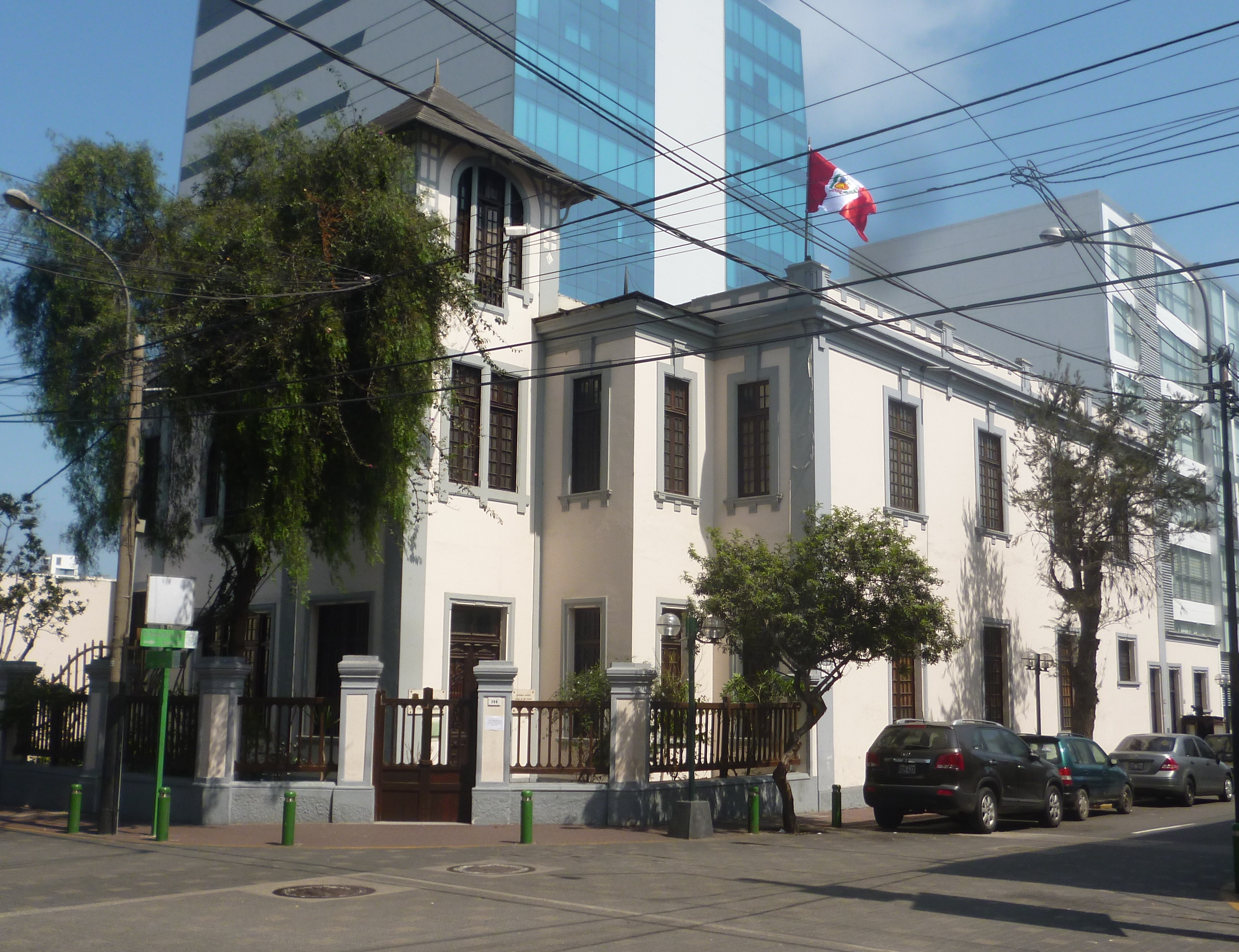
View of Porras' house in Miraflores, today the headquarters of the institute named after him.

He is the author of, among others, the following works:

- El periodismo en el Perú. 1921
- Lima. 1924
- Alegato del Perú en la cuestión de límites de Tacna y Arica. 1925
- Historia de los límites del Perú. 1926
- Mariano José de Arce. 1926
- Réplica a la exposición chilena. 2 vols. 1927
- José Antonio Barrenechea. 1928
- Toribio Pacheco. 1928
- El congreso de Panamá. 1930
- Historia de los Límites del Perú: Texto dictado a los alumnos del Colegio Anglo-Peruano de Lima. (Lima: F. y E. Rosay. 1930)
- Pequeña antología de Lima. Madrid. 1935
- El testamento de Pizarro. París. 1936
- Las relaciones primitivas y la indisciplina republicana. (París: Impr. Les Presses modernes. 1937)
- El inca Garcilaso de la Vega (1539-1616) (Lima: Lumen. 1946)
- Relación de la descendencia de Garci Pérez de Vargas (1596). Inca Garcilaso de la Vega. Facsimile reproduction of the original manuscript with a foreword by Raúl Porras Barrenechea. (Lima: Instituto de Historia. 1951)
- El inca Garcilaso, en Montilla, 1561-1614: nuevos documentos hallados y publicados. (Lima: Instituto de Historia-Editorial San Marcos. 1955)
- El paisaje peruano de Garcilaso a Riva Agüero. (Lima: Imprenta Santa María. 1955)
- Cartas del Perú, 1524-1543. (Lima: Sociedad de Bibliófilos Peruanos. 1959)
- Antología del Cuzco. (Lima: Librería Internacional del Perú. 1961)
- Fuentes históricas peruanas: Apuntes de un curso universitario. (Lima: Instituto Raúl Porras Barrenechea. 1963)
- Los cronistas del Perú. (Lima: Sanmartí Impresores. 1962)
- Pizarro (Lima: Editorial Pizarro. 1978)
- San Marcos, la cultura peruana (Lima: Fondo Editorial UNMSM, 2010)
- Pequeña antología de Lima/ El nombre del Perú (2005) Orbis Ventures S.A.C. Lima ISBN 9972-205-92-4

== See also ==
- Raúl Porras Barrenechea Institute

Diplomatic posts
Preceded by Víctor Andrés Belaúnde	Minister of Foreign Affairs; 1958–1960	Succeeded by Luis Alvarado Garrido
