= List of birds of Venezuela =

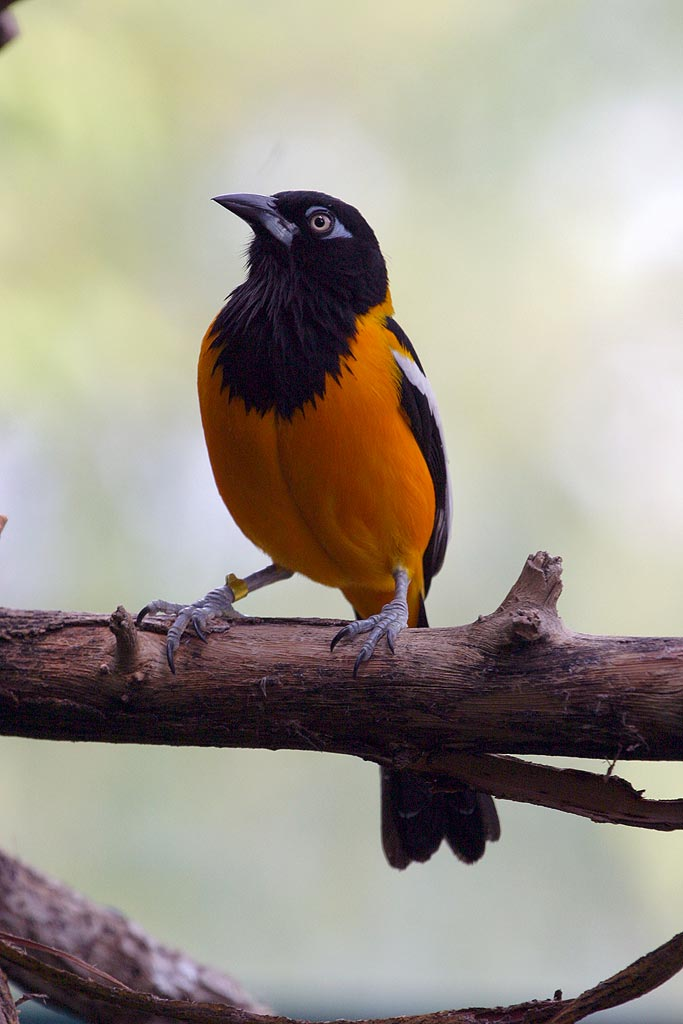
The Venezuelan troupial is the national bird of Venezuela.

This is a list of the bird species recorded in Venezuela. The avifauna of Venezuela has 1414 confirmed species, of which 44 are endemic, six have been introduced by humans, 48 are rare or vagrants, and one has been extirpated. An additional 20 species are unconfirmed (see below).

Except as an entry is cited otherwise, the list of species is that of the South American Classification Committee (SACC). The list's taxonomic treatment (designation and sequence of orders, families, and species) and nomenclature (common and scientific names) are also those of the SACC unless noted otherwise. Capitalization within English names follows Wikipedia practice, i.e. only the first word of a name is capitalized unless a place name such as São Paulo is used.

The following tags have been used to highlight certain categories of occurrence.

- (V) Vagrant - a species that rarely or accidentally occurs in Venezuela
- (E) Endemic - a species endemic to Venezuela
- (I) Introduced - a species introduced to Venezuela as a consequence, direct or indirect, of human actions
- (U) Unconfirmed - a species recorded but with "no tangible evidence" according to the SACC

== Tinamous ==
Order: Tinamiformes Family: Tinamidae

The tinamous are one of the most ancient groups of bird. Although they look similar to other ground-dwelling birds like quail and grouse, they have no close relatives and are classified as a single family, Tinamidae, within their own order, the Tinamiformes. Fourteen species have been recorded in Venezuela.

- Tawny-breasted tinamou, Nothocercus julius
- Highland tinamou, Nothocercus bonapartei
- Gray tinamou, Tinamus tao
- Great tinamou, Tinamus major
- White-throated tinamou, Tinamus guttatus
- Cinereous tinamou, Crypturellus cinereus
- Little tinamou, Crypturellus soui
- Tepui tinamou, Crypturellus ptaritepui
- Brown tinamou, Crypturellus obsoletus
- Undulated tinamou, Crypturellus undulatus
- Gray-legged tinamou, Crypturellus duidae
- Red-legged tinamou, Crypturellus erythropus
- Variegated tinamou, Crypturellus variegatus
- Barred tinamou, Crypturellus casiquiare

== Screamers ==
Order: Anseriformes Family: Anhimidae

The screamers are a small family of birds related to the ducks. They are large bulky birds, with a small downy head, long legs and large feet which are only partially webbed. They have large spurs on their wings which are used in fights over mates and in territorial disputes. Two species have been recorded in Venezuela.

- Horned screamer, Anhima cornuta
- Northern screamer, Chauna chavaria

== Ducks ==
Order: Anseriformes Family: Anatidae

Anatidae includes the ducks and most duck-like waterfowl, such as geese and swans. These birds are adapted to an aquatic existence with webbed feet, flattened bills, and feathers that are excellent at shedding water due to an oily coating. Twenty-one species have been recorded in Venezuela.

- Fulvous whistling-duck, Dendrocygna bicolor
- White-faced whistling-duck, Dendrocygna viduata
- Black-bellied whistling-duck, Dendrocygna autumnalis
- Orinoco goose, Oressochen jubata
- Muscovy duck, Cairina moschata
- Comb duck, Sarkidiornis sylvicola
- Brazilian teal, Amazonetta brasiliensis
- Torrent duck, Merganetta armata
- Northern shoveler, Spatula clypeata
- Blue-winged teal, Spatula discors
- Cinnamon teal, Spatula cyanoptera
- Eurasian wigeon, Mareca penelope (U)
- American wigeon, Mareca americana
- White-cheeked pintail, Anas bahamensis
- Northern pintail, Anas acuta
- Green-winged teal, Anas crecca (V)
- Andean teal, Anas andium
- Southern pochard, Netta erythrophthalma
- Ring-necked duck, Aythya collaris
- Lesser scaup, Aythya affinis
- Masked duck, Nomonyx dominicus

== Guans ==
Order: Galliformes Family: Cracidae

The Cracidae are large birds, similar in general appearance to turkeys. The guans and curassows live in trees, but the smaller chachalacas are found in more open scrubby habitats. They are generally dull-plumaged, but the curassows and some guans have colorful facial ornaments. Fifteen species have been recorded in Venezuela.

- Band-tailed guan, Penelope argyrotis
- Andean guan, Penelope montagnii
- Marail guan, Penelope marail
- Spix's guan, Penelope jacquacu
- Crested guan, Penelope purpurascens
- Blue-throated piping-guan, Pipile cumanensis
- Wattled guan, Aburria aburri
- Rufous-vented chachalaca, Ortalis ruficauda
- Speckled chachalaca, Ortalis guttata (U)
- Variable chachalaca, Ortalis motmot
- Nocturnal curassow, Nothocrax urumutum
- Yellow-knobbed curassow, Crax daubentoni
- Black curassow, Crax alector
- Crestless curassow, Mitu tomentosum
- Helmeted curassow, Pauxi pauxi

== New World quails ==
Order: Galliformes Family: Odontophoridae

The New World quails are small, plump terrestrial birds only distantly related to the quails of the Old World, but named for their similar appearance and habits. Four species have been recorded in Venezuela.

- Crested bobwhite, Colinus cristatus
- Marbled wood-quail, Odontophorus gujanensis
- Black-fronted wood-quail, Odontophorus atrifrons
- Venezuelan wood-quail, Odontophorus columbianus (E)

== Flamingos ==
Order: Phoenicopteriformes Family: Phoenicopteridae

Flamingos are gregarious wading birds, usually 3 to 5 feet (0.9 to 1.5 m) tall, found in both the Western and Eastern Hemispheres. Flamingos filter-feed on shellfish and algae. Their oddly shaped beaks are specially adapted to separate mud and silt from the food they consume and, uniquely, are used upside-down. One species has been recorded in Venezuela.

- American flamingo, Phoenicopterus ruber

== Grebes ==
Order: Podicipediformes Family: Podicipedidae

Grebes are small to medium-large freshwater diving birds. They have lobed toes and are excellent swimmers and divers. However, they have their feet placed far back on the body, making them quite ungainly on land. Two species have been recorded in Venezuela.

- Least grebe, Tachybaptus dominicus
- Pied-billed grebe, Podilymbus podiceps

== Pigeons ==
Order: Columbiformes Family: Columbidae

Pigeons and doves are stout-bodied birds with short necks and short slender bills with a fleshy cere. Twenty-two species have been recorded in Venezuela.

- Rock pigeon, Columba livia (I)
- White-crowned pigeon, Patagioenas leucocephala (V)
- Scaled pigeon, Patagioenas speciosa
- Scaly-naped pigeon, Patagioenas squamosa
- Bare-eyed pigeon, Patagioenas corensis
- Band-tailed pigeon, Patagioenas fasciata
- Pale-vented pigeon, Patagioenas cayennensis
- Plumbeous pigeon, Patagioenas plumbea
- Ruddy pigeon, Patagioenas subvinacea
- Ruddy quail-dove, Geotrygon montana
- Violaceous quail-dove, Geotrygon violacea
- White-tipped dove, Leptotila verreauxi
- Gray-fronted dove, Leptotila rufaxilla
- Lined quail-dove, Zentrygon linearis
- White-winged dove, Zenaida asiatica (V)
- Eared dove, Zenaida auriculata
- Blue ground dove, Claravis pretiosa
- Maroon-chested ground dove, Paraclaravis mondetoura
- Common ground dove, Columbina passerina
- Plain-breasted ground dove, Columbina minuta
- Ruddy ground dove, Columbina talpacoti
- Scaled dove, Columbina squammata

== Cuckoos ==
Order: Cuculiformes Family: Cuculidae

The family Cuculidae includes cuckoos, roadrunners, and anis. These birds are of variable size with slender bodies, long tails, and strong legs. Seventeen species have been recorded in Venezuela.

- Greater ani, Crotophaga major
- Smooth-billed ani, Crotophaga ani
- Groove-billed ani, Crotophaga sulcirostris
- Striped cuckoo, Tapera naevia
- Pheasant cuckoo, Dromococcyx phasianellus
- Pavonine cuckoo, Dromococcyx pavoninus
- Rufous-winged ground-cuckoo, Neomorphus rufipennis
- Little cuckoo, Coccycua minuta
- Dwarf cuckoo, Coccycua pumila
- Squirrel cuckoo, Piaya cayana
- Black-bellied cuckoo, Piaya melanogaster
- Dark-billed cuckoo, Coccyzus melacoryphus
- Yellow-billed cuckoo, Coccyzus americanus
- Pearly-breasted cuckoo, Coccyzus euleri
- Mangrove cuckoo, Coccyzus minor
- Black-billed cuckoo, Coccyzus erythropthalmus
- Gray-capped cuckoo, Coccyzus lansbergi

== Oilbird ==
Order: Steatornithiformes Family: Steatornithidae

The oilbird is a slim, long-winged bird related to the nightjars. It is nocturnal and a specialist feeder on the fruit of the oil palm.

- Oilbird, Steatornis caripensis

== Potoos ==
Order: Nyctibiiformes Family: Nyctibiidae

The potoos (sometimes called poor-me-ones) are large near passerine birds related to the nightjars and frogmouths. They are nocturnal insectivores which lack the bristles around the mouth found in the true nightjars. Six species have been recorded in Venezuela.

- Rufous potoo, Phyllaemulor bracteatus
- Great potoo, Nyctibius grandis
- Long-tailed potoo, Nyctibius aethereus
- Common potoo, Nyctibius griseus
- Andean potoo, Nyctibius maculosus
- White-winged potoo, Nyctibius leucopterus

== Nightjars ==
Order: Caprimulgiformes Family: Caprimulgidae

Nightjars are medium-sized nocturnal birds that usually nest on the ground. They have long wings, short legs, and very short bills. Most have small feet, of little use for walking, and long pointed wings. Their soft plumage is camouflaged to resemble bark or leaves. Twenty species have been recorded in Venezuela.

- Nacunda nighthawk, Chordeiles nacunda
- Least nighthawk, Chordeiles pusillus
- Sand-colored nighthawk, Chordeiles rupestris
- Lesser nighthawk, Chordeiles acutipennis
- Common nighthawk, Chordeiles minor
- Antillean nighthawk, Chordeiles gundlachii (V)
- Band-tailed nighthawk, Nyctiprogne leucopyga (see note) (Note: The SACC has split Nyctiprogne atifascia from Nyctiprogne leucopyga (Proposal 673) but has not assigned English names, so the proposal has not been implemented and the counts do not reflect the change.)
- Short-tailed nighthawk, Lurocalis semitorquatus
- Rufous-bellied nighthawk, Lurocalis rufiventris
- Blackish nightjar, Nyctipolus nigrescens
- Common pauraque, Nyctidromus albicollis
- Roraiman nightjar, Tepuiornis whitelyi
- Lyre-tailed nightjar, Uropsalis lyra
- Todd's nightjar, Setopagis heterura
- Spot-tailed nightjar, Hydropsalis maculicaudus
- White-tailed nightjar, Hydropsalis cayennensis
- Ladder-tailed nightjar, Hydropsalis climacocerca
- Band-winged nightjar, Systellura longirostris
- Chuck-will's-widow, Antrostomus carolinensis
- Rufous nightjar, Antrostomus rufus

== Swifts ==
Order: Apodiformes Family: Apodidae

Swifts are small birds which spend the majority of their lives flying. These birds have very short legs and never settle voluntarily on the ground, perching instead only on vertical surfaces. Many swifts have long swept-back wings which resemble a crescent or boomerang. Eighteen species have been recorded in Venezuela.

- Spot-fronted swift, Cypseloides cherriei
- White-chinned swift, Cypseloides cryptus
- Black swift, Cypseloides niger (V)
- Chestnut-collared swift, Streptoprocne rutila
- Tepui swift, Streptoprocne phelpsi
- White-collared swift, Streptoprocne zonaris
- Gray-rumped swift, Chaetura cinereiventris
- Band-rumped swift, Chaetura spinicaudus
- Chimney swift, Chaetura pelagica (V)
- Vaux's swift, Chaetura vauxi
- Chapman's swift, Chaetura chapmani
- Ashy-tailed swift, Chaetura andrei (E)
- Sick's swift, Chaetura meridionalis (U)
- Short-tailed swift, Chaetura brachyura
- White-tipped swift, Aeronautes montivagus
- Pygmy palm swift, Tachornis furcata
- Fork-tailed palm swift, Tachornis squamata
- Lesser swallow-tailed swift, Panyptila cayennensis

== Hummingbirds ==
Order: Apodiformes Family: Trochilidae

Hummingbirds are small birds capable of hovering in mid-air due to the rapid flapping of their wings. They are the only birds that can fly backwards. One hundred-one species have been recorded in Venezuela.

- Crimson topaz, Topaza pella
- Fiery topaz, Topaza pyra
- White-necked jacobin, Florisuga mellivora
- White-tipped sicklebill, Eutoxeres aquila
- Rufous-breasted hermit, Glaucis hirsutus
- Band-tailed barbthroat, Threnetes ruckeri
- Pale-tailed barbthroat, Threnetes leucurus
- Streak-throated hermit, Phaethornis rupurumii
- Little hermit, Phaethornis longuemareus
- Stripe-throated hermit, Phaethornis striigularis
- Gray-chinned hermit, Phaethornis griseogularis
- Reddish hermit, Phaethornis ruber
- Sooty-capped hermit, Phaethornis augusti
- Pale-bellied hermit, Phaethornis anthophilus
- White-bearded hermit, Phaethornis hispidus
- Green hermit, Phaethornis guy
- Straight-billed hermit, Phaethornis bourcieri
- Long-billed hermit, Phaethornis longirostris
- Long-tailed hermit, Phaethornis superciliosus
- Great-billed hermit, Phaethornis malaris
- Green-fronted lancebill, Doryfera ludovicae
- Blue-fronted lancebill, Doryfera johannae
- Geoffroy's daggerbill, Schistes geoffroyi
- Brown violetear, Colibri delphinae
- Lesser violetear, Colibri cyanotus
- Sparkling violetear, Colibri coruscans
- Black-eared fairy, Heliothryx auritus
- White-tailed goldenthroat, Polytmus guainumbi
- Tepui goldenthroat, Polytmus milleri (E)
- Green-tailed goldenthroat, Polytmus theresiae
- Fiery-tailed awlbill, Avocettula recurvirostris
- Ruby-topaz hummingbird, Chrysolampis mosquitus
- Green-throated mango, Anthracothorax viridigula
- Green-breasted mango, Anthracothorax prevostii
- Black-throated mango, Anthracothorax nigricollis
- Orange-throated sunangel, Heliangelus mavors
- Amethyst-throated sunangel, Heliangelus amethysticollis
- Black-bellied thorntail, Discosura langsdorffi
- Racket-tipped thorntail, Discosura longicaudus
- Tufted coquette, Lophornis ornatus
- Spangled coquette, Lophornis stictolophus
- Butterfly coquette, Lophornis verreauxii
- Peacock coquette, Lophornis pavoninus
- Speckled hummingbird, Adelomyia melanogenys
- Long-tailed sylph, Aglaiocercus kingii
- Venezuelan sylph, Aglaiocercus berlepschi (E)
- Purple-backed thornbill, Ramphomicron microrhynchum
- White-bearded helmetcrest, Oxypogon lindenii (E)
- Bronze-tailed thornbill, Chalcostigma heteropogon
- Tyrian metaltail, Metallura tyrianthina
- Perija metaltail, Metallura iracunda
- Glowing puffleg, Eriocnemis vestita
- Coppery-bellied puffleg, Eriocnemis cupreoventris
- Sapphire-vented puffleg, Eriocnemis luciani (U)
- Bronzy inca, Coeligena coeligena
- Collared inca, Coeligena torquata
- Golden-bellied starfrontlet, Coeligena bonapartei
- Blue-throated starfrontlet, Coeligena helianthea
- Mountain velvetbreast, Lafresnaya lafresnayi
- Sword-billed hummingbird, Ensifera ensifera
- Great sapphirewing, Pterophanes cyanopterus (U)
- Buff-tailed coronet, Boissonneaua flavescens
- Booted racket-tail, Ocreatus underwoodii
- Velvet-browed brilliant, Heliodoxa xanthogonys
- Gould's jewelfront, Heliodoxa aurescens
- Violet-fronted brilliant, Heliodoxa leadbeateri
- Violet-chested hummingbird, Sternoclyta cyanopectus
- Scissor-tailed hummingbird, Hylonympha macrocerca (E)
- Long-billed starthroat, Heliomaster longirostris
- Gorgeted woodstar, Chaetocercus heliodor
- Rufous-shafted woodstar, Chaetocercus jourdanii
- Amethyst woodstar, Calliphlox amethystina
- Red-billed emerald, Chlorostilbon gibsoni
- Blue-tailed emerald, Chlorostilbon mellisugus
- Coppery emerald, Chlorostilbon russatus
- Narrow-tailed emerald, Chlorostilbon stenurus
- Green-tailed emerald, Chlorostilbon alice (E)
- Short-tailed emerald, Chlorostilbon poortmani
- Blue-chinned sapphire, Chlorestes notata
- Violet-headed hummingbird, Klais guimeti
- Gray-breasted sabrewing, Campylopterus largipennis
- Rufous-breasted sabrewing, Campylopterus hyperythrus
- White-tailed sabrewing, Campylopterus ensipennis
- Lazuline sabrewing, Campylopterus falcatus
- Buff-breasted sabrewing, Campylopterus duidae
- White-vented plumeleteer, Chalybura buffonii
- Crowned woodnymph, Thalurania colombica
- Fork-tailed woodnymph, Thalurania furcata
- Buffy hummingbird, Leucippus fallax
- Steely-vented hummingbird, Saucerottia saucerottei
- Green-bellied hummingbird, Saucerottia viridigaster
- Copper-rumped hummingbird, Saucerottia tobaci
- Rufous-tailed hummingbird, Amazilia tzacatl
- Versicolored emerald, Chrysuronia versicolor
- Golden-tailed sapphire, Chrysuronia oenone
- Shining-green hummingbird, Chrysuronia goudoti
- White-chested emerald, Chrysuronia brevirostris
- Plain-bellied emerald, Chrysuronia leucogaster
- Glittering-throated emerald, Chionomesa fimbriata
- Sapphire-spangled emerald, Chionomesa lactea
- Rufous-throated sapphire, Hylocharis sapphirina
- White-chinned sapphire, Chlorestes cyanus

== Hoatzin ==
Order: Opisthocomiformes Family: Opisthocomidae

The Hoatzin is pheasant-sized, but much slimmer. It has a long tail and neck, but a small head with an unfeathered blue face and red eyes which are topped by a spiky crest. It is a weak flier which is found in the swamps of the Amazon and Orinoco rivers.

- Hoatzin, Opisthocomus hoazin

== Limpkin ==
Order: Gruiformes Family: Aramidae

The limpkin resembles a large rail. It has drab-brown plumage and a grayer head and neck.

- Limpkin, Aramus guarauna

== Trumpeters ==
Order: Gruiformes Family: Psophiidae

The trumpeters are dumpy birds with long necks and legs and chicken-like bills. They are named for the trumpeting call of the males. One species has been recorded in Venezuela.

- Gray-winged trumpeter, Psophia crepitans

== Rails ==
Order: Gruiformes Family: Rallidae

Rallidae is a large family of small to medium-sized birds which includes the rails, crakes, coots, and gallinules. Typically they inhabit dense vegetation in damp environments near lakes, swamps, or rivers. In general they are shy and secretive birds, making them difficult to observe. Most species have strong legs and long toes which are well adapted to soft uneven surfaces. They tend to have short, rounded wings and to be weak fliers. Twenty-two species have been recorded in Venezuela.

- Mangrove rail, Rallus longirostris
- Plain-flanked rail, Rallus wetmorei (E)
- Purple gallinule, Porphyrio martinica
- Azure gallinule, Porphyrio flavirostris
- Russet-crowned crake, Anurolimnas viridis
- Rusty-flanked crake, Laterallus levraudi (E)
- Rufous-sided crake, Laterallus melanophaius
- White-throated crake, Laterallus albigularis
- Gray-breasted crake, Laterallus exilis
- Speckled rail, Coturnicops notatus
- Ocellated crake, Micropygia schomburgkii
- Ash-throated crake, Mustelirallus albicollis
- Paint-billed crake, Mustelirallus erythrops
- Spotted rail, Pardirallus maculatus
- Blackish rail, Pardirallus nigricans
- Gray-cowled wood-rail, Aramides cajaneus
- Rufous-necked wood-rail, Aramides axillaris
- Uniform crake, Amaurolimnas concolor
- Yellow-breasted crake, Hapalocrex flaviventer
- Sora, Porzana carolina
- Common gallinule, Gallinula galeata
- American coot, Fulica americana

== Finfoots ==
Order: Gruiformes Family: Heliornithidae

Heliornithidae is a small family of tropical birds with webbed lobes on their feet similar to those of grebes and coots. One species has been recorded in Venezuela.

- Sungrebe, Heliornis fulica

== Plovers ==
Order: Charadriiformes Family: Charadriidae

The family Charadriidae includes the plovers, dotterels, and lapwings. They are small to medium-sized birds with compact bodies, short, thick necks, and long, usually pointed, wings. They are found in open country worldwide, mostly in habitats near water. Ten species have been recorded in Venezuela.

- Black-bellied plover, Pluvialis squatarola
- American golden-plover, Pluvialis dominica
- Pied lapwing, Hoploxypterus cayanus
- Killdeer, Charadrius vociferus
- Semipalmated plover, Charadrius semipalmatus
- Piping plover, Charadrius melodus (V)
- Southern lapwing, Vanellus chilensis
- Wilson's plover, Anarynchus wilsonia
- Collared plover, Anarynchus collaris
- Snowy plover, Anarynchus nivosus

== Oystercatchers ==
Order: Charadriiformes Family: Haematopodidae

The oystercatchers are large and noisy plover-like birds, with strong bills used for smashing or prising open molluscs. One species has been recorded in Venezuela.

- American oystercatcher, Haematopus palliatus

== Avocets and stilts ==
Order: Charadriiformes Family: Recurvirostridae

Recurvirostridae is a family of large wading birds, which includes the avocets and stilts. The avocets have long legs and long up-curved bills. The stilts have extremely long legs and long, thin, straight bills. One species has been recorded in Venezuela.

- Black-necked stilt, Himantopus mexicanus

== Thick-knees ==
Order: Charadriiformes Family: Burhinidae

The thick-knees are a group of largely tropical waders in the family Burhinidae. They are found worldwide within the tropical zone, with some species also breeding in temperate Europe and Australia. They are medium to large waders with strong black or yellow-black bills, large yellow eyes, and cryptic plumage. Despite being classed as waders, most species have a preference for arid or semi-arid habitats. One species has been recorded in Venezuela.

- Double-striped thick-knee, Hesperoburhinus bistriatus

== Sandpipers ==
Order: Charadriiformes Family: Scolopacidae

Scolopacidae is a large diverse family of small to medium-sized shorebirds including the sandpipers, curlews, godwits, shanks, tattlers, woodcocks, snipes, dowitchers, and phalaropes. The majority of these species eat small invertebrates picked out of the mud or soil. Variation in length of legs and bills enables multiple species to feed in the same habitat, particularly on the coast, without direct competition for food. Thirty-three species have been recorded in Venezuela.

- Upland sandpiper, Bartramia longicauda
- Whimbrel, Numenius phaeopus
- Long-billed curlew, Numenius americanus (V)
- Bar-tailed godwit, Limosa lapponica (V)
- Hudsonian godwit, Limosa haemastica
- Marbled godwit, Limosa fedoa
- Ruddy turnstone, Arenaria interpres
- Red knot, Calidris canutus
- Ruff, Calidris pugnax (U)
- Stilt sandpiper, Calidris himantopus
- Sanderling, Calidris alba
- Dunlin, Calidris alpina (V)
- Baird's sandpiper, Calidris bairdii (V)
- Least sandpiper, Calidris minutilla
- White-rumped sandpiper, Calidris fuscicollis
- Buff-breasted sandpiper, Calidris subruficollis
- Pectoral sandpiper, Calidris melanotos
- Semipalmated sandpiper, Calidris pusilla
- Western sandpiper, Calidris mauri
- Short-billed dowitcher, Limnodromus griseus
- Long-billed dowitcher, Limnodromus scolopaceus (V)
- Jameson's snipe, Gallinago jamesoni
- Noble snipe, Gallinago nobilis
- Giant snipe, Gallinago undulata
- Wilson's snipe, Gallinago delicata
- Pantanal snipe, Gallinago paraguaiae
- Wilson's phalarope, Phalaropus tricolor
- Red-necked phalarope, Phalaropus lobatus (V)
- Spotted sandpiper, Actitis macularius
- Solitary sandpiper, Tringa solitaria
- Greater yellowlegs, Tringa melanoleuca
- Willet, Tringa semipalmata
- Lesser yellowlegs, Tringa flavipes

== Jacanas ==
Order: Charadriiformes Family: Jacanidae

The jacanas are a group of waders found throughout the tropics. They are identifiable by their huge feet and claws which enable them to walk on floating vegetation in the shallow lakes that are their preferred habitat. One species has been recorded in Venezuela.

- Wattled jacana, Jacana jacana

== Skuas ==
Order: Charadriiformes Family: Stercorariidae

The family Stercorariidae are, in general, medium to large birds, typically with gray or brown plumage, often with white markings on the wings. They nest on the ground in temperate and arctic regions and are long-distance migrants. Five species have been recorded in Venezuela.

- Great skua, Stercorarius skua (U)
- South polar skua, Stercorarius maccormicki (V)
- Pomarine jaeger, Stercorarius pomarinus
- Parasitic jaeger, Stercorarius parasiticus
- Long-tailed jaeger, Stercorarius longicaudus (U)

== Gulls ==
Order: Charadriiformes Family: Laridae

Laridae is a family of medium to large seabirds and includes gulls, kittiwakes, and terns. Gulls are typically gray or white, often with black markings on the head or wings. They have stout, longish bills and webbed feet. Terns are a group of generally medium to large seabirds typically with gray or white plumage, often with black markings on the head. Most terns hunt fish by diving but some pick insects off the surface of fresh water. Terns are generally long-lived birds, with several species known to live in excess of 30 years. Twenty-three species have been recorded in Venezuela.

- Brown noddy, Anous stolidus
- Black noddy, Anous minutus
- Black skimmer, Rynchops niger
- Black-legged kittiwake, Rissa tridactyla (V)
- Black-headed gull, Chroicocephalus ridibundus (V)
- Laughing gull, Leucophaeus atricilla
- Franklin's gull, Leucophaeus pipixcan (V)
- Ring-billed gull, Larus delawarensis (V)
- Great black-backed gull, Larus marinus (U)
- Kelp gull, Larus dominicanus (V)
- Lesser black-backed gull, Larus fuscus (V)
- Herring gull, Larus argentatus (V)
- Sooty tern, Onychoprion fuscatus
- Bridled tern, Onychoprion anaethetus
- Least tern, Sternula antillarum
- Yellow-billed tern, Sternula superciliaris
- Large-billed tern, Phaetusa simplex
- Gull-billed tern, Gelochelidon nilotica
- Caspian tern, Hydroprogne caspia
- Black tern, Chlidonias niger
- Common tern, Sterna hirundo
- Roseate tern, Sterna dougallii
- Sandwich tern, Thalasseus sandvicensis
- Royal tern, Thalasseus maximus

== Sunbittern ==
Order: Eurypygiformes Family: Eurypygidae

The sunbittern is a bittern-like bird of tropical regions of the Americas and the sole member of the family Eurypygidae (sometimes spelled Eurypigidae) and genus Eurypyga.

- Sunbittern, Eurypyga helias

== Tropicbirds ==
Order: Phaethontiformes Family: Phaethontidae

Tropicbirds are slender white birds of tropical oceans with exceptionally long central tail feathers. Their heads and long wings have black markings. Two species have been recorded in Venezuela.

- Red-billed tropicbird, Phaethon aethereus
- White-tailed tropicbird, Phaethon lepturus (U)

== Albatrosses ==
Order: Procellariiformes Family: Diomedeidae

The albatrosses are among the largest of flying birds, and the great albatrosses from the genus Diomedea have the largest wingspans of any extant birds. One species has been recorded in Venezuela.

- Yellow-nosed albatross, Thalassarche chlororhynchos (V)

== Southern storm-petrels ==
Order: Procellariiformes Family: Oceanitidae

The storm-petrels are the smallest seabirds, relatives of the petrels, feeding on planktonic crustaceans and small fish picked from the surface, typically while hovering. The flight is fluttering and sometimes bat-like. Until 2018, this family's species were included with the other storm-petrels in family Hydrobatidae. One species has been recorded in Venezuela.

- Wilson's storm-petrel, Oceanites oceanicus (V)

== Northern storm-petrels ==
Order: Procellariiformes Family: Hydrobatidae

Though the members of this family are similar in many respects to the southern storm-petrels, including their general appearance and habits, there are enough genetic differences to warrant their placement in a separate family. One species has been recorded in Venezuela.

- Leach's storm-petrel, Hydrobates leucorhous

== Shearwaters and petrels ==
Order: Procellariiformes Family: Procellariidae

The procellariids are the main group of medium-sized "true petrels", characterized by united nostrils with medium septum and a long outer functional primary. Four species have been recorded in Venezuela.

- Black-capped petrel, Pterodroma hasitata (U)
- Cory's shearwater, Calonectris diomedea (U)
- Great shearwater, Ardenna gravis (V)
- Audubon's shearwater, Puffinus lherminieri

== Storks ==
Order: Ciconiiformes Family: Ciconiidae

Storks are large, long-legged, long-necked, wading birds with long, stout bills. Storks are mute, but bill-clattering is an important mode of communication at the nest. Their nests can be large and may be reused for many years. Many species are migratory. Three species have been recorded in Venezuela.

- Maguari stork, Ciconia maguari
- Jabiru, Jabiru mycteria
- Wood stork, Mycteria americana

== Frigatebirds ==
Order: Suliformes Family: Fregatidae

Frigatebirds are large seabirds usually found over tropical oceans. They are large, black-and-white, or completely black, with long wings and deeply forked tails. The males have colored inflatable throat pouches. They do not swim or walk and cannot take off from a flat surface. Having the largest wingspan-to-body-weight ratio of any bird, they are essentially aerial, able to stay aloft for more than a week. One species has been recorded in Venezuela.

- Magnificent frigatebird, Fregata magnificens

== Boobies ==
Order: Suliformes Family: Sulidae

The sulids comprise the gannets and boobies. Both groups are medium to large coastal seabirds that plunge-dive for fish. Three species have been recorded in Venezuela.

- Masked booby, Sula dactylatra
- Red-footed booby, Sula sula
- Brown booby, Sula leucogaster

== Anhingas ==
Order: Suliformes Family: Anhingidae

Anhingas are often called "snake-birds" because of their long thin neck, which gives a snake-like appearance when they swim with their bodies submerged. The males have black and dark-brown plumage, an erectile crest on the nape, and a larger bill than the female. The females have much paler plumage especially on the neck and underparts. The darters have completely webbed feet and their legs are short and set far back on the body. Their plumage is somewhat permeable, like that of cormorants, and they spread their wings to dry after diving. One species has been recorded in Venezuela.

- Anhinga, Anhinga anhinga

== Cormorants ==
Order: Suliformes Family: Phalacrocoracidae

Phalacrocoracidae is a family of medium to large coastal, fish-eating seabirds that includes cormorants and shags. Plumage coloration varies, with the majority having mainly dark plumage, some species being black-and-white, and a few being colorful. One species has been recorded in Venezuela.

- Neotropic cormorant, Phalacrocorax brasilianus

== Pelicans ==
Order: Pelecaniformes Family: Pelecanidae

Pelicans are large water birds with a distinctive pouch under their beak. As with other members of the order Pelecaniformes, they have webbed feet with four toes. One species has been recorded in Venezuela.

- Brown pelican, Pelecanus occidentalis

== Herons ==
Order: Pelecaniformes Family: Ardeidae

The family Ardeidae contains the bitterns, herons, and egrets. Herons and egrets are medium to large wading birds with long necks and legs. Bitterns tend to be shorter necked and more wary. Members of Ardeidae fly with their necks retracted, unlike other long-necked birds such as storks, ibises, and spoonbills. Twenty-two species have been recorded in Venezuela.

- Rufescent tiger-heron, Tigrisoma lineatum
- Fasciated tiger-heron, Tigrisoma fasciatum
- Boat-billed heron, Cochlearius cochlearius
- Agami heron, Agamia agami
- Zigzag heron, Zebrilus undulatus
- Stripe-backed bittern, Ixobrychus involucris
- Least bittern, Ixobrychus exilis
- Pinnated bittern, Botaurus pinnatus
- Capped heron, Pilherodius pileatus
- Whistling heron, Syrigma sibilatrix
- Little blue heron, Egretta caerulea
- Tricolored heron, Egretta tricolor
- Reddish egret, Egretta rufescens
- Snowy egret, Egretta thula
- Yellow-crowned night-heron, Nyctanassa violacea
- Black-crowned night-heron, Nycticorax nycticorax
- Striated heron, Butorides striata
- Green heron, Butorides virescens
- Cattle egret, Ardea ibis
- Great egret, Ardea alba
- Great blue heron, Ardea herodias
- Cocoi heron, Ardea cocoi

== Ibises ==
Order: Pelecaniformes Family: Threskiornithidae

Threskiornithidae is a family of large terrestrial and wading birds which includes the ibises and spoonbills. They have long, broad wings with 11 primary and about 20 secondary feathers. They are strong fliers and despite their size and weight, very capable soarers. Eight species have been recorded in Venezuela.

- White ibis, Eudocimus albus
- Scarlet ibis, Eudocimus ruber
- Glossy ibis, Plegadis falcinellus
- Sharp-tailed ibis, Cercibis oxycerca
- Green ibis, Mesembrinibis cayennensis
- Bare-faced ibis, Phimosus infuscatus
- Buff-necked ibis, Theristicus caudatus
- Roseate spoonbill, Platalea ajaja

== New World vultures ==
Order: Cathartiformes Family: Cathartidae

The New World vultures are not closely related to Old World vultures, but superficially resemble them because of convergent evolution. Like the Old World vultures, they are scavengers. However, unlike Old World vultures, which find carcasses by sight, New World vultures have a good sense of smell with which they locate carrion. Six species have been recorded in Venezuela.

- King vulture, Sarcoramphus papa
- Andean condor, Vultur gryphus
- Black vulture, Coragyps atratus
- Turkey vulture, Cathartes aura
- Lesser yellow-headed vulture, Cathartes burrovianus
- Greater yellow-headed vulture, Cathartes melambrotus

== Osprey ==
Order: Accipitriformes Family: Pandionidae

The family Pandionidae contains only one species, the osprey. The osprey is a medium-large raptor which is a specialist fish-eater with a worldwide distribution.

- Osprey, Pandion haliaetus

== Hawks ==
Order: Accipitriformes Family: Accipitridae

Accipitridae is a family of birds of prey which includes hawks, eagles, kites, harriers, and Old World vultures. These birds have powerful hooked beaks for tearing flesh from their prey, strong legs, powerful talons, and keen eyesight. Forty-six species have been recorded in Venezuela.

- Pearl kite, Gampsonyx swainsonii
- White-tailed kite, Elanus leucurus
- Hook-billed kite, Chondrohierax uncinatus
- Gray-headed kite, Leptodon cayanensis
- Swallow-tailed kite, Elanoides forficatus
- Crested eagle, Morphnus guianensis
- Harpy eagle, Harpia harpyja
- Black hawk-eagle, Spizaetus tyrannus
- Black-and-white hawk-eagle, Spizaetus melanoleucus
- Ornate hawk-eagle, Spizaetus ornatus
- Black-and-chestnut eagle, Spizaetus isidori
- Black-collared hawk, Busarellus nigricollis
- Snail kite, Rostrhamus sociabilis
- Slender-billed kite, Helicolestes hamatus
- Double-toothed kite, Harpagus bidentatus
- Rufous-thighed kite, Harpagus diodon (V)
- Mississippi kite, Ictinia mississippiensis (V)
- Plumbeous kite, Ictinia plumbea
- Gray-bellied hawk, Accipiter poliogaster
- Sharp-shinned hawk, Accipiter striatus
- Bicolored hawk, Astur bicolor
- Northern harrier, Circus hudsonius (V)
- Long-winged harrier, Circus buffoni
- Tiny hawk, Microspizias superciliosus
- Semicollared hawk, Microspizias collaris
- Crane hawk, Geranospiza caerulescens
- Slate-colored hawk, Buteogallus schistaceus
- Common black hawk, Buteogallus anthracinus
- Rufous crab hawk, Buteogallus aequinoctialis
- Savanna hawk, Buteogallus meridionalis
- Great black hawk, Buteogallus urubitinga
- Solitary eagle, Buteogallus solitarius
- Roadside hawk, Rupornis magnirostris
- Harris's hawk, Parabuteo unicinctus
- White-rumped hawk, Parabuteo leucorrhous
- White-tailed hawk, Geranoaetus albicaudatus
- Black-chested buzzard-eagle, Geranoaetus melanoleucus
- White hawk, Pseudastur albicollis
- Black-faced hawk, Leucopternis melanops
- Gray-lined hawk, Buteo nitidus
- Broad-winged hawk, Buteo platypterus
- White-throated hawk, Buteo albigula
- Short-tailed hawk, Buteo brachyurus
- Swainson's hawk, Buteo swainsoni
- Zone-tailed hawk, Buteo albonotatus
- Red-tailed hawk, Buteo jamaicensis (U)

== Barn owls ==
Order: Strigiformes Family: Tytonidae

Banowls are medium to large owls with large heads and characteristic heart-shaped faces. They have long strong legs with powerful talons. One species has been recorded in Venezuela.

- American barn owl, Tyto furcata

== Owls ==
Order: Strigiformes Family: Strigidae

The typical owls are small to large solitary nocturnal birds of prey. They have large forward-facing eyes and ears, a hawk-like beak, and a conspicuous circle of feathers around each eye called a facial disk. Twenty-one species have been recorded in Venezuela.

- White-throated screech-owl, Megascops albogularis
- Tropical screech-owl, Megascops choliba
- Rufescent screech-owl, Megascops ingens
- Cinnamon screech-owl, Megascops petersoni
- Foothill screech-owl, Megascops roraimae
- Tawny-bellied screech-owl, Megascops watsonii
- Crested owl, Lophostrix cristata
- Spectacled owl, Pulsatrix perspicillata
- Tropical horned owl, Bubo nacurutu
- Mottled owl, Strix virgata
- Black-and-white owl, Strix nigrolineata
- Black-banded owl, Strix huhula
- Rufous-banded owl, Strix albitarsis
- Andean pygmy-owl, Glaucidium jardinii
- Amazonian pygmy-owl, Glaucidium hardyi
- Ferruginous pygmy-owl, Glaucidium brasilianum
- Burrowing owl, Athene cunicularia
- Buff-fronted owl, Aegolius harrisii
- Striped owl, Asio clamator
- Stygian owl, Asio stygius
- Short-eared owl, Asio flammeus

== Trogons ==
Order: Trogoniformes Family: Trogonidae

The family Trogonidae includes trogons and quetzals. Found in tropical woodlands worldwide, they feed on insects and fruit, and their broad bills and weak legs reflect their diet and arboreal habits. Although their flight is fast, they are reluctant to fly any distance. Trogons have soft, often colorful, feathers with distinctive male and female plumage. Twelve species have been recorded Venezuela.

- Pavonine quetzal, Pharomachrus pavoninus
- Golden-headed quetzal, Pharomachrus auriceps
- White-tipped quetzal, Pharomachrus fulgidus
- Crested quetzal, Pharomachrus antisianus
- Black-tailed trogon, Trogon melanurus
- Green-backed trogon, Trogon viridis
- Gartered violaceous-trogon, Trogon caligatus
- Amazonian violaceous-trogon, Trogon ramonianus
- Guianan violaceous-trogon, Trogon violaceus
- Amazonian black-throated trogon, Trogon rufus
- Collared trogon, Trogon collaris
- Masked trogon, Trogon personatus

== Motmots ==
Order: Coraciiformes Family: Momotidae

The motmots have colorful plumage and long, graduated tails which they display by waggling back and forth. In most of the species, the barbs near the ends of the two longest (central) tail feathers are weak and fall off, leaving a length of bare shaft and creating a racket-shaped tail. Two species have been recorded in Venezuela.

- Whooping motmot, Momotus subrufescens
- Amazonian motmot, Momotus momota

== Kingfishers ==
Order: Coraciiformes Family: Alcedinidae

Kingfishers are medium-sized birds with large heads, long, pointed bills, short legs, and stubby tails. Six species have been recorded in Venezuela.

- Ringed kingfisher, Megaceryle torquata
- Belted kingfisher, Megaceryle alcyon
- Amazon kingfisher, Chloroceryle amazona
- American pygmy kingfisher, Chloroceryle aenea
- Green kingfisher, Chloroceryle americana
- Green-and-rufous kingfisher, Chloroceryle inda

== Jacamars ==
Order: Galbuliformes Family: Galbulidae

The jacamars are near passerine birds from tropical South America, with a range that extends up to Mexico. They feed on insects caught on the wing, and are glossy, elegant birds with long bills and tails. In appearance and behavior they resemble the Old World bee-eaters, although they are more closely related to puffbirds. Eight species have been recorded in Venezuela.

- Brown jacamar, Brachygalba lugubris
- Pale-headed jacamar, Brachygalba goeringi
- Yellow-billed jacamar, Galbula albirostris
- Rufous-tailed jacamar, Galbula ruficauda
- Green-tailed jacamar, Galbula galbula
- Bronzy jacamar, Galbula leucogastra
- Paradise jacamar, Galbula dea
- Great jacamar, Jacamerops aureus

== Puffbirds ==
Order: Galbuliformes Family: Bucconidae

The puffbirds are related to the jacamars and have the same range, but lack the iridescent colors of that family. They are mainly brown, rufous, or gray, with large heads and flattened bills with hooked tips. The loose abundant plumage and short tails makes them look stout and puffy, giving rise to the English common name of the family. Fifteen species have been recorded in Venezuela.

- White-necked puffbird, Notharchus hyperrhynchus
- Guianan puffbird, Notharchus macrorhynchos
- Brown-banded puffbird, Notharchus ordii
- Pied puffbird, Notharchus tectus
- Chestnut-capped puffbird, Bucco macrodactylus
- Spotted puffbird, Bucco tamatia
- Collared puffbird, Bucco capensis
- Russet-throated puffbird, Hypnelus ruficollis
- White-chested puffbird, Malacoptila fusca
- Moustached puffbird, Malacoptila mystacalis
- Rusty-breasted nunlet, Nonnula rubecula
- Black nunbird, Monasa atra
- Black-fronted nunbird, Monasa nigrifrons
- White-fronted nunbird, Monasa morphoeus
- Swallow-winged puffbird, Chelidoptera tenebrosa

== New World barbets ==
Order: Piciformes Family: Capitonidae

The barbets are plump birds, with short necks and large heads. They get their name from the bristles which fringe their heavy bills. Most species are brightly colored. Three species have been recorded in Venezuela.

- Black-spotted barbet, Capito niger
- Gilded barbet, Capito auratus
- Red-headed barbet, Eubucco bourcierii

== Toucans ==
Order: Piciformes Family: Ramphastidae

Toucans are near passerine birds from the Neotropics. They are brightly marked and have enormous, colorful bills which in some species amount to half their body length. Sixteen species have been recorded in Venezuela.

- Yellow-throated toucan, Ramphastos ambiguus
- White-throated toucan, Ramphastos tucanus
- Keel-billed toucan, Ramphastos sulfuratus
- Channel-billed toucan, Ramphastos vitellinus
- Southern emerald-toucanet, Aulacorhynchus albivitta
- Groove-billed toucanet, Aulacorhynchus sulcatus
- Tepui toucanet, Aulacorhynchus whitelianus
- Crimson-rumped toucanet, Aulacorhynchus haematopygus
- Black-billed mountain-toucan, Andigena nigrirostris
- Guianan toucanet, Selenidera culik
- Tawny-tufted toucanet, Selenidera nattereri
- Green aracari, Pteroglossus viridis
- Collared aracari, Pteroglossus torquatus
- Black-necked aracari, Pteroglossus aracari
- Many-banded aracari, Pteroglossus pluricinctus
- Ivory-billed aracari, Pteroglossus azara

== Woodpeckers ==
Order: Piciformes Family: Picidae

Woodpeckers are small to medium-sized birds with chisel-like beaks, short legs, stiff tails, and long tongues used for capturing insects. Some species have feet with two toes pointing forward and two backward, while several species have only three toes. Many woodpeckers have the habit of tapping noisily on tree trunks with their beaks. Twenty-six species have been recorded in Venezuela.

- Golden-spangled piculet, Picumnus exilis
- Scaled piculet, Picumnus squamulatus
- White-bellied piculet, Picumnus spilogaster
- Olivaceous piculet, Picumnus olivaceus
- Chestnut piculet, Picumnus cinnamomeus
- Yellow-tufted woodpecker, Melanerpes cruentatus
- Red-crowned woodpecker, Melanerpes rubricapillus
- Smoky-brown woodpecker, Dryobates fumigatus
- Red-rumped woodpecker, Dryobates kirkii
- Golden-collared woodpecker, Dryobates cassini
- Little woodpecker, Dryobates passerinus
- Yellow-vented woodpecker, Dryobates dignus
- Red-stained woodpecker, Dryobates affinis
- Powerful woodpecker, Campephilus pollens
- Red-necked woodpecker, Campephilus rubricollis
- Crimson-crested woodpecker, Campephilus melanoleucos
- Lineated woodpecker, Dryocopus lineatus
- Ringed woodpecker, Celeus torquatus
- Variable woodpecker, Celeus undatus
- Cream-colored woodpecker, Celeus flavus
- Chestnut woodpecker, Celeus elegans
- Yellow-throated woodpecker, Piculus flavigula
- Golden-green woodpecker, Piculus chrysochloros
- Golden-olive woodpecker, Colaptes rubiginosus
- Crimson-mantled woodpecker, Colaptes rivolii
- Spot-breasted woodpecker, Colaptes punctigula

== Falcons ==
Order: Falconiformes Family: Falconidae

Falconidae is a family of diurnal birds of prey. They differ from hawks, eagles, and kites in that they kill with their beaks instead of their talons. Fifteen species have been recorded in Venezuela.

- Laughing falcon, Herpetotheres cachinnans
- Barred forest-falcon, Micrastur ruficollis
- Lined forest-falcon, Micrastur gilvicollis
- Slaty-backed forest-falcon, Micrastur mirandollei
- Collared forest-falcon, Micrastur semitorquatus
- Crested caracara, Caracara plancus
- Red-throated caracara, Ibycter americanus
- Black caracara, Daptrius ater
- Yellow-headed caracara, Milvago chimachima
- American kestrel, Falco sparverius
- Merlin, Falco columbarius
- Bat falcon, Falco rufigularis
- Orange-breasted falcon, Falco deiroleucus
- Aplomado falcon, Falco femoralis
- Peregrine falcon, Falco peregrinus

== Old World parrots ==
Order: Psittaciformes Family: Psittaculidae.

Characteristic features of parrots include a strong curved bill, an upright stance, strong legs, and clawed zygodactyl feet. Many parrots are vividly colored, and some are multi-colored. Old World parrots are found from Africa east across south and southeast Asia and Oceania to Australia and New Zealand. One species has been recorded in Venezuela.

- Rose-ringed parakeet, Psittacula krameri (I)

== New World and African parrots ==
Order: Psittaciformes Family: Psittacidae.

Parrots are small to large birds with a characteristic curved beak. Their upper mandibles have slight mobility in the joint with the skull and they have a generally erect stance. All parrots are zygodactyl, having the four toes on each foot placed two at the front and two to the back. Forty-seven species have been recorded in Venezuela.

- Lilac-tailed parrotlet, Touit batavicus
- Scarlet-shouldered parrotlet, Touit huetii
- Blue-fronted parrotlet, Touit dilectissimus
- Sapphire-rumped parrotlet, Touit purpuratus
- Barred parakeet, Bolborhynchus lineola
- Tepui parrotlet, Nannopsittaca panychlora
- Orange-chinned parakeet, Brotogeris jugularis
- Cobalt-winged parakeet, Brotogeris cyanoptera
- Golden-winged parakeet, Brotogeris chrysoptera
- Rusty-faced parrot, Hapalopsittaca amazonina
- Saffron-headed parrot, Pyrilia pyrilia
- Orange-cheeked parrot, Pyrilia barrabandi
- Caica parrot, Pyrilia caica
- Dusky parrot, Pionus fuscus
- Red-billed parrot, Pionus sordidus
- Speckle-faced parrot, Pionus tumultuosus
- Blue-headed parrot, Pionus menstruus
- Bronze-winged parrot, Pionus chalcopterus
- Festive amazon, Amazona festiva
- Red-lored amazon, Amazona autumnalis
- Blue-cheeked amazon, Amazona dufresniana
- Yellow-crowned amazon, Amazona ochrocephala
- Yellow-shouldered amazon, Amazona barbadensis
- Mealy amazon, Amazona farinosa
- Orange-winged amazon, Amazona amazonica
- Scaly-naped amazon, Amazona mercenarius
- Dusky-billed parrotlet, Forpus modestus
- Spectacled parrotlet, Forpus conspicillatus
- Green-rumped parrotlet, Forpus passerinus
- Black-headed parrot, Pionites melanocephalus
- Red-fan parrot, Deroptyus accipitrinus
- Painted parakeet, Pyrrhura picta
- Fiery-shouldered parakeet, Pyrrhura egregia
- Maroon-tailed parakeet, Pyrrhura melanura
- Red-eared parakeet, Pyrrhura hoematotis (E)
- Rose-headed parakeet, Pyrrhura rhodocephala (E)
- Brown-throated parakeet, Eupsittula pertinax
- Red-bellied macaw, Orthopsittaca manilatus
- Blue-and-yellow macaw, Ara ararauna
- Chestnut-fronted macaw, Ara severus
- Military macaw, Ara militaris
- Scarlet macaw, Ara macao
- Red-and-green macaw, Ara chloropterus
- Blue-crowned parakeet, Thectocercus acuticaudatus
- Red-shouldered macaw, Diopsittaca nobilis
- Scarlet-fronted parakeet, Psittacara wagleri
- White-eyed parakeet, Psittacara leucophthalmus

== Antbirds ==
Order: Passeriformes Family: Thamnophilidae

The antbirds are a large family of small passerine birds of subtropical and tropical Central and South America. They are forest birds which tend to feed on insects at or near the ground. A sizable minority of them specialize in following columns of army ants to eat small invertebrates that leave their hiding places to flee from the ants. Many species lack bright color; brown, black, and white being the dominant tones. Seventy-one species have been recorded in Venezuela.

- Rufous-rumped antwren, Euchrepomis callinota
- Ash-winged antwren, Euchrepomis spodioptila
- Fasciated antshrike, Cymbilaimus lineatus
- Black-throated antshrike, Frederickena viridis
- Great antshrike, Taraba major
- Black-crested antshrike, Sakesphorus canadensis
- Barred antshrike, Thamnophilus doliatus
- Bar-crested antshrike, Thamnophilus multistriatus
- Black-crowned antshrike, Thamnophilus atrinucha
- Mouse-colored antshrike, Thamnophilus murinus
- Blackish-gray antshrike, Thamnophilus nigrocinereus
- Northern slaty-antshrike, Thamnophilus punctatus
- White-shouldered antshrike, Thamnophilus aethiops
- Black-backed antshrike, Thamnophilus melanonotus
- Amazonian antshrike, Thamnophilus amazonicus
- Streak-backed antshrike, Thamnophilus insignis
- Pearly antshrike, Megastictus margaritatus
- Recurve-billed bushbird, Clytoctantes alixii
- Russet antshrike, Thamnistes anabatinus
- Plain antvireo, Dysithamnus mentalis
- White-streaked antvireo, Dysithamnus leucostictus
- Spot-tailed antwren, Herpsilochmus sticturus
- Todd's antwren, Herpsilochmus stictocephalus
- Spot-backed antwren, Herpsilochmus dorsimaculatus
- Roraiman antwren, Herpsilochmus roraimae
- Rusty-winged antwren, Herpsilochmus rufimarginatus
- Dusky-throated antshrike, Thamnomanes ardesiacus
- Cinereous antshrike, Thamnomanes caesius
- Rufous-bellied antwren, Isleria guttata
- Spot-winged antshrike, Pygiptila stellaris
- Brown-bellied stipplethroat, Epinecrophylla gutturalis
- Rufous-backed stipplethroat, Epinecrophylla haematonota
- Pygmy antwren, Myrmotherula brachyura
- Yellow-throated antwren, Myrmotherula ambigua
- Guianan streaked-antwren, Myrmotherula surinamensis
- Amazonian streaked-antwren, Myrmotherula multostriata
- Cherrie's antwren, Myrmotherula cherriei
- White-flanked antwren, Myrmotherula axillaris
- Slaty antwren, Myrmotherula schisticolor
- Long-winged antwren, Myrmotherula longipennis
- Plain-winged antwren, Myrmotherula behni
- Gray antwren, Myrmotherula menetriesii
- Banded antbird, Dichrozona cincta
- White-fringed antwren, Formicivora grisea
- Klages's antbird, Drymophila klagesi
- Guianan warbling-antbird, Hypocnemis cantator
- Imeri warbling-antbird, Hypocnemis flavescens
- Dusky antbird, Cercomacroides tyrannina
- Gray antbird, Cercomacra cinerascens
- Jet antbird, Cercomacra nigricans
- White-browed antbird, Myrmoborus leucophrys
- Black-faced antbird, Myrmoborus myotherinus
- Black-chinned antbird, Hypocnemoides melanopogon
- Silvered antbird, Sclateria naevia
- Black-headed antbird, Percnostola rufifrons
- Roraiman antbird, Myrmelastes saturatus
- Spot-winged antbird, Myrmelastes leucostigma
- Caura antbird, Myrmelastes caurensis
- White-bellied antbird, Myrmeciza longipes
- Magdalena antbird, Sipia palliata
- Ferruginous-backed antbird, Myrmoderus ferrugineus
- Blue-lored antbird, Hafferia immaculata
- Yapacana antbird, Aprositornis disjuncta
- Black-throated antbird, Myrmophylax atrothorax
- Gray-bellied antbird, Ammonastes pelzelni
- Wing-banded antbird, Myrmornis torquata
- White-plumed antbird, Pithys albifrons
- Rufous-throated antbird, Gymnopithys rufigula
- Spot-backed antbird, Hylophylax naevius
- Dot-backed antbird, Hylophylax punctulatus
- Common scale-backed antbird, Willisornis poecilinotus
- Reddish-winged bare-eye, Phlegopsis erythroptera

== Antpittas ==
Order: Passeriformes Family: Grallariidae

Antpittas resemble the true pittas with strong, longish legs, very short tails, and stout bills. Eighteen species have been recorded in Venezuela.

- Undulated antpitta, Grallaria squamigera
- Great antpitta, Grallaria excelsa (E)
- Variegated antpitta, Grallaria varia
- Scaled antpitta, Grallaria guatimalensis
- Tachira antpitta, Grallaria chthonia (E)
- Plain-backed antpitta, Grallaria haplonota
- Chestnut-crowned antpitta, Grallaria ruficapilla
- Gray-naped antpitta, Grallaria griseonucha (E)
- Perija antpitta, Grallaria saltuensis
- Muisca antpitta, Grallaria rufula
- Scallop-breasted antpitta, Grallaricula loricata (E)
- Hooded antpitta, Grallaricula cucullata
- Rusty-breasted antpitta, Grallaricula ferrugineipectus
- Slate-crowned antpitta, Grallaricula nana
- Sucre antpitta, Grallaricula cumanensis (E)
- Spotted antpitta, Hylopezus macularius
- Thrush-like antpitta, Myrmothera campanisona
- Tepui antpitta, Myrmothera simplex

== Tapaculos ==
Order: Passeriformes Family: Rhinocryptidae

The tapaculos are small suboscine passeriform birds with numerous species in South and Central America. They are terrestrial species that fly only poorly on their short wings. They have strong legs, well-suited to their habitat of grassland or forest undergrowth. The tail is cocked and pointed towards the head. Eight species have been recorded in Venezuela.

- Ocellated tapaculo, Acropternis orthonyx
- Ash-colored tapaculo, Myornis senilis
- White-crowned tapaculo, Scytalopus atratus
- Blackish tapaculo, Scytalopus latrans
- Caracas tapaculo, Scytalopus caracae (E)
- Pale-bellied tapaculo, Scytalopus griseicollis
- Perija tapaculo, Scytalopus perijanus
- Merida tapaculo, Scytalopus meridanus (E)

== Antthrushes ==
Order: Passeriformes Family: Formicariidae

The ground antbirds are a group comprising the antthrushes and antpittas. Antthrushes resemble small rails while antpittas resemble the true pittas with strong, longish legs, very short tails, and stout bills. Five species have been recorded in Venezuela.

- Rufous-capped antthrush, Formicarius colma
- Black-faced antthrush, Formicarius analis
- Rufous-breasted antthrush, Formicarius rufipectus
- Short-tailed antthrush, Chamaeza campanisona
- Schwartz's antthrush, Chamaeza turdina

== Ovenbirds ==
Order: Passeriformes Family: Furnariidae

Ovenbirds comprise a large family of small sub-oscine passerine bird species found in Central and South America. They are a diverse group of insectivores which gets its name from the elaborate "oven-like" clay nests built by some species, although others build stick nests or nest in tunnels or clefts in rock. The woodcreepers are brownish birds which maintain an upright vertical posture, supported by their stiff tail vanes. They feed mainly on insects taken from tree trunks. Eighty-nine species have been recorded in Venezuela.

- South American leaftosser, Sclerurus obscurior
- Short-billed leaftosser, Sclerurus rufigularis
- Black-tailed leaftosser, Sclerurus caudacutus
- Gray-throated leaftosser, Sclerurus albigularis
- Spot-throated woodcreeper, Certhiasomus stictolaemus
- Olivaceous woodcreeper, Sittasomus griseicapillus
- Mournful long-tailed woodcreeper, Deconychura pallida
- Tyrannine woodcreeper, Dendrocincla tyrannina
- White-chinned woodcreeper, Dendrocincla merula
- Ruddy woodcreeper, Dendrocincla homochroa
- Plain-brown woodcreeper, Dendrocincla fuliginosa
- Wedge-billed woodcreeper, Glyphorynchus spirurus
- Cinnamon-throated woodcreeper, Dendrexetastes rufigula
- Long-billed woodcreeper, Nasica longirostris
- Northern barred-woodcreeper, Dendrocolaptes sanctithomae
- Amazonian barred-woodcreeper, Dendrocolaptes certhia
- Black-banded woodcreeper, Dendrocolaptes picumnus
- Red-billed woodcreeper, Hylexetastes perrotii
- Strong-billed woodcreeper, Xiphocolaptes promeropirhynchus
- Striped woodcreeper, Xiphorhynchus obsoletus
- Chestnut-rumped woodcreeper, Xiphorhynchus pardalotus
- Ocellated woodcreeper, Xiphorhynchus ocellatus
- Cocoa woodcreeper, Xiphorhynchus susurrans
- Buff-throated woodcreeper, Xiphorhynchus guttatus
- Olive-backed woodcreeper, Xiphorhynchus triangularis
- Straight-billed woodcreeper, Dendroplex picus
- Red-billed scythebill, Campylorhamphus trochilirostris
- Curve-billed scythebill, Campylorhamphus procurvoides
- Brown-billed scythebill, Campylorhamphus pusillus
- Streak-headed woodcreeper, Lepidocolaptes souleyetii
- Montane woodcreeper, Lepidocolaptes lacrymiger
- Duida woodcreeper, Lepidocolaptes duidae
- Guianan woodcreeper, Lepidocolaptes albolineatus
- Slender-billed xenops, Xenops tenuirostris
- Northern plain-xenops, Xenops mexicanus
- Amazonian plain-xenops, Xenops genibarbis
- Streaked xenops, Xenops rutilans
- Point-tailed palmcreeper, Berlepschia rikeri
- Rufous-tailed xenops, Microxenops milleri
- Streaked tuftedcheek, Pseudocolaptes boissonneautii
- Rusty-winged barbtail, Premnornis guttuliger
- Pale-legged hornero, Furnarius leucopus
- Sharp-tailed streamcreeper, Lochmias nematura
- Chestnut-winged cinclodes, Cinclodes albidiventris
- Cinnamon-rumped foliage-gleaner, Philydor pyrrhodes
- Montane foliage-gleaner, Anabacerthia striaticollis
- Rufous-tailed foliage-gleaner, Anabacerthia ruficaudata
- White-throated foliage-gleaner, Syndactyla roraimae
- Lineated foliage-gleaner, Syndactyla subalaris
- Guttulate foliage-gleaner, Syndactyla guttulata (E)
- Buff-fronted foliage-gleaner, Dendroma rufa
- Chestnut-winged foliage-gleaner, Dendroma erythroptera
- Ruddy foliage-gleaner, Clibanornis rubiginosus
- Flammulated treehunter, Thripadectes flammulatus
- Striped treehunter, Thripadectes holostictus
- Streak-capped treehunter, Thripadectes virgaticeps
- Chestnut-crowned foliage-gleaner, Automolus rufipileatus
- Buff-throated foliage-gleaner, Automolus ochrolaemus
- Striped woodhaunter, Automolus subulatus
- Olive-backed foliage-gleaner, Automolus infuscatus
- Spotted barbtail, Premnoplex brunnescens
- White-throated barbtail, Premnoplex tatei (E)
- Pearled treerunner, Margarornis squamiger
- Andean tit-spinetail, Leptasthenura andicola
- Rufous-fronted thornbird, Phacellodomus rufifrons
- White-browed spinetail, Hellmayrea gularis
- Streak-backed canastero, Asthenes wyatti
- Ochre-browed thistletail, Asthenes coryi (E)
- Perija thistletail, Asthenes perijana
- White-chinned thistletail, Asthenes fuliginosa
- Roraiman barbtail, Roraimia adusta
- Orinoco softtail, Thripophaga cherriei
- Delta Amacuro softtail, Thripophaga amacurensis (E)
- Rusty-backed spinetail, Cranioleuca vulpina
- Crested spinetail, Cranioleuca subcristata
- Tepui spinetail, Cranioleuca demissa
- Streak-capped spinetail, Cranioleuca hellmayri
- Speckled spinetail, Cranioleuca gutturata
- Yellow-chinned spinetail, Certhiaxis cinnamomeus
- Plain-crowned spinetail, Synallaxis gujanensis
- McConnell's spinetail, Synallaxis macconnelli
- Rio Orinoco spinetail, Synallaxis beverlyae
- Pale-breasted spinetail, Synallaxis albescens
- Azara's spinetail, Synallaxis azarae
- White-whiskered spinetail, Synallaxis candei
- Rufous spinetail, Synallaxis unirufa
- Black-throated spinetail, Synallaxis castanea (E)
- Stripe-breasted spinetail, Synallaxis cinnamomea
- Ruddy spinetail, Synallaxis rutilans

== Manakins ==
Order: Passeriformes Family: Pipridae

The manakins are a family of subtropical and tropical mainland Central and South America, and Trinidad and Tobago. They are compact forest birds, the males typically being brightly colored, although the females of most species are duller and usually green-plumaged. Manakins feed on small fruits, berries and insects. Twenty-one species have been recorded in Venezuela.

- Dwarf tyrant-manakin, Tyranneutes stolzmanni
- Tiny tyrant-manakin, Tyranneutes virescens
- Saffron-crested tyrant-manakin, Neopelma chrysocephalum
- Lance-tailed manakin, Chiroxiphia lanceolata
- Blue-backed manakin, Chiroxiphia pareola
- Golden-winged manakin, Masius chrysopterus
- White-bibbed manakin, Corapipo leucorrhoa
- White-throated manakin, Corapipo gutturalis
- Olive manakin, Xenopipo uniformis
- Black manakin, Xenopipo atronitens
- Blue-capped manakin, Lepidothrix coronata
- Orange-bellied manakin, Lepidothrix suavissima
- Yellow-crowned manakin, Heterocercus flavivertex
- White-bearded manakin, Manacus manacus
- Crimson-hooded manakin, Pipra aureola
- Wire-tailed manakin, Pipra filicauda
- Striolated manakin, Machaeropterus striolatus
- Fiery-capped manakin, Machaeropterus pyrocephalus
- White-crowned manakin, Pseudopipra pipra
- Scarlet-horned manakin, Ceratopipra cornuta
- Golden-headed manakin, Ceratopipra erythrocephala

== Cotingas ==
Order: Passeriformes Family: Cotingidae

The cotingas are birds of forests or forest edges in tropical South America. Comparatively little is known about this diverse group, although all have broad bills with hooked tips, rounded wings, and strong legs. The males of many of the species are brightly colored, or decorated with plumes or wattles. Twenty-five species have been recorded in Venezuela

- Green-and-black fruiteater, Pipreola riefferii
- Barred fruiteater, Pipreola arcuata
- Golden-breasted fruiteater, Pipreola aureopectus
- Handsome fruiteater, Pipreola formosa (E)
- Red-banded fruiteater, Pipreola whitelyi
- Scaled fruiteater, Ampelioides tschudii
- Red-crested cotinga, Ampelion rubrocristatus
- Guianan red-cotinga, Phoenicircus carnifex
- Black-necked red-cotinga, Phoenicircus nigricollis
- Guianan cock-of-the-rock, Rupicola rupicola
- Andean cock-of-the-rock, Rupicola peruvianus
- Crimson fruitcrow, Haematoderus militaris (U)
- Purple-throated fruitcrow, Querula purpurata
- Red-ruffed fruitcrow, Pyroderus scutatus
- Amazonian umbrellabird, Cephalopterus ornatus
- Capuchinbird, Perissocephalus tricolor
- Blue cotinga, Cotinga nattererii
- Purple-breasted cotinga, Cotinga cotinga
- Spangled cotinga, Cotinga cayana
- Rose-collared piha, Lipaugus streptophorus
- Screaming piha, Lipaugus vociferans
- White bellbird, Procnias alba
- Bearded bellbird, Procnias averano
- Pompadour cotinga, Xipholena punicea
- Bare-necked fruitcrow, Gymnoderus foetidus

== Tityras ==
Order: Passeriformes Family: Tityridae

Tityridae are suboscine passerine birds found in forest and woodland in the Neotropics. The species in this family were formerly spread over the families Tyrannidae, Pipridae, and Cotingidae. They are small to medium-sized birds. They do not have the sophisticated vocal capabilities of the songbirds. Most, but not all, have plain coloring. Twenty-three species have been recorded in Venezuela.

- Black-crowned tityra, Tityra inquisitor
- Black-tailed tityra, Tityra cayana
- Masked tityra, Tityra semifasciata
- Varzea schiffornis, Schiffornis major
- Olivaceous schiffornis, Schiffornis olivacea
- Russet-winged schiffornis, Schiffornis stenorhyncha
- Brown-winged schiffornis, Schiffornis turdina
- Cinereous mourner, Laniocera hypopyrra
- White-browed purpletuft, Iodopleura isabellae
- Dusky purpletuft, Iodopleura fusca
- Shrike-like cotinga, Laniisoma elegans
- White-naped xenopsaris, Xenopsaris albinucha
- Green-backed becard, Pachyramphus viridis
- Barred becard, Pachyramphus versicolor
- Cinereous becard, Pachyramphus rufus
- Cinnamon becard, Pachyramphus cinnamomeus
- Chestnut-crowned becard, Pachyramphus castaneus
- White-winged becard, Pachyramphus polychopterus
- Black-and-white becard, Pachyramphus albogriseus
- Black-capped becard, Pachyramphus marginatus
- Glossy-backed becard, Pachyramphus surinamus
- One-colored becard, Pachyramphus homochrous
- Pink-throated becard, Pachyramphus minor

== Sharpbill ==
Order: Passeriformes Family: Oxyruncidae

The sharpbill is a small bird of dense forests in Central and South America. It feeds mostly on fruit but also eats insects.

- Sharpbill, Oxyruncus cristatus

== Royal flycatchers ==
Order: Passeriformes Family: Onychorhynchidae

In 2019 the SACC determined that these five species, which were formerly considered tyrant flycatchers, belonged in their own family.

- Tropical royal-flycatcher, Onychorhynchus coronatus
- Ruddy-tailed flycatcher, Terenotriccus erythrurus
- Tawny-breasted flycatcher, Myiobius villosus
- Sulphur-rumped flycatcher, Myiobius barbatus
- Black-tailed flycatcher, Myiobius atricaudus

== Tyrant flycatchers ==
Order: Passeriformes Family: Tyrannidae

Tyrant flycatchers are passerine birds which occur throughout North and South America. They superficially resemble the Old World flycatchers, but are more robust and have stronger bills. They do not have the sophisticated vocal capabilities of the songbirds. Most, but not all, have plain coloring. As the name implies, most are insectivorous. One hundred sixty-eight species have been recorded in Venezuela.

- Wing-barred piprites, Piprites chloris
- Cinnamon manakin-tyrant, Neopipo cinnamomea
- Cinnamon-crested spadebill, Platyrinchus saturatus
- White-throated spadebill, Platyrinchus mystaceus
- Golden-crowned spadebill, Platyrinchus coronatus
- Yellow-throated spadebill, Platyrinchus flavigularis
- White-crested spadebill, Platyrinchus platyrhynchos
- Rufous-headed pygmy-tyrant, Pseudotriccus ruficeps
- Ringed antpipit, Corythopis torquatus
- Marble-faced bristle-tyrant, Pogonotriccus ophthalmicus
- Variegated bristle-tyrant, Pogonotriccus poecilotis
- Venezuelan bristle-tyrant, Pogonotriccus venezuelanus (E)
- Chapman's bristle-tyrant, Pogonotriccus chapmani
- Black-fronted tyrannulet, Phylloscartes nigrifrons
- Rufous-browed tyrannulet, Phylloscartes superciliaris
- Rufous-lored tyrannulet, Phylloscartes flaviventris (E)
- Olive-striped flycatcher, Mionectes olivaceus
- Ochre-bellied flycatcher, Mionectes oleagineus
- McConnell's flycatcher, Mionectes macconnelli
- Sierra de Lema flycatcher, Mionectes roraimae
- Sepia-capped flycatcher, Leptopogon amaurocephalus
- Slaty-capped flycatcher, Leptopogon superciliaris
- Rufous-breasted flycatcher, Leptopogon rufipectus
- Black-chested tyrant, Taeniotriccus andrei
- Olivaceous flatbill, Rhynchocyclus olivaceus
- Fulvous-breasted flatbill, Rhynchocyclus fulvipectus
- Yellow-margined flatbill, Tolmomyias assimilis
- Gray-crowned flatbill, Tolmomyias poliocephalus
- Yellow-breasted flatbill, Tolmomyias flaviventris
- Yellow-olive flatbill, Tolmomyias sulphurescens
- Short-tailed pygmy-tyrant, Myiornis ecaudatus
- Scale-crested pygmy-tyrant, Lophotriccus pileatus
- Helmeted pygmy-tyrant, Lophotriccus galeatus
- Pale-eyed pygmy-tyrant, Atalotriccus pilaris
- Snethlage's tody-tyrant, Hemitriccus minor
- White-eyed tody-tyrant, Hemitriccus zosterops
- Pearly-vented tody-tyrant, Hemitriccus margaritaceiventer
- Pelzeln's tody-tyrant, Hemitriccus inornatus
- Black-throated tody-tyrant, Hemitriccus granadensis
- Rufous-crowned tody-flycatcher, Poecilotriccus ruficeps
- Ruddy tody-flycatcher, Poecilotriccus russatus
- Smoky-fronted tody-flycatcher, Poecilotriccus fumifrons
- Slate-headed tody-flycatcher, Poecilotriccus sylvia
- Spotted tody-flycatcher, Todirostrum maculatum
- Common tody-flycatcher, Todirostrum cinereum
- Maracaibo tody-flycatcher, Todirostrum viridanum (E)
- Black-headed tody-flycatcher, Todirostrum nigriceps
- Painted tody-flycatcher, Todirostrum pictum
- Cliff flycatcher, Hirundinea ferruginea
- Cinnamon flycatcher, Pyrrhomyias cinnamomeus
- Venezuelan tyrannulet, Zimmerius petersi (E)
- Spectacled tyrannulet, Zimmerius improbus
- Slender-footed tyrannulet, Zimmerius gracilipes
- Guianan tyrannulet, Zimmerius acer
- Golden-faced tyrannulet, Zimmerius chrysops
- Lesser wagtail-tyrant, Stigmatura napensis
- Slender-billed tyrannulet, Inezia tenuirostris
- Amazonian tyrannulet, Inezia subflava
- Pale-tipped tyrannulet, Inezia caudata
- Fulvous-crowned scrub-tyrant, Euscarthmus meloryphus
- Yellow-bellied elaenia, Elaenia flavogaster
- Small-billed elaenia, Elaenia parvirostris
- Slaty elaenia, Elaenia strepera
- Plain-crested elaenia, Elaenia cristata
- Lesser elaenia, Elaenia chiriquensis
- Rufous-crowned elaenia, Elaenia ruficeps
- Mountain elaenia, Elaenia frantzii
- Tepui elaenia, Elaenia olivina
- Great elaenia, Elaenia dayi
- Yellow-crowned tyrannulet, Tyrannulus elatus
- Forest elaenia, Myiopagis gaimardii
- Gray elaenia, Myiopagis caniceps
- Foothill elaenia, Myiopagis olallai
- Yellow-crowned elaenia, Myiopagis flavivertex
- Greenish elaenia, Myiopagis viridicata
- Yellow tyrannulet, Capsiempis flaveola
- White-banded tyrannulet, Mecocerculus stictopterus
- White-throated tyrannulet, Mecocerculus leucophrys
- Sulphur-bellied tyrannulet, Mecocerculus minor
- Urich's tyrannulet, Phyllomyias urichi (E)
- Sooty-headed tyrannulet, Phyllomyias griseiceps
- White-fronted tyrannulet, Acrochordopus zeledoni
- Ashy-headed tyrannulet, Tyranniscus cinereiceps
- Black-capped tyrannulet, Tyranniscus nigrocapillus
- Tawny-rumped tyrannulet, Tyranniscus uropygialis
- Venezuelan beardless-tyrannulet, Camptostoma pusillum
- Amazonian beardless-tyrannulet, Camptostoma napaeum
- Brown-capped tyrannulet, Ornithion brunneicapillus
- White-lored tyrannulet, Ornithion inerme
- Mouse-colored tyrannulet, Nesotriccus murinus
- Bearded tachuri, Polystictus pectoralis
- Crested doradito, Pseudocolopteryx sclateri
- Torrent tyrannulet, Serpophaga cinerea
- River tyrannulet, Serpophaga hypoleuca
- Agile tit-tyrant, Uromyias agilis
- Rufous-tailed attila, Attila phoenicurus (V)
- Cinnamon attila, Attila cinnamomeus
- Citron-bellied attila, Attila citriniventris
- Bright-rumped attila, Attila spadiceus
- Piratic flycatcher, Legatus leucophaius
- Large-headed flatbill, Ramphotrigon megacephalum
- Rufous-tailed flatbill, Ramphotrigon ruficauda
- Great kiskadee, Pitangus sulphuratus
- Lesser kiskadee, Philohydor lictor
- Cattle tyrant, Machetornis rixosa
- Sulphury flycatcher, Tyrannopsis sulphurea
- Boat-billed flycatcher, Megarynchus pitangua
- Golden-bellied flycatcher, Myiodynastes hemichrysus
- Sulphur-bellied flycatcher, Myiodynastes luteiventris (V)
- Streaked flycatcher, Myiodynastes maculatus
- Rusty-margined flycatcher, Myiozetetes cayanensis
- Social flycatcher, Myiozetetes similis
- Gray-capped flycatcher, Myiozetetes granadensis
- Dusky-chested flycatcher, Myiozetetes luteiventris
- Yellow-throated flycatcher, Conopias parvus
- Three-striped flycatcher, Conopias trivirgatus
- Lemon-browed flycatcher, Conopias cinchoneti
- White-bearded flycatcher, Phelpsia inornata
- Variegated flycatcher, Empidonomus varius
- Crowned slaty flycatcher, Empidonomus aurantioatrocristatus (V)
- White-throated kingbird, Tyrannus albogularis
- Tropical kingbird, Tyrannus melancholicus
- Fork-tailed flycatcher, Tyrannus savana
- Eastern kingbird, Tyrannus tyrannus
- Gray kingbird, Tyrannus dominicensis
- Grayish mourner, Rhytipterna simplex
- Pale-bellied mourner, Rhytipterna immunda
- White-rumped sirystes, Sirystes albocinereus
- Dusky-capped flycatcher, Myiarchus tuberculifer
- Swainson's flycatcher, Myiarchus swainsoni
- Venezuelan flycatcher, Myiarchus venezuelensis
- Panama flycatcher, Myiarchus panamensis
- Short-crested flycatcher, Myiarchus ferox
- Pale-edged flycatcher, Myiarchus cephalotes
- Great crested flycatcher, Myiarchus crinitus
- Brown-crested flycatcher, Myiarchus tyrannulus
- Long-tailed tyrant, Colonia colonus
- Flavescent flycatcher, Myiophobus flavicans
- Roraiman flycatcher, Myiophobus roraimae
- Bran-colored flycatcher, Myiophobus fasciatus
- Crowned chat-tyrant, Silvicultrix frontalis
- Yellow-bellied chat-tyrant, Silvicultrix diadema
- Slaty-backed chat-tyrant, Ochthoeca cinnamomeiventris
- Rufous-breasted chat-tyrant, Ochthoeca rufipectoralis
- Brown-backed chat-tyrant, Ochthoeca fumicolor
- Northern scrub-flycatcher, Sublegatus arenarum
- Amazonian scrub-flycatcher, Sublegatus obscurior
- Vermilion flycatcher, Pyrocephalus rubinus
- Pied water tyrant, Fluvicola pica
- White-headed marsh tyrant, Arundinicola leucocephala
- Riverside tyrant, Knipolegus orenocensis
- Rufous-tailed tyrant, Knipolegus poecilurus
- Amazonian black-tyrant, Knipolegus poecilocercus
- Yellow-browed tyrant, Satrapa icterophrys
- Streak-throated bush-tyrant, Myiotheretes striaticollis
- Smoky bush-tyrant, Myiotheretes fumigatus
- Drab water tyrant, Ochthornis littoralis
- Fuscous flycatcher, Cnemotriccus fuscatus
- Euler's flycatcher, Lathrotriccus euleri
- Black phoebe, Sayornis nigricans
- Acadian flycatcher, Empidonax virescens
- Willow flycatcher, Empidonax traillii
- Alder flycatcher, Empidonax alnorum
- Olive-sided flycatcher, Contopus cooperi
- Smoke-colored pewee, Contopus fumigatus
- Western wood-pewee, Contopus sordidulus
- Eastern wood-pewee, Contopus virens
- Tropical pewee, Contopus cinereus

== Vireos ==
Order: Passeriformes Family: Vireonidae

The vireos are a group of small to medium-sized passerine birds. They are typically greenish in color and resemble wood warblers apart from their heavier bills. Twenty-two species have been recorded in Venezuela.

- Rufous-browed peppershrike, Cyclarhis gujanensis
- Ashy-headed greenlet, Hylophilus pectoralis
- Scrub greenlet, Hylophilus flavipes
- Gray-chested greenlet, Hylophilus semicinereus
- Brown-headed greenlet, Hylophilus brunneiceps
- Lemon-chested greenlet, Hylophilus thoracicus
- Yellow-browed shrike-vireo, Vireolanius eximius
- Slaty-capped shrike-vireo, Vireolanius leucotis
- Rufous-fronted brownlet, Tunchiornis ferrugineifrons
- Dusky-capped greenlet, Pachysylvia hypoxantha
- Buff-cheeked greenlet, Pachysylvia muscicapina
- Golden-fronted greenlet, Pachysylvia aurantiifrons
- Rufous-naped greenlet, Pachysylvia semibrunnea
- White-eyed vireo, Vireo griseus (U)
- Yellow-throated vireo, Vireo flavifrons
- Tepui vireo, Vireo sclateri
- Philadelphia vireo, Vireo philadelphicus (V)
- Brown-capped vireo, Vireo leucophrys
- Red-eyed vireo, Vireo olivaceus
- Chivi vireo, Vireo chivi
- Yellow-green vireo, Vireo flavoviridis
- Black-whiskered vireo, Vireo altiloquus

== Jays ==
Order: Passeriformes Family: Corvidae

The family Corvidae includes crows, ravens, jays, choughs, magpies, treepies, nutcrackers, and ground jays. Corvids are above average in size among the Passeriformes, and some of the larger species show high levels of intelligence. Six species have been recorded in Venezuela.

- Black-collared jay, Cyanolyca armillata
- Violaceous jay, Cyanocorax violaceus
- Black-chested jay, Cyanocorax affinis
- Cayenne jay, Cyanocorax cayanus
- Azure-naped jay, Cyanocorax heilprini
- Green jay, Cyanocorax yncas

== Swallows ==
Order: Passeriformes Family: Hirundinidae

The family Hirundinidae is adapted to aerial feeding. They have a slender streamlined body, long pointed wings and a short bill with a wide gape. The feet are adapted to perching rather than walking, and the front toes are partially joined at the base. Nineteen species have been recorded in Venezuela.

- Blue-and-white swallow, Pygochelidon cyanoleuca
- Black-collared swallow, Pygochelidon melanoleuca
- Tawny-headed swallow, Alopochelidon fucata
- Brown-bellied swallow, Orochelidon murina
- Pale-footed swallow, Orochelidon flavipes
- White-banded swallow, Atticora fasciata
- White-thighed swallow, Atticora tibialis
- Southern rough-winged swallow, Stelgidopteryx ruficollis
- Brown-chested martin, Progne tapera
- Purple martin, Progne subis
- Caribbean martin, Progne dominicensis (V)
- Cuban martin, Progne cryptoleuca (U)
- Gray-breasted martin, Progne chalybea
- Southern martin, Progne elegans (U)
- White-winged swallow, Tachycineta albiventer
- Bank swallow, Riparia riparia
- Barn swallow, Hirundo rustica
- Cliff swallow, Petrochelidon pyrrhonota
- Cave swallow, Petrochelidon fulva (V)

== Wrens ==
Order: Passeriformes Family: Troglodytidae

The wrens are mainly small and inconspicuous except for their loud songs. These birds have short wings and thin down-turned bills. Several species often hold their tails upright. All are insectivorous. Nineteen species have been recorded in Venezuela.

- Scaly-breasted wren, Microcerculus marginatus
- Flutist wren, Microcerculus ustulatus
- Wing-banded wren, Microcerculus bambla
- Southern house-wren, Troglodytes musculus
- Mountain wren, Troglodytes solstitialis
- Tepui wren, Troglodytes rufulus
- Grass wren, Cistothorus platensis
- Merida wren, Cistothorus meridae (E)
- Stripe-backed wren, Campylorhynchus nuchalis
- Bicolored wren, Campylorhynchus griseus
- Whiskered wren, Pheugopedius mystacalis
- Coraya wren, Pheugopedius coraya
- Rufous-breasted wren, Pheugopedius rutilus
- Rufous-and-white wren, Thryophilus rufalbus
- Buff-breasted wren, Cantorchilus leucotis
- Rufous wren, Cinnycerthia unirufa
- White-breasted wood-wren, Henicorhina leucosticta
- Gray-breasted wood-wren, Henicorhina leucophrys
- Musician wren, Cyphorhinus arada

== Gnatcatchers ==
Order: Passeriformes Family: Polioptilidae

These dainty birds resemble Old World warblers in their build and habits, moving restlessly through the foliage seeking insects. The gnatcatchers and gnatwrens are mainly soft bluish gray in color and have the typical insectivore's long sharp bill. They are birds of fairly open woodland or scrub, which nest in bushes or trees. Four species have been recorded in Venezuela.

- Collared gnatwren, Microbates collaris
- Trilling gnatwren, Ramphocaenus melanurus
- Tropical gnatcatcher, Polioptila plumbea
- Rio Negro gnatcatcher, Polioptila facilis

== Donacobius ==
Order: Passeriformes Family: Donacobiidae

The black-capped donacobius is found in wet habitats from Panama across northern South America and east of the Andes to Argentina and Paraguay.

- Black-capped donacobius, Donacobius atricapilla

== Dippers ==
Order: Passeriformes Family: Cinclidae

Dippers are a group of perching birds whose habitat includes aquatic environments in the Americas, Europe and Asia. They are named for their bobbing or dipping movements. One species has been recorded in Venezuela.

- White-capped dipper, Cinclus leucocephalus

== Waxwings ==
Order: Passeriformes Family: Bombycillidae

The waxwings are a group of birds with soft silky plumage and unique red tips to some of the wing feathers. In the Bohemian and cedar waxwings, these tips look like sealing wax and give the group its name. These are arboreal birds of northern forests. They live on insects in summer and berries in winter. One species has been recorded in Venezuela.

- Cedar waxwing, Bombycilla cedrorum (V)

== Thrushes ==
Order: Passeriformes Family: Turdidae

The thrushes are a group of passerine birds that occur mainly in the Old World. They are plump, soft plumaged, small to medium-sized insectivores or sometimes omnivores, often feeding on the ground. Many have attractive songs. Twenty-four species have been recorded in Venezuela.

- Andean solitaire, Myadestes ralloides
- Orange-billed nightingale-thrush, Catharus aurantiirostris
- Slaty-backed nightingale-thrush, Catharus fuscater
- Speckled nightingale-thrush, Catharus maculatus
- Veery, Catharus fuscescens
- Gray-cheeked thrush, Catharus minimus
- Swainson's thrush, Catharus ustulatus
- Wood thrush, Hylocichla mustelina (V)
- Rufous-brown solitaire, Cichlopsis leucogenys
- Pale-eyed thrush, Turdus leucops
- Yellow-legged thrush, Turdus flavipes
- Pale-breasted thrush, Turdus leucomelas
- Cocoa thrush, Turdus fumigatus
- Hauxwell's thrush, Turdus hauxwelli (U)
- Spectacled thrush, Turdus nudigenis
- Lawrence's thrush, Turdus lawrencii
- Pantepui thrush, Turdus murinus
- Black-billed thrush, Turdus ignobilis
- Campina thrush, Turdus arthuri
- Chestnut-bellied thrush, Turdus fulviventris
- Black-hooded thrush, Turdus olivater
- Great thrush, Turdus fuscater
- Glossy-black thrush, Turdus serranus
- Gray-flanked thrush, Turdus phaeopygus

== Mockingbirds ==
Order: Passeriformes Family: Mimidae

The mimids are a family of passerine birds that includes thrashers, mockingbirds, tremblers, and the New World catbirds. These birds are notable for their vocalizations, especially their ability to mimic a wide variety of birds and other sounds heard outdoors. Their coloring tends towards dull-grays and browns. Two species have been recorded in Venezuela.

- Tropical mockingbird, Mimus gilvus
- Pearly-eyed thrasher, Margarops fuscatus (extirpated)

== Weavers ==
Order: Passeriformes Family: Ploceidae

The weavers are small passerine birds related to the finches. They are seed-eating birds with rounded conical bills. The males of many species are brightly colored, usually in red or yellow and black; some species show variation in color only in the breeding season. One species has been recorded in Venezuela.

- Village weaver, Ploceus cucullatus (I)

== Estreldids ==
Order: Passeriformes Family: Estrildidae

The estrildid finches are small passerine birds of the Old World tropics and Australasia. They are gregarious and often colonial seed eaters with short thick but pointed bills. They are all similar in structure and habits, but have wide variation in plumage colors and patterns. Two species have been recorded in Venezuela.

- Tricolored munia, Lonchura malacca (I)
- Java sparrow, Padda oryzivora (I)

== Old World sparrows ==
Order: Passeriformes Family: Passeridae

Old World sparrows are small passerine birds. In general, sparrows tend to be small, plump, brown or gray birds with short tails and short powerful beaks. Sparrows are seed eaters, but they also consume small insects. One species has been recorded in Venezuela.

- House sparrow, Passer domesticus (I)

== Pipits and wagtails ==
Order: Passeriformes Family: Motacillidae

Motacillidae is a family of small passerine birds with medium to long tails. They include the wagtails, longclaws, and pipits. They are slender ground-feeding insectivores of open country. Two species have been recorded in Venezuela.

- Yellowish pipit, Anthus chii
- Paramo pipit, Anthus bogotensis

== Finches ==
Order: Passeriformes Family: Fringillidae

Finches are seed-eating passerine birds that are small to moderately large and have a strong beak, usually conical and in some species very large. All have twelve tail feathers and nine primaries. These birds have a bouncing flight with alternating bouts of flapping and gliding on closed wings, and most sing well. Twenty species have been recorded in Venezuela.

- Andean siskin, Spinus spinescens
- Yellow-faced siskin, Spinus yarrellii (U)
- Red siskin, Spinus cucullatus
- Hooded siskin, Spinus magellanicus
- Yellow-bellied siskin, Spinus xanthogastrus
- Lesser goldfinch, Spinus psaltria
- Golden-rumped euphonia, Chlorophonia cyanocephala
- Blue-naped chlorophonia, Chlorophonia cyanea
- Chestnut-breasted chlorophonia, Chlorophonia pyrrhophrys
- Plumbeous euphonia, Euphonia plumbea
- Purple-throated euphonia, Euphonia chlorotica
- Finsch's euphonia, Euphonia finschi
- Trinidad euphonia, Euphonia trinitatis
- Golden-bellied euphonia, Euphonia chrysopasta
- White-vented euphonia, Euphonia minuta
- Violaceous euphonia, Euphonia violacea
- Thick-billed euphonia, Euphonia laniirostris
- Orange-bellied euphonia, Euphonia xanthogaster
- Golden-sided euphonia, Euphonia cayennensis
- Rufous-bellied euphonia, Euphonia rufiventris

== Thrush-tanager ==
Order: Passeriformes Family: Rhodinocichlidae

This species was historically placed in family Thraupidae, the "true" tanagers. It was placed in its own family in 2017.

- Rosy thrush-tanager, Rhodinocichla rosea

== Sparrows ==
Order: Passeriformes Family: Passerellidae

Most of the species are known as sparrows, but these birds are not closely related to the Old World sparrows which are in the family Passeridae. Many of these have distinctive head patterns. Twenty-two species have been recorded in Venezuela.

- Ashy-throated chlorospingus, Chlorospingus canigularis
- Common chlorospingus, Chlorospingus flavopectus
- Grassland sparrow, Ammodramus humeralis
- Yellow-browed sparrow, Ammodramus aurifrons
- Black-striped sparrow, Arremonops conirostris
- Tocuyo sparrow, Arremonops tocuyensis
- Perija brushfinch, Arremon perijanus
- Caracas brushfinch, Arremon phygas (E)
- Paria brushfinch, Arremon phygas (E)
- Gray-browed brushfinch, Arremon assimilis
- Golden-winged sparrow, Arremon schlegeli
- Yellow-mandibled sparrow, Arremon axillaris
- Pectoral sparrow, Arremon taciturnus
- Chestnut-capped brushfinch, Arremon brunneinucha
- Rufous-collared sparrow, Zonotrichia capensis
- Lincoln's sparrow, Melospiza lincolnii (V)
- Moustached brushfinch, Atlapetes albofrenatus
- Tepui brushfinch, Atlapetes personatus
- Ochre-breasted brushfinch, Atlapetes semirufus
- Slaty brushfinch, Atlapetes schistaceus
- Pale-naped brushfinch, Atlapetes pallidinucha
- Yellow-breasted brushfinch, Atlapetes latinuchus

== Blackbirds ==
Order: Passeriformes Family: Icteridae

The icterids are a group of small to medium-sized, often colorful, passerine birds restricted to the New World and include the grackles, New World blackbirds, and New World orioles. Most species have black as the predominant plumage color, often enlivened by yellow, orange, or red. Twenty-nine species have been recorded in Venezuela.

- Bobolink, Dolichonyx oryzivorus
- Eastern meadowlark, Sturnella magna
- Red-breasted meadowlark, Leistes militaris
- Yellow-billed cacique, Amblycercus holosericeus
- Russet-backed oropendola, Psarocolius angustifrons
- Green oropendola, Psarocolius viridis
- Crested oropendola, Psarocolius decumanus
- Olive oropendola, Psarocolius bifasciatus
- Solitary black cacique, Cacicus solitarius
- Scarlet-rumped cacique, Cacicus uropygialis
- Yellow-rumped cacique, Cacicus cela
- Mountain cacique, Cacicus chrysonotus
- Red-rumped cacique, Cacicus haemorrhous
- Venezuelan troupial, Icterus icterus
- Yellow-tailed oriole, Icterus mesomelas
- Epaulet oriole, Icterus cayanensis
- Orchard oriole, Icterus spurius
- Orange-crowned oriole, Icterus auricapillus
- Yellow-backed oriole, Icterus chrysater
- Baltimore oriole, Icterus galbula
- Yellow oriole, Icterus nigrogularis
- Giant cowbird, Molothrus oryzivorus
- Shiny cowbird, Molothrus bonariensis
- Carib grackle, Quiscalus lugubris
- Great-tailed grackle, Quiscalus mexicanus
- Velvet-fronted grackle, Lampropsar tanagrinus
- Oriole blackbird, Gymnomystax mexicanus
- Golden-tufted grackle, Macroagelaius imthurni
- Yellow-hooded blackbird, Chrysomus icterocephalus

== Wood-warblers ==
Order: Passeriformes Family: Parulidae

The wood-warblers are a group of small, often colorful, passerine birds restricted to the New World. Most are arboreal, but some are terrestrial. Most members of this family are insectivores. Fifty-one species have been recorded in Venezuela.

- Ovenbird, Seiurus aurocapilla
- Worm-eating warbler, Helmitheros vermivorum (V)
- Northern waterthrush, Parkesia noveboracensis
- Louisiana waterthrush, Parkesia motacilla
- Golden-winged warbler, Vermivora chrysoptera
- Blue-winged warbler, Vermivora cyanoptera (U)
- Black-and-white warbler, Mniotilta varia
- Prothonotary warbler, Protonotaria citrea
- Tennessee warbler, Leiothlypis peregrina
- Connecticut warbler, Oporornis agilis
- Masked yellowthroat, Geothlypis aequinoctialis
- Mourning warbler, Geothlypis philadelphia
- Kentucky warbler, Geothlypis formosa (V)
- Common yellowthroat, Geothlypis trichas (V)
- Hooded warbler, Setophaga citrina (V)
- American redstart, Setophaga ruticilla
- Cape May warbler, Setophaga tigrina
- Cerulean warbler, Setophaga cerulea
- Northern parula, Setophaga americana (V)
- Tropical parula, Setophaga pitiayumi
- Magnolia warbler, Setophaga magnolia (V)
- Bay-breasted warbler, Setophaga castanea
- Blackburnian warbler, Setophaga fusca
- Yellow warbler, Setophaga petechia
- Chestnut-sided warbler, Setophaga pensylvanica
- Blackpoll warbler, Setophaga striata
- Black-throated blue warbler, Setophaga caerulescens
- Palm warbler, Setophaga palmarum (V)
- Yellow-rumped warbler, Setophaga coronata (V)
- Yellow-throated warbler, Setophaga dominica (V)
- Prairie warbler, Setophaga discolor (V)
- Black-throated green warbler, Setophaga virens
- Citrine warbler, Myiothlypis luteoviridis
- Flavescent warbler, Myiothlypis flaveola
- Black-crested warbler, Myiothlypis nigrocristata
- Riverbank warbler, Myiothlypis rivularis
- Two-banded warbler, Myiothlypis bivittata
- Gray-throated warbler, Myiothlypis cinereicollis
- Russet-crowned warbler, Myiothlypis coronata
- Chestnut-capped warbler, Basileuterus delattrii
- Golden-crowned warbler, Basileuterus culicivorus
- Three-striped warbler, Basileuterus tristriatus
- Gray-headed warbler, Basileuterus griseiceps (E)
- Canada warbler, Cardellina canadensis
- Slate-throated whitestart, Myioborus miniatus
- White-fronted whitestart, Myioborus albifrons (E)
- Golden-fronted whitestart, Myioborus ornatus
- Paria whitestart, Myioborus pariae (E)
- White-faced whitestart, Myioborus albifacies (E)
- Saffron-breasted whitestart, Myioborus cardonai (E)
- Tepui whitestart, Myioborus castaneocapilla

== Mitrospingids ==
Order: Passeriformes Family: Mitrospingidae

Until 2017 the four species in this family were included in the family Thraupidae, the "true" tanagers.

- Olive-backed tanager, Mitrospingus oleagineus

== Cardinal grosbeaks ==
Order: Passeriformes Family: Cardinalidae

The cardinals are a family of robust, seed-eating birds with strong bills. They are typically associated with open woodland. The sexes usually have distinct plumages. Nineteen species have been recorded in Venezuela.

- Hepatic tanager, Piranga flava
- Summer tanager, Piranga rubra
- Scarlet tanager, Piranga olivacea
- White-winged tanager, Piranga leucoptera
- Red-crowned ant-tanager, Habia rubica
- Golden grosbeak, Pheucticus chrysogaster
- Black-backed grosbeak, Pheucticus aureoventris
- Rose-breasted grosbeak, Pheucticus ludovicianus
- Rose-breasted chat, Granatellus pelzelni
- Vermilion cardinal, Cardinalis phoeniceus
- Red-and-black grosbeak, Periporphyrus erythromelas
- Yellow-green grosbeak, Caryothraustes canadensis
- Carrizal seedeater, Amaurospiza carrizalensis (E)
- Blue-black grosbeak, Cyanoloxia cyanoides
- Amazonian grosbeak, Cyanoloxia rothschildii
- Ultramarine grosbeak, Cyanoloxia brissonii
- Blue grosbeak, Passerina caerulea (V)
- Indigo bunting, Passerina cyanea (V)
- Dickcissel, Spiza americana

== Tanagers ==
Order: Passeriformes Family: Thraupidae

The tanagers are a large group of small to medium-sized passerine birds restricted to the New World, mainly in the tropics. Many species are brightly colored. As a family they are omnivorous, but individual species specialize in eating fruits, seeds, insects, or other types of food. Most have short, rounded wings. One hundred twenty-nine species have been recorded in Venezuela.

- Blue-backed tanager, Cyanicterus cyanicterus
- Hooded tanager, Nemosia pileata
- White-capped tanager, Sericossypha albocristata
- Plushcap, Catamblyrhynchus diadema
- Green honeycreeper, Chlorophanes spiza
- Guira tanager, Hemithraupis guira
- Yellow-backed tanager, Hemithraupis flavicollis
- Bicolored conebill, Conirostrum bicolor
- Chestnut-vented conebill, Conirostrum speciosum
- White-eared conebill, Conirostrum leucogenys
- Blue-backed conebill, Conirostrum sitticolor
- Capped conebill, Conirostrum albifrons
- Rufous-browed conebill, Conirostrum rufum
- Stripe-tailed yellow-finch, Sicalis citrina
- Orange-fronted yellow-finch, Sicalis columbiana
- Saffron finch, Sicalis flaveola
- Grassland yellow-finch, Sicalis luteola
- Plumbeous sierra finch, Geospizopsis unicolor
- Plain-colored seedeater, Catamenia inornata
- Paramo seedeater, Catamenia homochroa
- Glossy flowerpiercer, Diglossa lafresnayii
- Merida flowerpiercer, Diglossa gloriosa (E)
- Black flowerpiercer, Diglossa humeralis
- Venezuelan flowerpiercer, Diglossa venezuelensis (E)
- White-sided flowerpiercer, Diglossa albilatera
- Scaled flowerpiercer, Diglossa duidae
- Greater flowerpiercer, Diglossa major
- Rusty flowerpiercer, Diglossa sittoides
- Bluish flowerpiercer, Diglossa caerulescens
- Warbling masked-flowerpiercer, Diglossa cyanea
- Slaty finch, Haplospiza rustica
- Blue-black grassquit, Volatinia jacarina
- Rufous-crested tanager, Creurgops verticalis
- Flame-crested tanager, Loriotus cristatus
- White-shouldered tanager, Loriotus luctuosus
- Fulvous-crested tanager, Tachyphonus surinamus
- White-lined tanager, Tachyphonus rufus
- Red-shouldered tanager, Tachyphonus phoenicius
- Gray-headed tanager, Eucometis penicillata
- Pileated finch, Coryphospingus pileatus
- Crimson-backed tanager, Ramphocelus dimidiatus
- Silver-beaked tanager, Ramphocelus carbo
- Fulvous shrike-tanager, Lanio fulvus
- Short-billed honeycreeper, Cyanerpes nitidus
- Purple honeycreeper, Cyanerpes caeruleus
- Red-legged honeycreeper, Cyanerpes cyaneus
- Swallow tanager, Tersina viridis
- White-bellied dacnis, Dacnis albiventris
- Black-faced dacnis, Dacnis lineata
- Yellow-bellied dacnis, Dacnis flaviventer
- Blue dacnis, Dacnis cayana
- Lesson's seedeater, Sporophila bouvronides
- Lined seedeater, Sporophila lineola
- Chestnut-bellied seedeater, Sporophila castaneiventris
- Ruddy-breasted seedeater, Sporophila minuta
- Chestnut-bellied seed-finch, Sporophila angolensis
- Great-billed seed-finch, Sporophila maximiliani
- Large-billed seed-finch, Sporophila crassirostris
- Gray seedeater, Sporophila intermedia
- Wing-barred seedeater, Sporophila americana
- White-naped seedeater, Sporophila fringilloides
- Black-and-white seedeater, Sporophila luctuosa
- Yellow-bellied seedeater, Sporophila nigricollis
- Slate-colored seedeater, Sporophila schistacea
- Plumbeous seedeater, Sporophila plumbea
- Buff-throated saltator, Saltator maximus
- Orinocan saltator, Saltator orenocensis
- Olive-gray saltator, Saltator olivascens
- Bluish-gray saltator, Saltator coerulescens
- Streaked saltator, Saltator striatipectus
- Slate-colored grosbeak, Saltator grossus
- Wedge-tailed grass-finch, Emberizoides herbicola
- Duida grass-finch, Emberizoides duidae (E)
- Black-headed hemispingus, Pseudospingus verticalis
- Pink-billed cnemoscopus, Cnemoscopus rubrirostris
- Slaty-backed hemispingus, Poospiza goeringi (E)
- Gray-capped hemispingus, Kleinothraupis reyi (E)
- Black-capped hemispingus, Kleinothraupis atropileus
- Oleaginous hemispingus, Sphenopsis frontalis
- Black-eared hemispingus, Sphenopsis melanotis
- Orange-headed tanager, Thlypopsis sordida
- Fulvous-headed tanager, Thlypopsis fulviceps
- Superciliaried hemispingus, Thlypopsis superciliaris
- Bananaquit, Coereba flaveola
- Yellow-faced grassquit, Tiaris olivaceus
- Dull-colored grassquit, Asemospiza obscura
- Sooty grassquit, Asemospiza fuliginosa
- Black-faced grassquit, Melanospiza bicolor
- Orange-eared tanager, Chlorochrysa calliparaea
- Masked cardinal, Paroaria nigrogenis
- Red-capped cardinal, Paroaria gularis
- Black-faced tanager, Schistochlamys melanopis
- Magpie tanager, Cissopis leverianus
- Golden-crowned tanager, Iridosornis rufivertex
- Fawn-breasted tanager, Pipraeidea melanonota
- Buff-banded mountain tanager, Dubusia taeniata
- Lacrimose mountain tanager, Anisognathus lacrymosus
- Scarlet-bellied mountain tanager, Anisognathus igniventris
- Blue-winged mountain tanager, Anisognathus somptuosus
- Hooded mountain tanager, Buthraupis montana
- Masked mountain tanager, Tephrophilus wetmorei
- Blue-capped tanager, Sporathraupis cyanocephala
- Black-chested mountain tanager, Cnemathraupis eximia
- Black-headed tanager, Stilpnia cyanoptera
- Black-hooded tanager, Stilpnia whitelyi
- Black-capped tanager, Stilpnia heinei
- Burnished-buff tanager, Stilpnia cayana
- Scrub tanager, Stilpnia vitriolina
- Masked tanager, Stilpnia nigrocincta
- Blue-necked tanager, Stilpnia cyanicollis
- Blue-and-black tanager, Tangara vassorii
- Beryl-spangled tanager, Tangara nigroviridis
- Turquoise tanager, Tangara mexicana
- Paradise tanager, Tangara chilensis
- Opal-rumped tanager, Tangara velia
- Bay-headed tanager, Tangara gyrola
- Rufous-cheeked tanager, Tangara rufigenis (E)
- Saffron-crowned tanager, Tangara xanthocephala
- Flame-faced tanager, Tangara parzudakii
- Green-and-gold tanager, Tangara schrankii
- Golden tanager, Tangara arthus
- Blue-gray tanager, Thraupis episcopus
- Glaucous tanager, Thraupis glaucocolpa
- Palm tanager, Thraupis palmarum
- Dotted tanager, Ixothraupis varia
- Speckled tanager, Ixothraupis guttata
- Yellow-bellied tanager, Ixothraupis xanthogastra
- Spotted tanager, Ixothraupis punctata

== See also ==
- List of echinoderms of Venezuela
- List of Poriferans of Venezuela
- List of introduced molluscs of Venezuela
- List of marine molluscs of Venezuela
- List of molluscs of Falcón state, Venezuela
- List of non-marine molluscs of El Hatillo Municipality, Miranda, Venezuela
- List of non-marine molluscs of Venezuela
- List of mammals of Venezuela
- List of birds
- Lists of birds by region

== Other reading ==
- Goodwin, Mary Lou (2003). Birding in Venezuela. Lynx Edicions. ISBN 978-84-87334-48-1.
