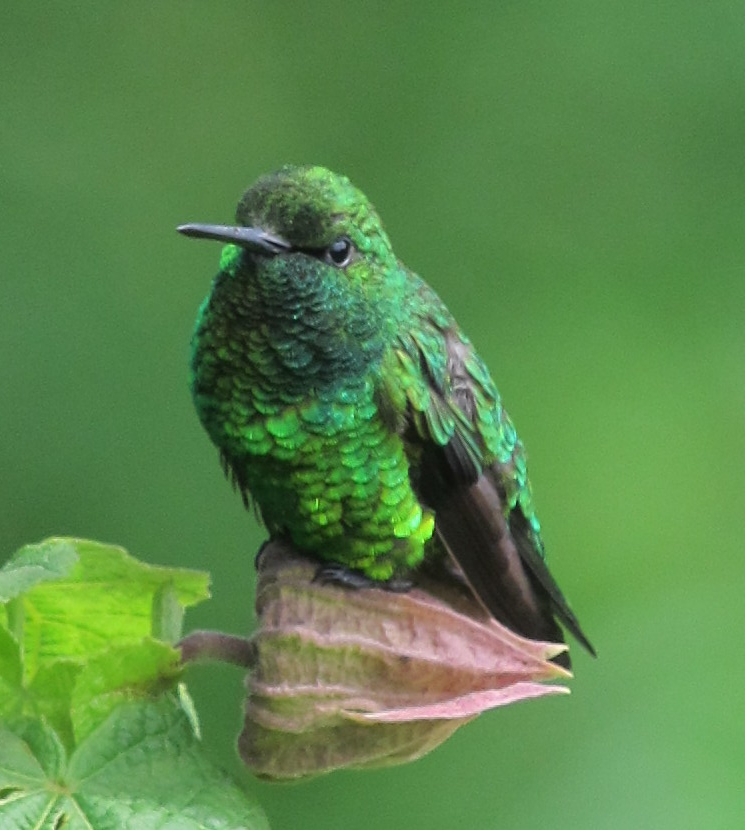
- Male in Arcabuco, Boyacá, Colombia

Conservation status
- Least Concern (IUCN 3.1)
- CITES Appendix II

Scientific classification
- Kingdom: Animalia
- Phylum: Chordata
- Class: Aves
- Clade: Strisores
- Order: Apodiformes
- Family: Trochilidae
- Genus: Chlorostilbon
- Species: C. poortmani

Binomial name
- Chlorostilbon poortmani (Bourcier, 1843)

= Short-tailed emerald =

Species of hummingbird

The short-tailed emerald (Chlorostilbon poortmani) is a species of hummingbird in the "emeralds", tribe Trochilini of subfamily Trochilinae. It is found in Colombia and Venezuela. It has also been called Poortman's emerald hummingbird.

== Taxonomy and systematics ==
Two subspecies of short-tailed emerald are recognized by the South American Classification Committee of the American Ornithological Society, the International Ornithological Committee (IOC), and the Clements taxonomy. They are the nominate C. p. poortmani and C. p. euchloris. However, BirdLife International's Handbook of the Birds of the World includes as a third subspecies what the other three taxonomic systems treat as a full species, the green-tailed emerald (C. alice). In addition, subspecies euchloris has been treated as a separate species by some authors.

The species' binomial name was given by Jules Bourcier (1797–1873), a French naturalist and expert on hummingbirds.

== Description ==
The male short-tailed emerald is 6.9 to 8.5 cm (2.7 to 3.3 in) long and females 6.5 to 7.5 cm (2.6 to 3.0 in). The species weighs between 3 and 4 g (0.11 and 0.14 oz). Both sexes of both subspecies have a straight black bill. Males of the nominate subspecies have an iridescent green forehead and bronzy green crown, upperparts, and uppertail coverts. Their underparts are brilliant glittery green. Their tail is short, forked, and iridescent bronze green. Nominate females have a dull green forehead and a dull bronzy green crown, upperparts, and uppertail coverts. Their underparts are gray. Their tail, like the male's, is short and forked. Its central pair of feathers is green and the others have dull turquoise bases becoming dark blue near the end with pale gray tips. Subspecies C. p. euchloris is very similar to the nominate, but is slightly larger and has a golden tinge to the crown and underparts.

The short-tailed emerald closely resembles several other members of genus Chlorostilbon. A few other species of the genus have similarly short tails (e.g. the green-tailed emerald). The female short-tailed is quite similar to those of the coppery emerald (C. russatus) and narrow-tailed emerald (C. stenurus) but they no blue in their tails.

== Distribution and habitat ==
The nominate subspecies of short-tailed emerald is found from the Andes of western Venezuela's Mérida and Táchira states through the eastern slope of Colombia's eastern Andes between Boyacá Department and Meta Department. C. p. euchloris is found in the eastern Andes of Colombia, on the western slope as far south as Huila Department and on the eastern slope in Santander Department. The species inhabits the interior and edges of humid forest, open woodland, and secondary forest. It also occurs in human-created habitats such as coffee and banana plantations and pastures with trees, though in the last it typically stays near streams. In elevation it is usually found between 750 and 2,200 m (2,500 and 7,200 ft) but has been recorded as low as 150 m (490 ft) in Mérida and as high as 2,800 m (9,200 ft) in Táchira.

== Behavior ==
=== Flight ===
The short-tailed emerald has a weaving and floating flight unlike that of other Chlorostilbon species.

=== Movement ===
The short-tailed emerald is generally sedentary, but the low and high elevations noted above are potentially evidence of vertical movements.

=== Feeding ===
The short-tailed emerald uses a variety of foraging strategies to feed on nectar. It uses trap-lining at low-quality sources and "steals" nectar from richer sources in other hummingbird's territories. Males sometimes defend nectar-rich feeding territories. The species forages fairly low in the vegetation, usually between 0.6 and 5 m (2 and 20 ft) above the ground, and usually in rather open areas such as roadsides, clearings, and coffee plantations. It seeks nectar at a variety of flowering plants, shrubs, and smaller trees and tends to shun large flowering trees. In addition to nectar, it also feeds on small insects captured by hawking from a perch.

=== Breeding ===
The short-tailed emerald apparently breeds in May and June on the Colombian eastern Andean slope but begins as early as February on the western slope. It makes a cup nest of soft material with leaf fragments, moss, Cycadaceae scales, and other materials on the outside and typically places it on thin branches about 1 m (3 ft) above the ground. The female incubates the clutch of two eggs for 14 to 16 days and fledging occurs 20 to 22 days after hatch.

=== Vocalization ===
What is thought to be the short-tailed emerald's song is "a long series of high-pitched tseep notes" that is thought to be sung only in the wet season. It also makes "repeated short tsip and longer downslurred plaintive tsew...tsew.." calls.

== In art ==
The English ornithologist John Gould depicts Poortman's emerald hummingbird in a lithograph dated 1860, from the neighborhood of Bogotá, Colombia, with a Victoria water lily against the background of a lake, a juxtaposition which has been called "one of the most striking examples of a plant chosen for its fame and beauty rather than its appropriateness".

== Status ==
The IUCN follows HBW taxonomy and so includes the green-tailed emerald in its assessment. It deems the short-tailed emerald sensu lato to be of Least Concern, though its population size and trend are not known. It does frequent human-maded habitats such as gardens and plantations as long as shrubs and trees are present.
