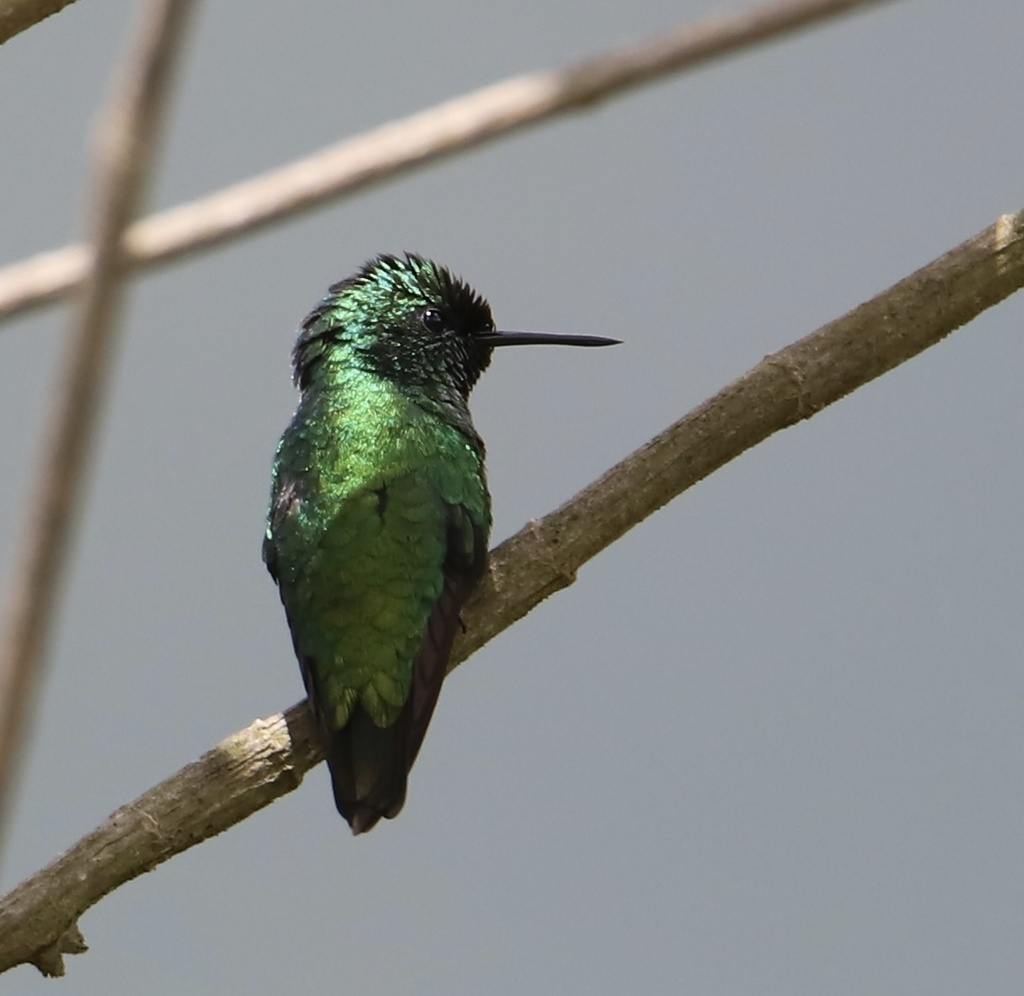
- CITES Appendix II

Scientific classification
- Kingdom: Animalia
- Phylum: Chordata
- Class: Aves
- Order: Apodiformes
- Family: Trochilidae
- Genus: Chlorostilbon
- Species: C. alice

Binomial name
- Chlorostilbon alice (Bourcier & Mulsant, 1848)

Synonyms
- Chlorostilbon poortmani alice

= Green-tailed emerald =

Species of hummingbird

The green-tailed emerald (Chlorostilbon alice) is a species of hummingbird in the "emeralds", tribe Trochilini of subfamily Trochilinae. It is endemic to Venezuela.

== Taxonomy and systematics ==
The green-tailed emerald was originally described as Trochilus alice and later moved to its present genus Chlorostilbon. The South American Classification Committee of the American Ornithological Society, the International Ornithological Committee (IOC), and the Clements taxonomy recognize it as a monotypic species. However, BirdLife International's Handbook of the Birds of the World treats it as a subspecies of the short-tailed emerald, (C. poortmani). At least one author has suggested that it is a subspecies of narrow-tailed emerald (C. stenurus).

== Description ==
The male green-tailed emerald is 7.5 to 8.5 cm (3.0 to 3.3 in) long and females 6.5 to 7.5 cm (2.6 to 3.0 in). The species weighs between 3 and 4 g (0.11 and 0.14 oz). Both sexes have a short, straight, black bill. The male's forehead and crown are shining dark green, its upperparts bronzy green, its tail glittering bronze-green, and its underparts grass green. The female's upperparts are like the male's. It has a white line behind the eye. Its underparts are pale grayish and the undertail coverts are dark gray. Its central tail feathers are green and the rest have green bases with black near the end and grayish tips. Immature birds resemble the female with buffy fringes on the feathers of the head.

== Distribution and habitat ==
The green-tailed emerald is endemic to northern Venezuela, from Falcón south to Lara and Sucre and east to Monagas. It inhabits the semi-open edges of a variety of forest types including semi-humid rainforest, cloudforest, secondary forest, plantations, and sometimes dry forest. In elevation it ranges between 700 and 1,800 m (2,300 and 5,900 ft).

== Behavior ==
=== Movement ===
The green-tailed emerald's movements are not well understood. It is not a long-distance migrant but makes irregular movements among locations and elevations.

=== Feeding ===
The green-tailed emerald uses a variety of foraging strategies to feed on nectar. It uses trap-lining at low-quality sources and "steals" nectar from richer sources in other hummingbird's territories. Males sometimes defend nectar-rich feeding territories. The species forages fairly low in the vegetation, usually between 1 and 6 m (3 and 20 ft) above the ground, and seeks nectar at a variety of flowering plants and shrubs. In addition to nectar, it also feeds on small insects captured by hawking from a perch.

=== Breeding ===
The green-tailed emerald's breeding season spans from January to March. It builds a cup nest of plant fibers, leaf bits, and bark lined with softer material and covered on the outside with leaf pieces and twigs. It typically places it as a saddle on a thin branch about 1 m (3 ft) above the ground. The female incubates the clutch of two eggs for about 14 days and fledging occurs 20 to 22 days after hatch.

=== Vocalization ===
The green-tailed emerald's song has apparently not been recorded or described, and there are few recordings of its call. It makes a "[t]high soft chittering while foraging".

== Status ==
The IUCN follows HBW taxonomy, and so has not assessed the green-tailed emerald separately from the more widespread short-tailed emerald. It has a restricted range and is considered locally common. It "[r]eadily accepts man-made habitats such as plantations, parks, gardens, and roadsides".
