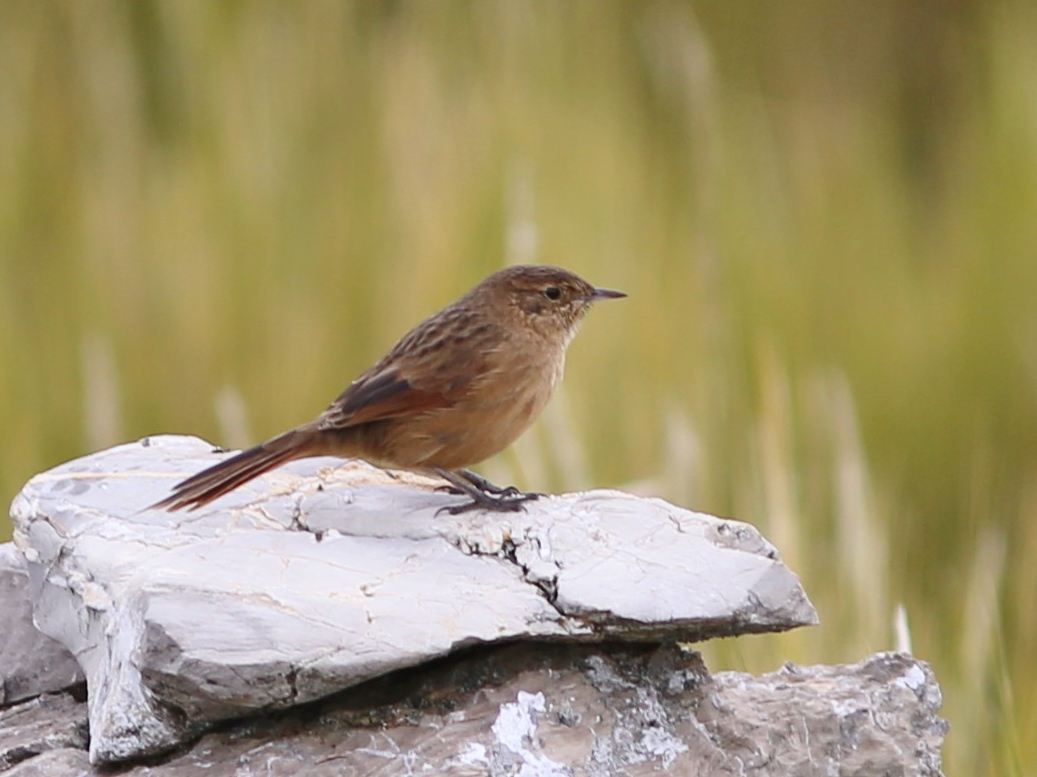

Conservation status
- Least Concern (IUCN 3.1)

Scientific classification
- Kingdom: Animalia
- Phylum: Chordata
- Class: Aves
- Order: Passeriformes
- Family: Furnariidae
- Genus: Asthenes
- Species: A. wyatti

Binomial name
- Asthenes wyatti (Sclater, PL & Salvin, 1871)

Subspecies
- See text
- Range of streak-backed canastero sensu stricto as defined by the Clements taxonomy, but excluding A. w. graminicola. (See the Taxonomy and Distribution sections.)

Synonyms
- Asthenes sclateri (in part)

Audio
- Song recorded in Ecuador

= Streak-backed canastero =

Species of bird

The streak-backed canastero (Asthenes wyatti) is a species of bird in the Furnariinae subfamily of the ovenbird family Furnariidae. It is found in Argentina, Bolivia, Colombia, Ecuador, Peru, and Venezuela.

== Taxonomy and systematics ==
The streak-backed canastero's taxonomy is unsettled. The International Ornithological Committee (IOC) and BirdLife International's Handbook of the Birds of the World (HBW) assign it these 12 subspecies:

- A. w. wyatti (Sclater, PL & Salvin, 1871)
- A. w. sanctaemartae (Todd, 1950)
- A. w. phelpsi (Chesser, 2016)
- A. w. mucuchiesi (Phelps & Gilliard, 1941)
- A. w. aequatorialis (Chapman, 1921)
- A. w. azuay (Chapman, 1923)
- A. w. graminicola (Sclater, PL, 1874)
- A. w. punensis (von Berlepsch & Stolzmann, 1901)
- A. w. cuchacanchae (Chapman, 1921)
- A. w. lilloi (Oustalet, 1904)
- A. w. sclateri (Cabanis, 1878)
- A. w. brunnescens (Nores & Yzurieta, 1983)

The South American Classification Committee of the American Ornithological Society (SACC) and the Clements taxonomy treat A. w. punensis, A. w. cuchacanchae, A. w. lilloi, and A. w. sclateri as the puna canastero, A. sclateri. They do treat the streak-backed canastero sensu stricto and puna canastero as a superspecies. They do not recognize A. w. brunnescens as a separate subspecies but include it in sclateri.

The IOC lumped the puna canastero into the streak-backed in July 2023; previously their taxonomy had treated them separately like the SACC and Clements still do, but with brunnescens recognized as a subspecies of the puna canestero. HBW had lumped the two by at least late 2018.

Subspecies A. w. phelpsi was previously named perijana but by the principle of priority that name belonged to a different taxon when another genus was merged into Asthenes.

== Description ==
The streak-backed canastero is 16 to 18 cm (6.3 to 7.1 in) long and weighs 17 to 25 g (0.60 to 0.88 oz). The sexes have the same plumage. Adults of the nominate subspecies A. w. wyatti have a narrow buff supercilium on an otherwise grizzled light brown and blackish face. Their crown, nape, back, rump, and uppertail coverts are olive-brown. Their forehead has dark brown flecks that become thin streaks on the crown and nape and wider streaks on the back. Their wings are dark fuscous with rufous edges on the coverts, tawny-rufous edges on the primaries, and rufous bases on the secondaries; the last form a wingband. Their central three pairs of tail feathers are dark fuscous brown with progressively more rufous on the outer webs The rest of their tail feathers are mostly rufous with some dark fuscous on the inner webs. Their chin is tawny-buff, their upper throat light orange-rufous and their lower throat pale brownish gray (both with thin dark brown streaks), their breast light brown with almost invisible dark brown flecks and spots, their belly bright tawny-buff, and their flanks and undertail coverts rufescent buff.

The other subspecies of the streak-backed canastero differ from the nominate and each other thus:

- A. w. sanctaemartae: wider but less contrasting streaks on the back, darker orange throat, dingy grayish buff underparts
- A. w. phelpsi: light brown underparts and dark chestnut-brown instead of rufous on outer tail feathers
- A. w. mucuchiesi: less brownish upperparts with grayer edges to the streaks
- A. w. aequatorialis: grayer or more rufous upperparts and blacker tail
- A. w. azuay: buffier underparts than aequatorialis; almost entirely rufous wings
- A. w. graminicola: tawny underparts with only a hint of streaks
- A. w. sclateri: pale gray-brown upperparts with rufous-edged blackish streaks, dark brown wing coverts with rufous-chestnut edges, base of flight feathers bright rufous and the rest brown with rufescent edges, central tail feathers dark gray-brown and the rest dark fuscous with progressively more rufous at the ends, whitish throat with faint pale rufous center, tawny-buff underparts
- A. w. punensis: darker and grayer upperparts with less streaking than sclateri and rufous only at the tail feather tips
- A. w. cuchacanchae: paler and more heavily streaked upperparts and paler and less tawny underparts than sclateri, and paler rufous on the flight feathers
- A. w. lilloi: slightly darker upperparts than cuchacanchae with a rufescent tinge and heavier streaks, rufous on flight feathers intermediate between cuchacanchae and sclateri
- A. w. brunnescens: essentially the same as sclateri

Subspecies A. w. graminicola and A. w. punensis intergrade in the area of Lake Titicaca on the Peru-Bolivia border.

== Distribution and habitat ==
The subspecies of the streak-backed canastero are found thus:

- A. w. wyatti: Norte de Santander Department in Colombia's Eastern Andes
- A. w. sanctaemartae: the isolated Sierra Nevada de Santa Marta in northern Colombia
- A. w. phelpsi: Serranía del Perijá straddling the Colombia-Venezuela border
- A. w. mucuchiesi: Mérida and Trujillo states in western Venezuela
- A. w. aequatorialis: western Andes of central Ecuador between Carchi and Cotopaxi provinces
- A. w. azuay: from Azuay Province in southern Ecuador south through Zamora-Chinchipe and northern Loja into northern Peru's Piura, Cajamarca, and Ancash departments
- A. w. graminicola: Andes of Peru from the Department of Junín south and east into western Bolivia's La Paz Department
- A. w. punensis: basin of Lake Titicaca in Bolivia's La Paz Department and Peru's Department of Puno
- A. w. cuchacanchae: from Bolivia's Cochabamba Department south through Potosí Department into northwestern Argentina's Salta Province
- A. w. lilloi: northwestern Argentina's Catamarca, Tucumán, and La Rioja provinces
- A. w. sclateri: Sierra de Córdoba in Córdoba Province in central Argentina
- A. w. brunnescens: Sierra de San Luis in central Argentina's San Luis Province

The streak-backed canastero inhabits páramo and puna grasslands, often arid ones, characterized by rock outcroppings and usually, but not always, with tall tussock grass and low shrubs. In the southern part of its range it also occurs locally in Polylepis woodlands with tussock grass ground cover. In elevation the northern (Venezuela to central Peru) populations mostly range from 3,000 to 4,500 m (9,800 to 14,800 ft) but occur locally as low as 2,400 m (7,900 ft) and up to 5,000 m (16,000 ft). The southern ("puna canastero") populations mostly occur between 2,000 to 4,000 m (6,600 to 13,100 ft) and range locally down to 1,800 m (5,900 ft).

== Behavior ==
=== General ===
The streak-backed canastero is usually seen singly or in pairs, and is essentially terrestrial, often staying hidden among clumps of grass. It runs rather than flies when disturbed.

=== Movement ===
The streak-backed canastero is mostly a year-round resident throughout its range but has been noted moving downslope in the southern Andes to avoid snowstorms.

=== Feeding ===
The streak-backed canastero's diet is arthropods, though details are lacking. It usually forages singly or in pairs, and mostly gleans prey from the ground and clumps of grass. It has been observed leaping into the air to catch insects on the wing.

=== Breeding ===
The streak-backed canastero's breeding season has not been fully described but appears to vary greatly among the subspecies. In the south it probably breeds in the austral spring and summer. The species weaves a globular nest of leaves, stems, and other plant material on the ground under a clump of grass or very near the ground in one. It has a side entrance with a tunnel leading to the nest chamber. The clutch size is two or three eggs. The incubation period, time to fledging, and details of parental care are not known.

=== Vocalization ===
Despite its very large north to south range, the streak-backed canastero's song and calls appear to differ little among the subspecies. Its song is a "dry rattling phrase that gradually ascends in frequency while accelerating and increasing in amplitude until the very end when it suddenly fades and drops in frequency ti-ti-tititittrrreeuw". The song is often repeated with a few seconds between bouts. Birds commonly sing from a perch atop a shrub and several birds may countersing. The species' calls include a "short shrill trrreee", a "very short chick!, a "long series of short high-pitched tink notes", and a "soft tzup or chup".

== Status ==
The IUCN has assessed the streak-backed canastero as being of Least Concern. It has an extremely large range, and though its population size is not known it is believed to be stable. No immediate threats have been identified. It is considered rare to locally or fairly common in various parts of its range and occurs in at least one protected area in each of Ecuador, Peru, and Venezuela.
