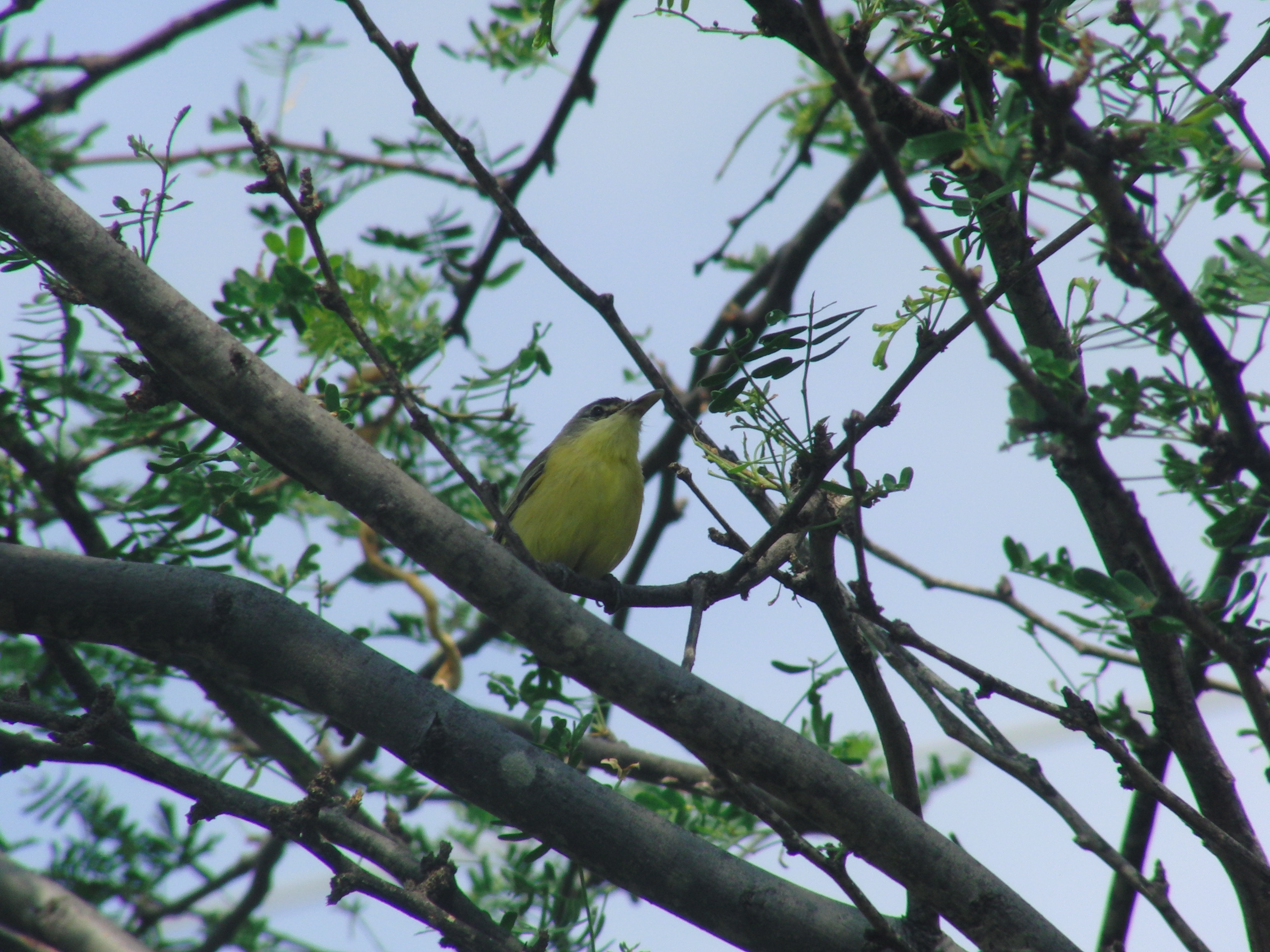

Conservation status
- Least Concern (IUCN 3.1)

Scientific classification
- Kingdom: Animalia
- Phylum: Chordata
- Class: Aves
- Order: Passeriformes
- Family: Tyrannidae
- Genus: Todirostrum
- Species: T. viridanum

Binomial name
- Todirostrum viridanum Hellmayr, 1927

= Maracaibo tody-flycatcher =

Species of bird

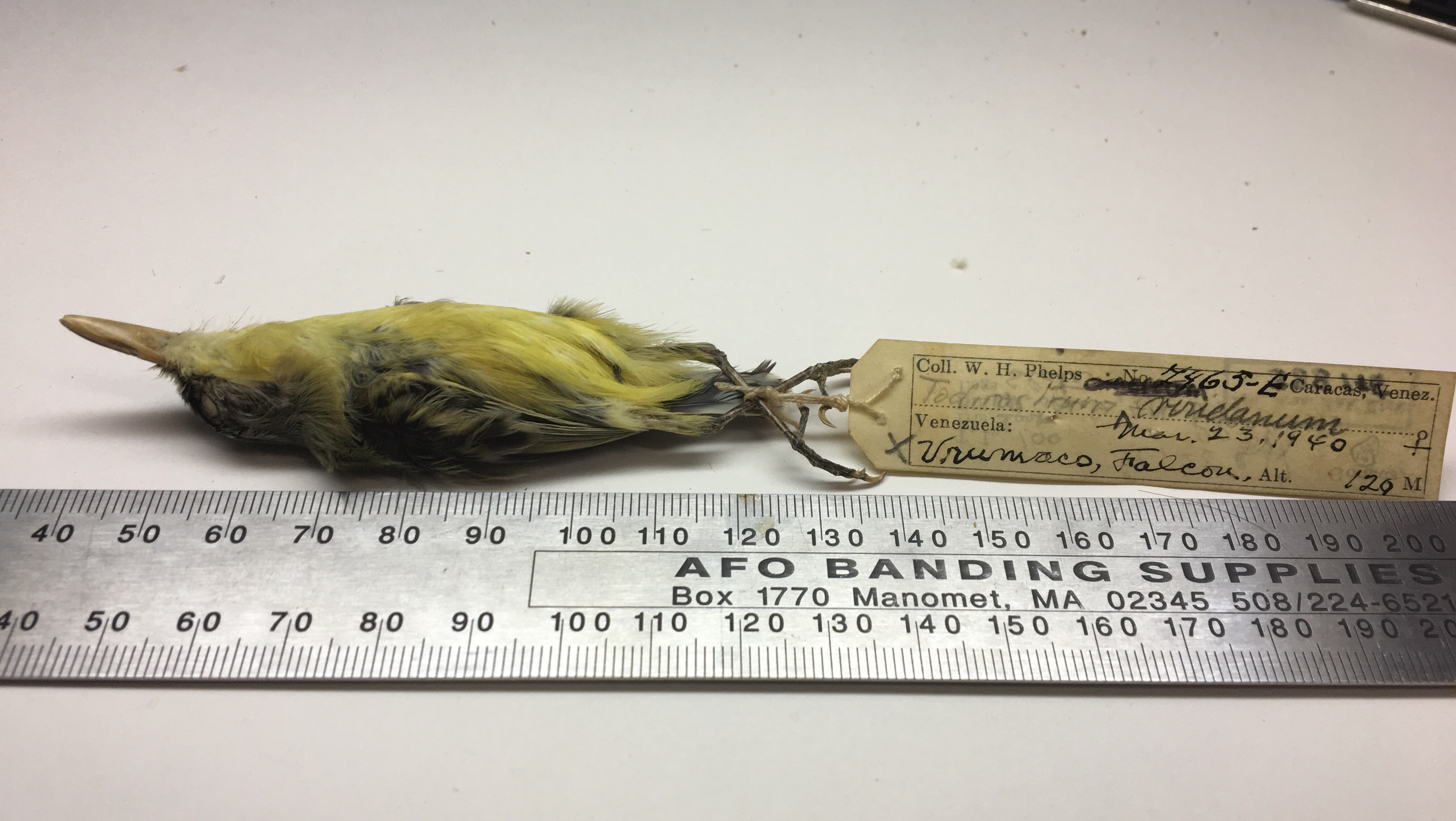
Maracaibo tody-flycatcher specimen from AMNH

The Maracaibo tody-flycatcher (Todirostrum viridanum), also known as the short-tailed tody-flycatcher, is a species of bird in the family Tyrannidae, the tyrant flycatchers. It is endemic to Venezuela.

== Taxonomy and systematics ==
The Maracaibo tody-flycatcher was formally described in 1927 as a full species with its current English name and binomial Todirostrum viridanum. For a time in the mid-twentieth century some authors treated it as a subspecies of the common tody-flycatcher (T. cinereum) but that placement did not receive widespread acceptance.

The Maracaibo tody-flycatcher is monotypic.

== Description ==
The Maracaibo tody-flycatcher is 9 to 10.2 cm (3.5 to 4.0 in) long. The sexes are alike. Adults have a black forecrown and a gray hindcrown and nape. Their lores and the area around their eyes are black. They have a mostly hidden yellowish white patch on the forehead and another above their lores. Their back, rump, and uppertail coverts are pale olive. Their wings are black with wide buff-yellow edges on the flight feathers and the edges and tips of the coverts; the last show as two wing bars. Their tail is quite short; it is black with white edges and tips of the feathers. Their underparts are mostly pale yellow with a buffy to ochraceous tinge on the flanks. They have a dark iris (though sometimes yellowish white), a black maxilla, a pinkish mandible, and gray legs and feet.

== Distribution and habitat ==
The Maracaibo tody-flycatcher is found only in coastal northwestern Venezuela. Its range extends from the mouth of Lake Maracaibo in Zulia east through northern Falcón to near Puerto Píritu in Anzoátegui. It includes the Paraguaná Peninsula off northern Falcón. There are also sight records further east than Puerto Píritu. The species primarily inhabits semi-arid and arid coastal scrublands and woodlands where it favors areas with Acacia, Cercidium, Cardon, and Opuntia vegetation. To a much lesser extent it is also found in tropical deciduous forest and gallery forest. In elevation it ranges from sea level to about 200 m (650 ft).

== Behavior ==
=== Movement ===
The Maracaibo tody-flycatcher is a year-round resident.

=== Feeding ===
The Maracaibo tody-flycatcher feeds on arthropods. It typically forages in pairs though sometimes singly, and rarely joins mixed-species feeding flocks. It mostly forages in dense vegetation near the ground but sometimes ascends higher in small trees. It primarily takes prey from foliage with short upward and outward sallies from a perch.

=== Breeding ===
The Maracaibo tody-flycatcher has breeding records between January and March and in May and June, suggesting that its season has two peaks. Nests under construction and with eggs were discovered in June and another was found under construction in November. Both members of a pair build the nest, a closed bag with a side entrance under a "roof". It is made from plant fibers bound with spider web and lined with soft plant material, and typically hangs from a branch within about 3.5 m (10 ft) of the ground. Often fibers hang messily from the nest's bottom. The clutches in seven nests were of two or three eggs. The incubation period, time to fledging, and details of parental care are not known.

=== Vocalization ===
The Maracaibo tody-flycatcher's song is a series of "ca. 6 sharp seek! notes".

== Status ==
The IUCN originally in 1988 assessed the Maracaibo tody-flycatcher as Threatened, then in 2004 as Near Threatened, and since October 2017 as being of Least Concern. It has a restricted range; its population size is not known and is believed to be decreasing. "Although expanses of suitable habitat remain within its limited range, substantial areas have been destroyed, principally around Lago de Maracaibo, as a result of burgeoning tourism, development pressures, overgrazing, firewood-gathering and pollution." It is considered fairly common and occurs in several protected areas.
