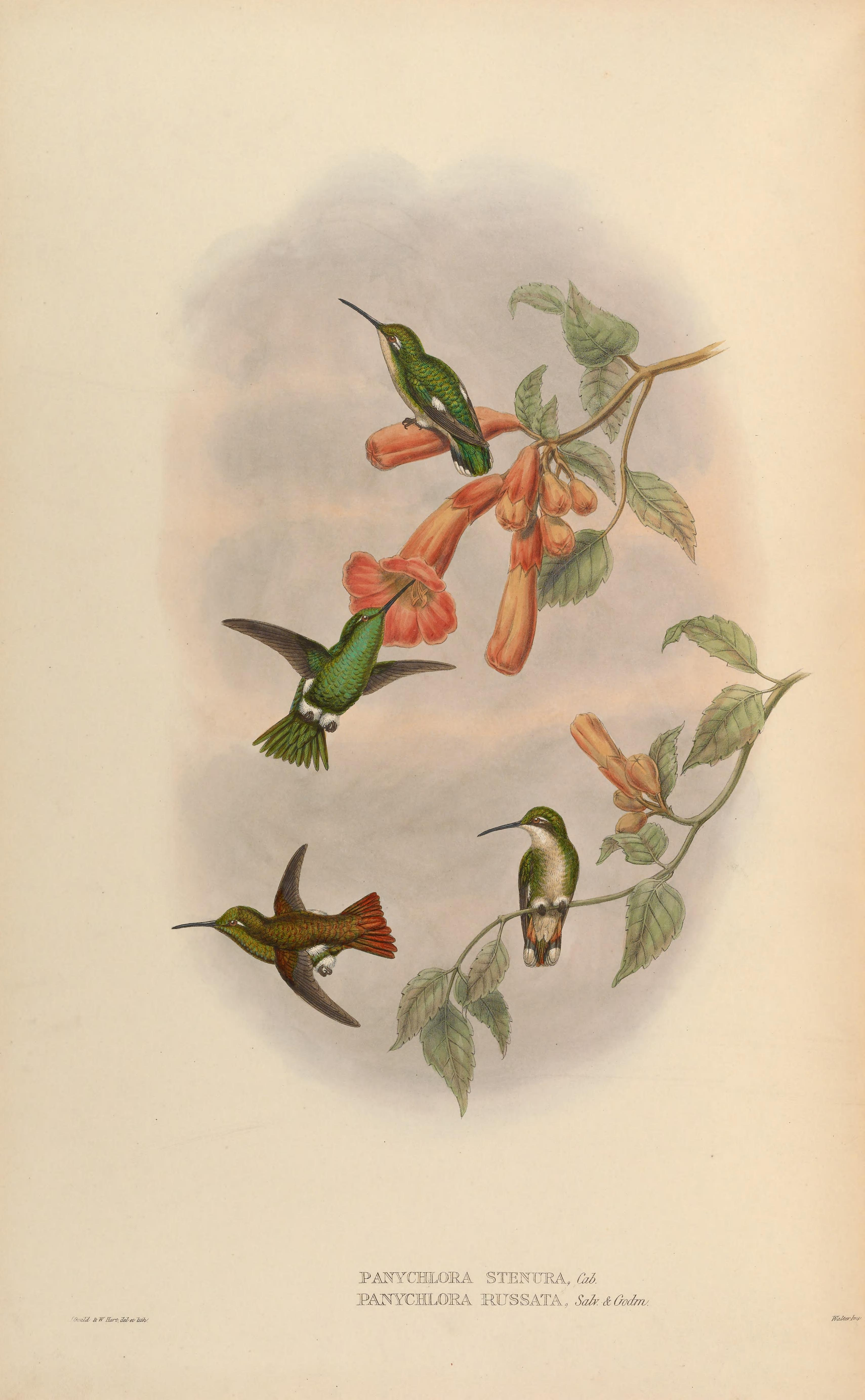
- Coppery emerald (bottom) with narrow-tailed emerald (top)

Conservation status
- Least Concern (IUCN 3.1)
- CITES Appendix II

Scientific classification
- Kingdom: Animalia
- Phylum: Chordata
- Class: Aves
- Order: Apodiformes
- Family: Trochilidae
- Genus: Chlorostilbon
- Species: C. stenurus

Binomial name
- Chlorostilbon stenurus (Cabanis & Heine, 1860)

= Narrow-tailed emerald =

Species of hummingbird

The narrow-tailed emerald (Chlorostilbon stenurus) is a species of hummingbird in the "emeralds", tribe Trochilini of subfamily Trochilinae. It is found in Colombia and Venezuela.

== Taxonomy and systematics ==
The narrow-tailed emerald has two subspecies, the nominate C. s. stenurus and C. s. ignotus. At least one author has suggested that the green-tailed emerald (C. alice) is either a third subspecies or is contained within ignotus.

== Description ==
The male narrow-tailed emerald is 8.5 to 9 cm (3.3 to 3.5 in) long and females 7.5 to 8 cm (3.0 to 3.1 in). The species weighs between 3.2 and 3.6 g (0.11 and 0.13 oz). Males of both subspecies have a short, straight, black bill. Males of the nominate subspecies have shining green forehead and crown, shining grass green upperparts including the uppertail coverts, and iridescent green underparts and flanks. Its tail is forked and dark green; the outer pair of feathers are very small and stiletto shaped. Females have a slightly decurved bill. Nominate females have a dull dark green crown with a bronze tinge and dark green upperparts and uppertail coverts. Their chin is brownish, the throat pale white, and the rest of the underparts a somewhat darker white. Their tail is forked. Its two innermost pairs of feathers are metallic bluish green. The next pair have metallic green bases becoming brown before the white tip. The outermost two pairs have gray bases becoming dark blue before the wide white tip. Males of subspecies C. s. ignotus are very similar to the nominate, but are smaller, more yellowish green above, and have a duller, darker green, tail.

== Distribution and habitat ==
The nominate subspecies of narrow-tailed emerald is found in the Andes of northwestern Venezuela from Trujillo state west into Colombia's Meta Department. C. s. ignotus is found from the coastal mountains of Venezuela south into Lara state. The species inhabits humid forest, scrublands, and secondary forest between elevations of 1,000 and 3,000 m (3,300 and 9,800 ft).

== Behavior ==
=== Movement ===
The narrow-tailed emerald is generally sedentary but locally makes seasonal elevational changes.

=== Feeding ===
The narrow-tailed emerald forages for nectar by trap-lining in fairly open areas, visiting a circuit of a variety of flowering plants such as Ericaceae, Rubiaceae, Heliconiaceae, Gesneriaceae, and Inga. It generally forages low, between 0.6 and 4 m (2 and 10 ft) above the ground. It captures small insects by hawking from a perch.

=== Breeding ===
The narrow-tailed emerald's breeding season spans from September to November. It builds a cup nest of moss with lichen on the outside and typically places it in a shrub or tree between 1 and 2 m (3 and 7 ft) above the ground. The female incubates the clutch of two eggs for 15 to 16 days and fledging occurs about 20 days after hatch.

=== Vocalization ===
As of mid-2022, neither the Cornell Lab of Ornithology's Macaulay Library nor xeno-canto have recordings of the narrow-tailed emerald's vocalizations.

== Status ==
The IUCN has assessed the narrow-tailed emerald as being of Least Concern, though it has a limited range and its population size and trend are unknown. No immediate threats have been identified. It is considered common throughout its range and is comfortable in human-made habitats.
