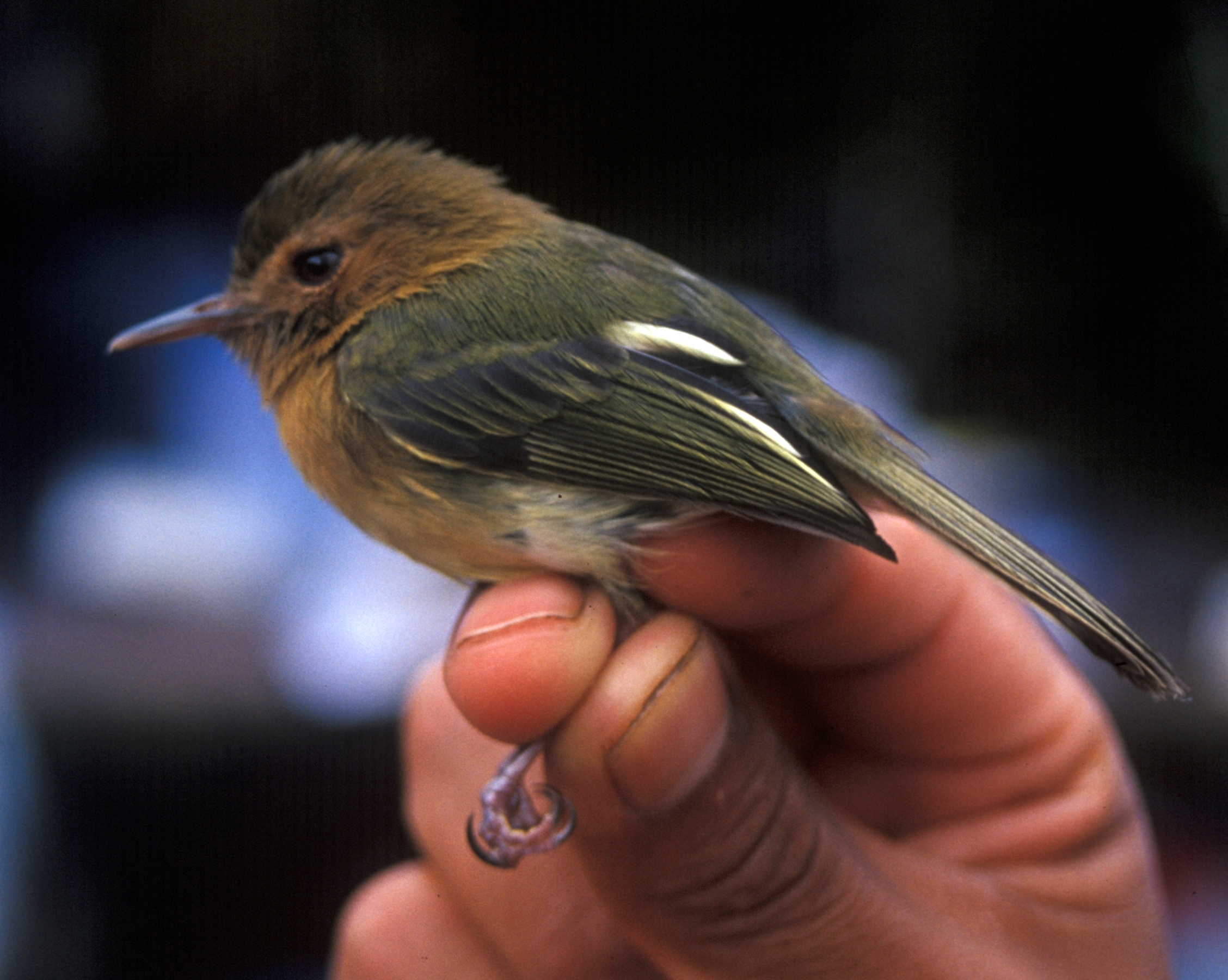

Conservation status
- Least Concern (IUCN 3.1)

Scientific classification
- Kingdom: Animalia
- Phylum: Chordata
- Class: Aves
- Order: Passeriformes
- Family: Tyrannidae
- Genus: Hemitriccus
- Species: H. cinnamomeipectus

Binomial name
- Hemitriccus cinnamomeipectus Fitzpatrick & O'Neill, 1979

= Cinnamon-breasted tody-tyrant =

Species of bird

The cinnamon-breasted tody-tyrant (Hemitriccus cinnamomeipectus) is a species of bird in the family Tyrannidae, the tyrant flycatchers. It is found in Ecuador and Peru.

== Taxonomy and systematics ==
The cinnamon-breasted tody-tyrant is monotypic. Its closest relatives appear to be the buff-breasted tody-tyrant (Hemitriccus mirandae) and Kaempfer's tody-tyrant (Hemitriccus kaempferi).

== Description ==
The buff-breasted tody-tyrant is about 10 cm (3.9 in) long; eight individuals weighed 6.5 to 8.5 g (0.23 to 0.30 oz). The sexes have the same plumage. Adults have a dark olive green crown and nape with a brownish wash. They have cinnamon lores, eye-ring, and ear coverts and a darkish gray cheek. Their back and rump are olive green. Their wings are dusky with olive yellow edges on all the flight feathers and much white on the secondaries. Their tail is dusky with olive yellow edges on the feathers. Their chin is cinnamon, their throat and breast rich warm buff, their belly sulphur yellow, and their flanks olive-tinged yellow. They have a pale medium brown to dark brown iris, a dark gray maxilla, a pale cream mandible, and pinkish gray legs and feet.

== Distribution and habitat ==
The cinnamon-breasted tody-tyrant's overall range spans only about 300 km (190 mi) north to south but it is not found continuously within it. The species is known only from two locations in southeastern Ecuador and three in Peru, all of them on the eastern slope of the Andes. It occurs in Ecuador's Morona-Santiago Province, on the Cordillera del Cóndor in both Ecuador and Peru, and in the Cordillera Colán and in Abra Patricia further south in Peru. The species primarily inhabits the understory of stunted humid montane forest on nutrient-poor soils. It occurs locally in taller forest. In elevation it ranges between 1,700 and 1,900 m (5,600 and 6,200 ft) in Ecuador and 1,700 and 2,200 m (5,600 and 7,200 ft) in Peru.

== Behavior ==
=== Movement ===
The cinnamon-breasted tody-tyrant is a year-round resident.

=== Feeding ===
The cinnamon-breasted tody-tyrant feeds on insects. It typically forages singly or in pairs and occasionally joins mixed-species feeding flocks. It mostly forages in the forest's understory up to about 2 m (7 ft) above the ground. It mostly takes prey using short upward sallies from a perch to grab it from the underside of leaves.

=== Breeding ===
The cinnamon-breasted tody-tyrant's breeding season appears to include June to August. Nothing else is known about the species' biology.

=== Vocalization ===
The cinnamon-breasted tody-tyrant's song is "a tinkling, descending, rapid trill: tEEEeeeerrrrr" and its call "a series of rising, mewed weeb notes".

== Status ==
The IUCN originally in 1988 assessed the cinnamon-breasted tody-tyrant as Near Threatened, in 2012 as Vulnerable, and since 2019 as being of Least Concern. It has a restricted range; its estimated population of between 20,000 and 50,000 mature individuals is believed to be stable. "The Cordillera de Colán is being deforested for cash crops, particularly marijuana and coffee. In the Cordillera del Cóndor in Ecuador, silica mining or gold mining are currently the main threats; some areas of the Cordillera del Cóndor in which the species previously occurred have been entirely denuded by gold mining." It is considered rare to uncommon in both Ecuador and Peru.
