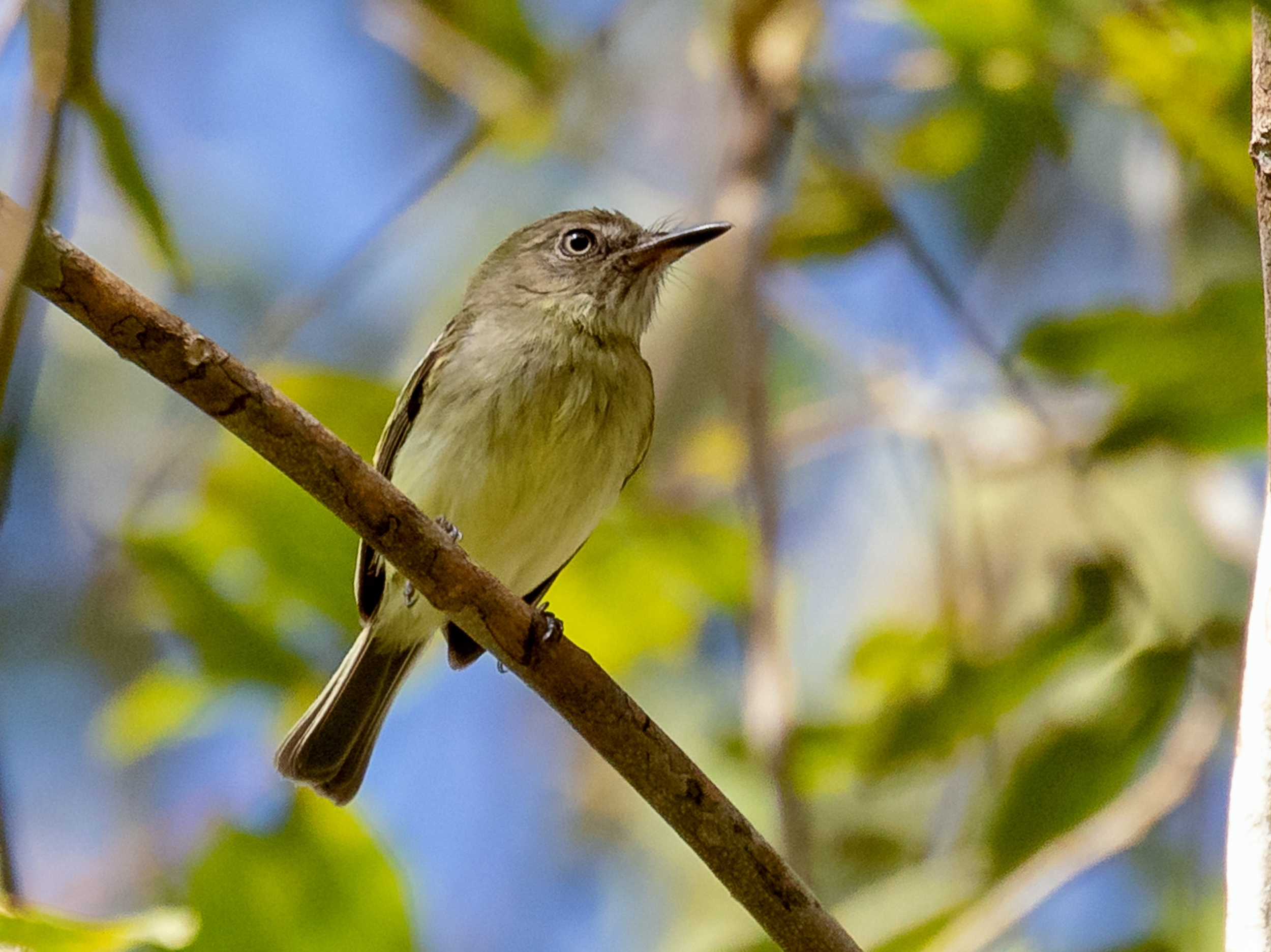

Conservation status
- Least Concern (IUCN 3.1)

Scientific classification
- Kingdom: Animalia
- Phylum: Chordata
- Class: Aves
- Order: Passeriformes
- Family: Tyrannidae
- Genus: Hemitriccus
- Species: H. minimus

Binomial name
- Hemitriccus minimus (Todd, 1925)

Synonyms
- Snethlagea minor minima; Hemitriccus minor minimus; Hemitriccus aenigma

= Zimmer's tody-tyrant =

Species of bird

Zimmer's tody-tyrant (Hemitriccus minimus) is a species of bird in the family Tyrannidae, the tyrant flycatchers. It is found in Bolivia, Brazil, Ecuador, and Peru.

== Taxonomy and systematics ==
Zimmer's tody-tyrant has a complicated taxonomic history. It was originally described in 1925 as Snethlagea minima. By the mid-twentieth century it had been reclassified as a subspecies of Snethlage's tody-tyrant (then Snethlagea minor). Snethlagea was later merged into Hemitriccus. Early specimens were eventually reexamined and determined to be the same as "H. aenigma", what was at the time of its description thought to be a new species. The previous H. m. minimus was recognized as a species, merged with H. aenigma, and by the principle of priority became the present H. minimus.

The species' English name commemorates American ornithologist John Todd Zimmer.

Zimmer's tody-tyrant is monotypic.

== Description ==
Zimmer's tody-tyrant is about 10 cm (3.9 in) long and weighs 6 to 8 g (0.21 to 0.28 oz). The sexes have the same plumage. Adults have a dark brown-olive crown with even darker dusky streaks. They have buffy lores, an indistinct buffy eye-ring, and brown ear coverts. Their back and rump are brownish olive. Their wings are dusky with yellow edges on the flight feathers that give a two-toned effect. The wing coverts have yellowish to yellowish green tips that show as two distinct wing bars. Their tail is brownish olive. Their throat is white with dusky streaks, their breast and sides are yellowish olive-buff with faint dusky streaks, and the center of their belly is pale yellow. They have a nearly white to pale straw iris, a black bill with a lighter base, and gray to pinkish gray legs and feet.

== Distribution and habitat ==
Zimmer's tody-tyrant has a disjunct distribution in the southern Amazon Basin. By far the largest area is in Brazil, roughly from northwestern Acre and Amazonas states east to Pará and south to Tocantins and Mato Grosso and into northeastern Bolivia. Isolated smaller areas are in the northeastern Peruvian departments of San Martín and Ucayali and in eastern Ecuador's Pastaza Province near the Peruvian border. In all areas its distribution is patchy but it is suspected to be present between the known sites. It inhabits stunted forest on sandy, nutrient-poor, soil in blackwater areas and to a lesser extent in terra firme forest along ridgetops. In elevation it reaches 450 m (1,500 ft) in Brazil.

== Behavior ==
=== Movement ===
Zimmer's tody-tyrant is a year-round resident.

=== Feeding ===
Zimmer's tody-tyrant feeds on insects. It typically forages in pairs, mostly between about 9 and 12 m (30 and 40 ft) above the ground in the crown of stunted forest and in vine tangles in the mid-level of taller forest. It takes most of its prey using short upward sallies from a perch to grab it from the underside of leaves.

=== Breeding ===
Nothing is known about the breeding biology of Zimmer's tody-tyrant.

=== Vocalization ===
The song of Zimmer's tody-tyrant is a "simple, high, rather sharp 'wtttti' trill (fast, upslurred 'w' colliding with the 1st 't')". The species' vocalizations are described as ventriloquial, making the bird hard to locate.

== Status ==
The IUCN originally in 1988 assessed Zimmer's tody-tyrant as Near Threatened but since 2004 as being of Least Concern. Though it has a very large range it is patchily distributed within it. "The species is sensitive to human disturbance and is suffering from widespread deforestation in Pará, Amazonas and particularly Mato Grosso, which has increased markedly since the 1960s due to road building, ranching, smallholder agriculture, mining and hydroelectric development." It is considered overall uncommon and very local but locally fairly common in Peru. It is found in several national parks and other protected areas.
