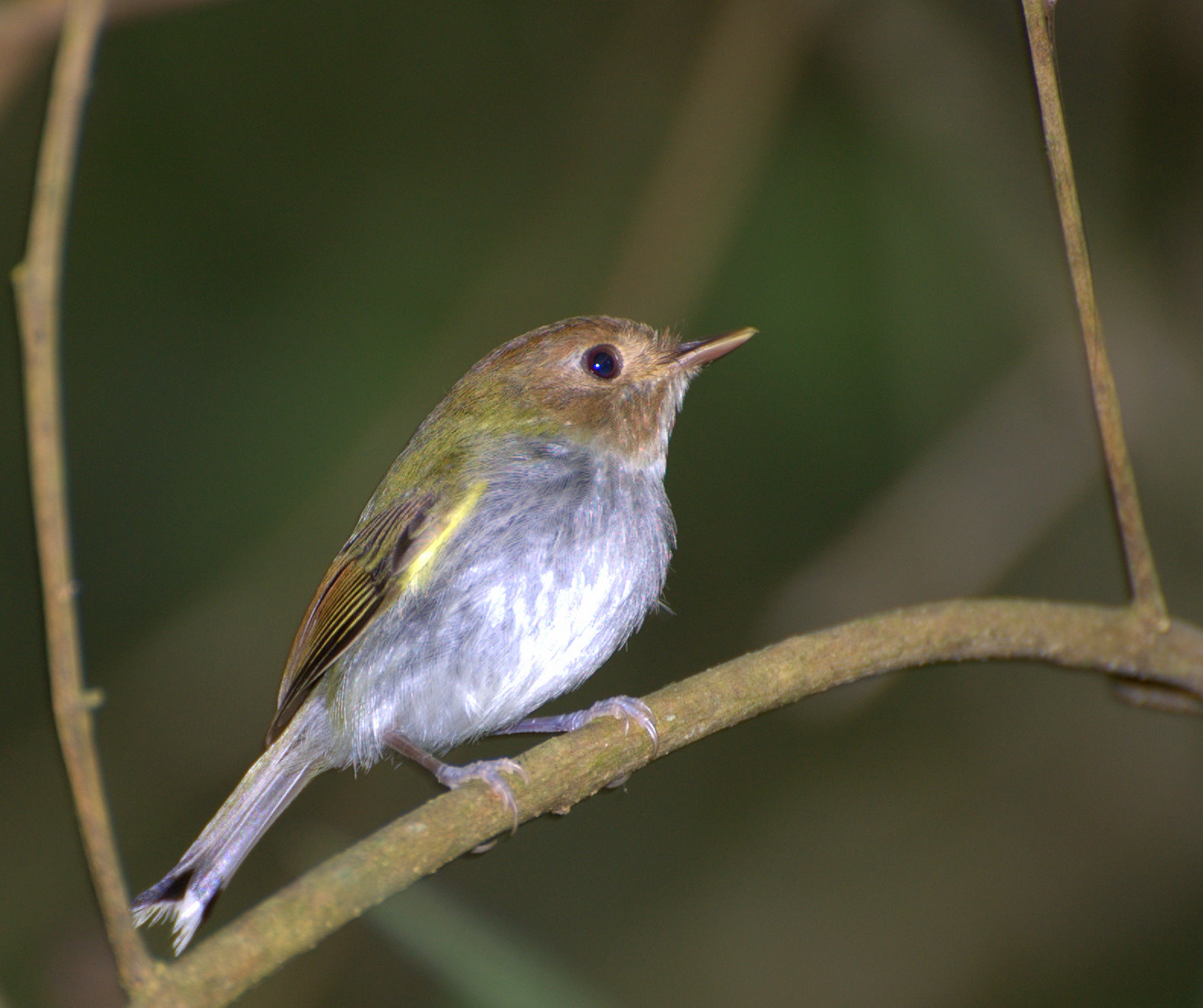

Conservation status
- Least Concern (IUCN 3.1)

Scientific classification
- Kingdom: Animalia
- Phylum: Chordata
- Class: Aves
- Order: Passeriformes
- Family: Tyrannidae
- Genus: Hemitriccus
- Species: H. furcatus

Binomial name
- Hemitriccus furcatus (Lafresnaye, 1846)

= Fork-tailed tody-tyrant =

Species of bird

The fork-tailed tody-tyrant or fork-tailed pygmy tyrant (Hemitriccus furcatus) is a species of bird in the family Tyrannidae, the tyrant flycatchers. It is endemic to Brazil.

== Taxonomy and systematics ==
The fork-tailed tody-tyrant was originally described in 1846 as Todirostrum furcatum. During part of the twentieth century some authors placed it by itself in genus Ceratotriccus, which by about 1980 was merged into Hemitriccus. Its closest relative appears to be Kaempfer's tody-tyrant (H. kaempferi).

The fork-tailed tody-tyrant is monotypic.

== Description ==
The fork-tailed tody-tyrant is about 11 cm (4.3 in) long. Adults have a distinctive tail whose outer feathers are longer than the inner ones and curve slightly inwards; males' tails are somewhat more deeply forked than females'. The sexes otherwise have the same plumage. They have a bright cinnamon-brown forehead and a brownish olive crown and nape. They have a pale cinnamon-buff spot above the lores and a pale cinnamon buff eye-ring on an otherwise cocoa-brown to cinnamon face. Their back and rump are bright olive. Their wings are bright olive with bright cinnamon edges on the inner flight feathers and wide creamy outer webs on the innermost secondaries. Their tail feathers are mostly olive with white tips and a black band before them. Their throat is cocoa-brown with a pure white band below it. Their breast and flanks are pale grayish with faint darker streaks. Their belly is more whitish than the breast. They have an orange-brown iris, a gray maxilla, a pinkish to yellowish mandible, and gray to pinkish legs and feet.

== Distribution and habitat ==
The fork-tailed tody-tyrant has a disjunct distribution in east-central and southeastern Brazil. It is found in a small area of eastern Bahia and in a larger one encompassing extreme southern Minas Gerais, Rio de Janeiro, and eastern São Paulo states (Serra do Mar coastal forests). The fork-tailed tody-tyrant is a bird of the Atlantic Forest. It inhabits the edges of humid primary and secondary forest, where it favors thickets of bamboo and vine tangles. In elevation it ranges from sea level to 1,200 m (3,900 ft).

== Behavior ==
=== Movement ===
The fork-tailed tody-tyrant is a year-round resident.

=== Feeding ===
The fork-tailed tody-tyrant feeds on insects, though details are lacking. It typically forages singly and sometimes in pairs, and rarely joins mixed-species feeding flocks. It mostly forages in the undergrowth, taking prey using short upward sallies from a perch to grab it from the underside of leaves.

=== Breeding ===
The fork-tailed tody-tyrant's breeding season has not been defined but appears to include November in Bahia. Nothing else is known about the species' breeding biology.

=== Vocalization ===
The fork-tailed tody-tyrant's song is a "short, dry, hurried, temperamental-sounding rattle, like 't-drrrit' ('t' lower)".

== Status ==
The IUCN originally in 1988 assessed the fork-tailed tody-tyrant as Threatened, then in 1994 as Vulnerable, in 2000 as Endangered, the Vulnerable again in 2004. In 2025, the species was downlisted to least concern. It has a small and highly fragmented range and its estimated population of between 2500 and 10,000 mature individuals is believed to be decreasing. "Although some deforestation may lead to a short-term increase in areas with bamboo, forest clearance has been so extensive throughout its range that it is likely to have greatly reduced numbers. Smallholder farms are rapidly encroaching on the remaining forest at Boa Nova, Bahia." It is considered uncommon overall. It occurs in a few protected areas though some of them are still threatened with deforestation.
