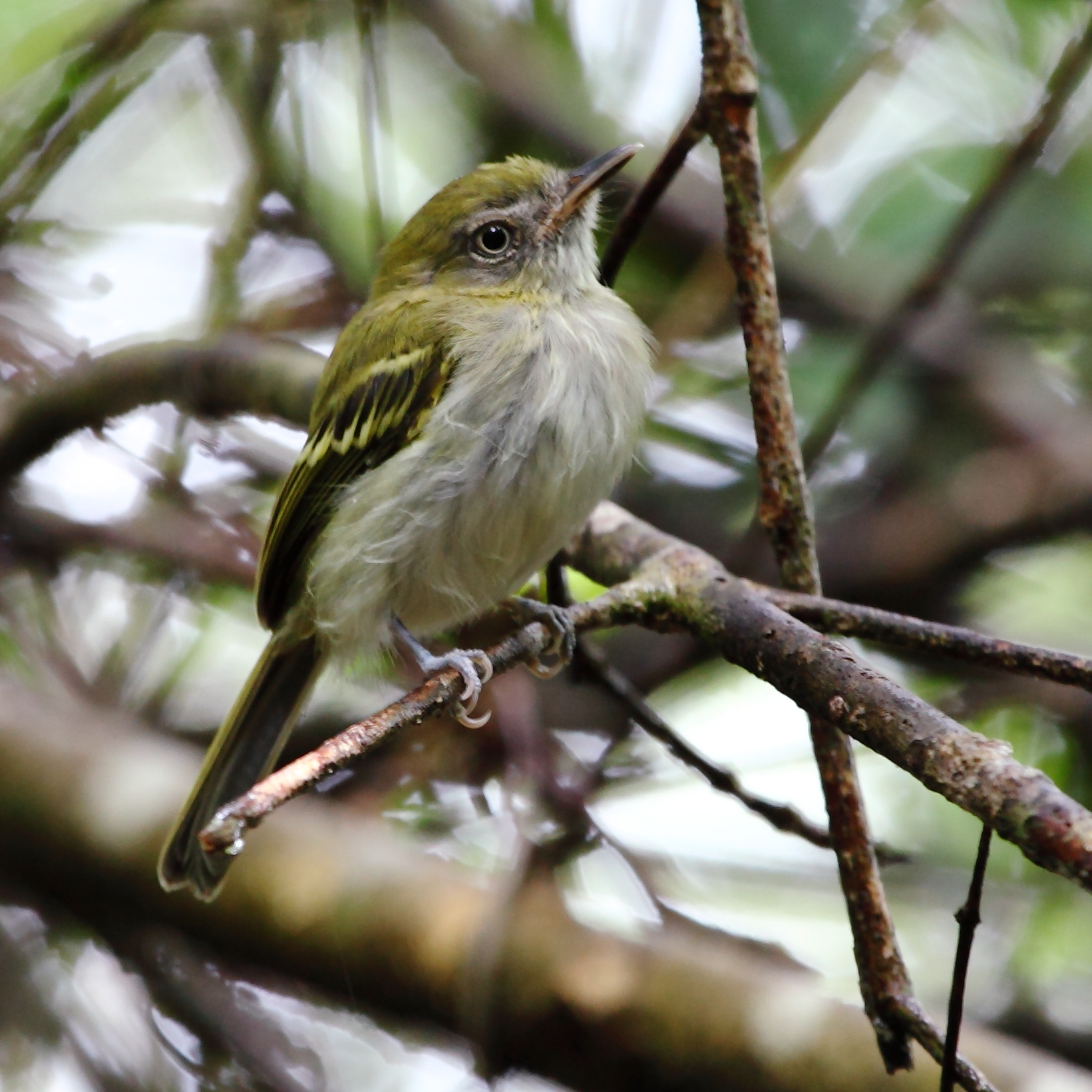
- at Baia Formosa, Rio Grande do Norte state, Brazil.

Conservation status
- Least Concern (IUCN 3.1)

Scientific classification
- Kingdom: Animalia
- Phylum: Chordata
- Class: Aves
- Order: Passeriformes
- Family: Tyrannidae
- Genus: Hemitriccus
- Species: H. griseipectus

Binomial name
- Hemitriccus griseipectus (Snethlage, 1907)

= White-bellied tody-tyrant =

Species of bird

The white-bellied tody-tyrant (Hemitriccus griseipectus) is a species of bird in the family Tyrannidae, the tyrant flycatchers. It is found in Bolivia, Brazil, and Peru.

== Taxonomy and systematics ==
The white-bellied tody-tyrant has two subspecies, the nominate H. g. griseipectus (Snethlage, 1907) and H. g. naumburgae (Zimmer, JT, 1945).

The species had a complicated taxonomic history from its original description to late in the twentieth century. It was described as Euscarthmus griseipectus. It was later moved to genus Idioptilon, and later still both Euscarthmus and Idioptilon were merged into Hemitriccus. What is now the white-eyed tody-tyrant (H. zosterops) was for a time treated as conspecific with the white-bellied. A few authors have treated naumburgae as a subspecies of the white-eyed tody-tyrant but that assignment has not been widely accepted.

== Description ==
The white-bellied tody-tyrant is 9.5 to 11 cm (3.7 to 4.3 in) long and weighs 8 to 10 g (0.28 to 0.35 oz). The sexes and the subspecies have essentially the same plumage. Adults have an olive-green crown and nape. They have gray lores, an indistinct white eye-ring, and light gray ear coverts. Their back and rump are olive-green. Their wings are dusky with pale yellow edges on the flight feathers and pale yellow tips on the coverts; the latter show as two distinct wing bars. Their tail is olive-green. Their throat is whitish with faint gray streaks, their breast is very light gray with some white streaking and a yellow tinge on its sides, their belly is whitish, and their flanks and undertail coverts are pale yellow. Both subspecies have a nearly white to pale straw or light yellowish gray iris, a black bill with sometimes a pinkish base to the mandible, and light grayish legs and feet.

== Distribution and habitat ==
The white-bellied tody-tyrant has a disjunct distribution. The nominate subspecies has by far the larger range throughout the central Amazon Basin south of the Amazon. In Peru it is found well east of the Andes from southern Loreto Department south to Cuzco and Puno departments, though only very locally in the northern and central parts of that range. It is found from Peru into northern Bolivia and across Brazil east to the Tocantins River. Subspecies H. g. naumburgae is found in a small area of northeastern Brazil between the states of Rio Grande do Norte and Alagoas.

The white-bellied tody-tyrant's nominate subspecies inhabits a variety of humid forest types both primary and secondary. These include terra firme, the transition forest between terra firme and igapó, cloudforest, and campinarana. Subspecies H. g. naumburgae inhabits gallery forest and dense humid forest. In both areas it occurs mostly in the forest's lower and mid-levels and sometimes to the subcanopy.

== Behavior ==
=== Movement ===
The white-bellied tody-tyrant is a year-round resident.

=== Feeding ===
The white-bellied tody-tyrant feeds on arthropods and fruits. It typically forages singly or in pairs, and occasionally joins mixed-species feeding flocks. It feeds mostly in the forest's lower to middle levels. Subspecies H. g. naumburgae takes about half of its prey in mid-air with sallies from a perch. The nominate subspecies takes most of its food using short upward sallies from a perch to grab prey from the underside of leaves; naumburgae also hunts this way.

=== Breeding ===
The nominate subspecies of the white-bellied tody-tyrant apparently breeds between August and October; H. g. naumburgae appears to breed between January and April. Only one nest of H. g. naumburgae is known, and none of the nominate subspecies. It was a hanging bag with a side entrance, made from grass, palm leaves, and fungal filaments. Nothing else is known about the species' breeding biology.

=== Vocalization ===
The white-bellied tody-tyrant makes a variety of tik vocalizations, sometimes singly and sometimes combined as in tu-rik or in a sequence. A description of its song is "a simple chiming pair or trio of notes, the first lower: ta-TEEK or ta-TI'PIP".

== Status ==
The IUCN has assessed the white-bellied tody-tyrant as being of Least Concern. It has a very large range; its population size is not known and is believed to be decreasing. No immediate threats have been identified. Both subspecies occur in protected areas. However, the habitat of H. g. naumburgae "is severely fragmented due to the isolation of the forest remnants and the species' low mobility outside the forest matrix".
