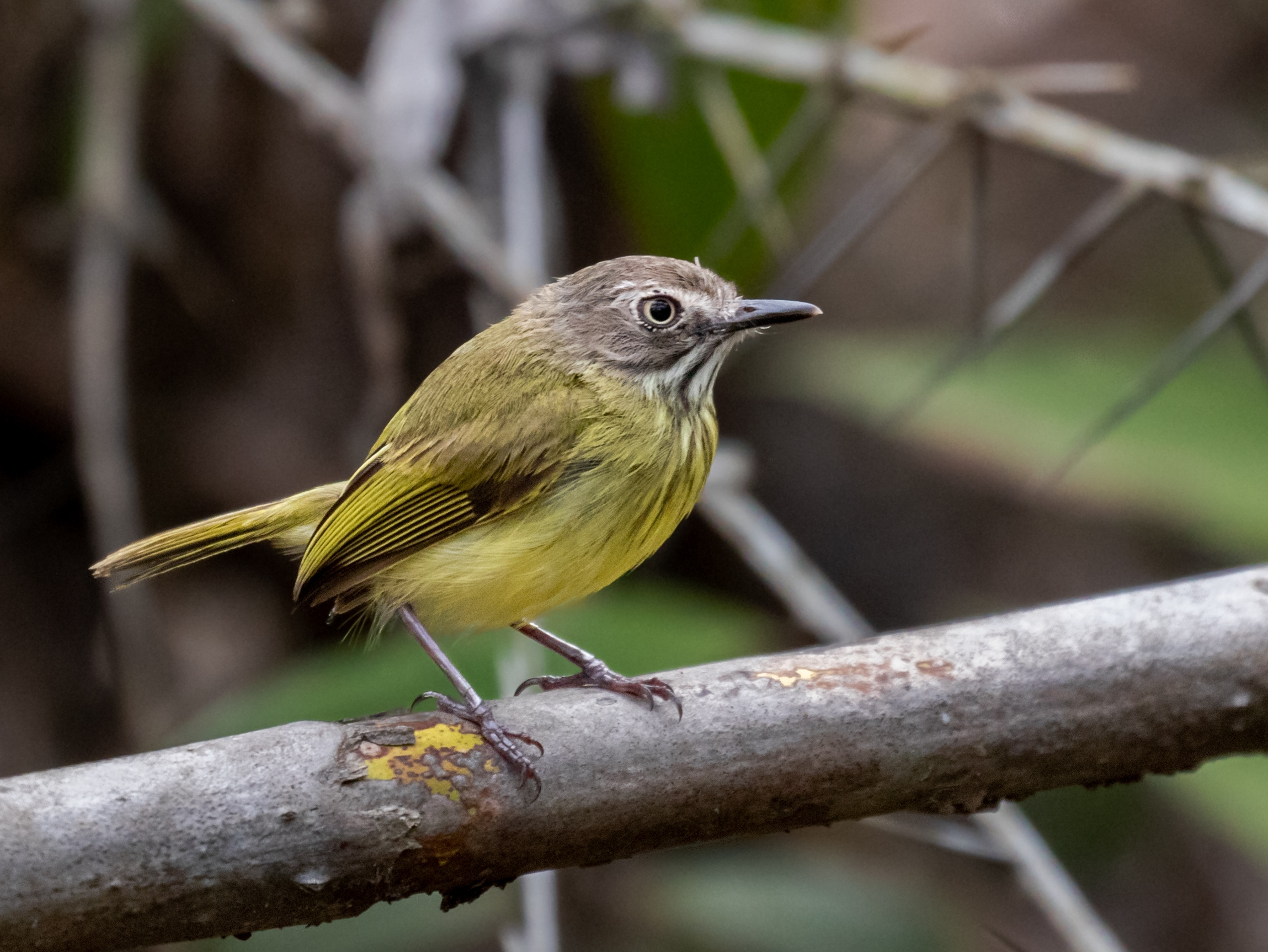

Conservation status
- Least Concern (IUCN 3.1)

Scientific classification
- Kingdom: Animalia
- Phylum: Chordata
- Class: Aves
- Order: Passeriformes
- Family: Tyrannidae
- Genus: Hemitriccus
- Species: H. striaticollis

Binomial name
- Hemitriccus striaticollis (Lafresnaye, 1853)

= Stripe-necked tody-tyrant =

Species of bird

The stripe-necked tody-tyrant (Hemitriccus striaticollis) is a species of bird in the family Tyrannidae, the tyrant flycatchers. It is found in Bolivia, Brazil, Colombia and Peru.

== Taxonomy and systematics ==
The stripe-necked tody-tyrant has a complicated taxonomic history. It was originally described in 1853 as Todirostrum striaticolle. During different parts of the twentieth century it was placed in genera Euscarthmornis and Idioptilon, both of which were eventually merged into Hemitriccus. Also during parts of the twentieth century what are now Johannes's tody-tyrant (H. iohannis) and the white-eyed tody-tyrant (H. zosterops) were treated as subspecies of the stripe-necked tody-tyrant.

The stripe-necked tody-tyrant has two subspecies, the nominate H. s. striaticollis (Lafresnaye, 1853) and H. s. griseiceps (Todd, 1925). Some authors doubt the validity of the latter.

== Description ==
The stripe-necked tody-tyrant is 11 to 12 cm (4.3 to 4.7 in) long and weighs 7.8 to 11 g (0.28 to 0.39 oz). The sexes have the same plumage. Adults of the nominate subspecies have a grayish brown crown. They have a large white spot above the lores, a white eye-ring, and grayish brown ear coverts. Their back and rump are olive. Their wings are olive with indistinct yellow edges on the flight feathers. Their tail is olive. Their throat is white with distinct brownish streaks that continue onto the bright yellow breast. The rest of their underparts are mostly unstreaked bright yellow with a greenish tinge and diffuse darker streaks on the flanks. Subspecies H. s. griseiceps has a gray crown and duller green upperparts than the nominate. Both subspecies have a whitish to pale yellow iris, a blackish bill with a paler base to the mandible, and light gray legs and feet.

== Distribution and habitat ==
The stripe-necked tody-tyrant has a disjunct distribution. The nominate subspecies has by far the larger range. Its main population is found in central and southern Amazonian Brazil south of the Amazon from the Madeira River east to Maranhão and south to Mato Grosso, Goiás, and Minas Gerais states. That range continues west through northern Bolivia slightly into southeastern Peru's Madre de Dios Department. Small separate populations are also found in Peru's San Martín and Cuzco departments, in Colombia along the border between Meta and Guaviare departments, and in far eastern Brazil's Bahia state. Subspecies H. s. griseiceps has a very limited range along the lower Tapajos River in Brazil's western Pará state.

The Amazonian population of the stripe-necked tody-tyrant primarily inhabits somewhat open landscapes including semi-humid to humid secondary woodland and thickets and bamboo along watercourses. In Colombia and parts of Peru it occurs in the undergrowth of wooded savanna. In elevation it ranges between sea level and 700 m (2,300 ft) in Brazil, up to 400 m (1,300 ft) in Colombia, and in Peru to 1,000 m (3,300 ft) in San Martín Department, 500 m (1,600 ft) in Cuzco, and only 300 m (1,000 ft) in Madre de Dios.

== Behavior ==
=== Movement ===
The stripe-necked tody-tyrant is a year-round resident.

=== Feeding ===
The stripe-necked tody-tyrant feeds on arthropods. It typically forages singly or in pairs and very seldom joins mixed-species feeding flocks. It mostly forages in the mid- to upper levels of low-stature forest and in shrubby edges, vine tangles, and bamboo. It takes most of its prey using short upward sallies from a perch to grab it from the underside of leaves.

=== Breeding ===
The one known nest of the stripe-necked tody-tyrant was found in November in Brazil. It was a bag made mostly from grass, other plant fibers, and moss with a few dead leaves and bark pieces included. It hung from a branch of a small tree about 1 m (3 ft) above the ground and contained two eggs. Nothing else is known about the species' breeding biology.

=== Vocalization ===
In Brazil the stripe-necked tody-tyrant's song is a "very high, fast, liquid, yet sharp 'Didrdr', 'Wic', or sweeping 'Wheet' ". What appears to be different song in Peru is "a loud, ringing, phrase...PEE-ti-ti-ti".

== Status ==
The IUCN has assessed the stripe-necked tody-tyrant as being of Least Concern. It has a very large range; its population size is not known and is believed to be decreasing. No immediate threats have been identified. It is overall considered uncommon to locally fairly common, though "rare and very local" in Colombia. It occurs in several protected areas within its main range.
