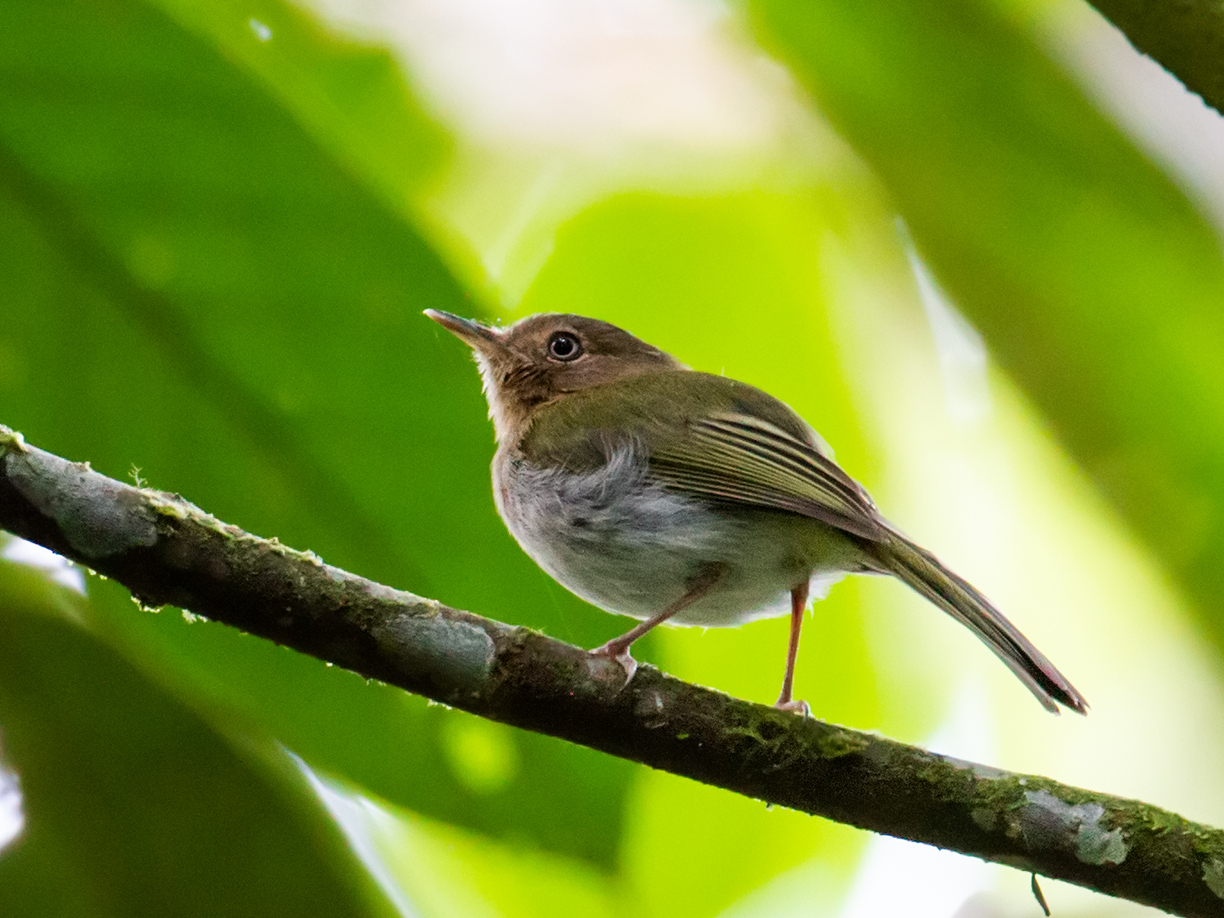

Conservation status
- Least Concern (IUCN 3.1)

Scientific classification
- Kingdom: Animalia
- Phylum: Chordata
- Class: Aves
- Order: Passeriformes
- Family: Tyrannidae
- Genus: Hemitriccus
- Species: H. rufigularis

Binomial name
- Hemitriccus rufigularis (Cabanis, 1873)

= Buff-throated tody-tyrant =

Species of bird

The buff-throated tody-tyrant (Hemitriccus rufigularis) is a species of bird in the family Tyrannidae, the tyrant flycatchers. It is found in Bolivia, Colombia, Ecuador, and Peru.

== Taxonomy and systematics ==
The buff-throated tody-tyrant has a complicated taxonomic history. It was originally described in 1873 as Euscarthmus rufigularis. In the twentieth century it was moved to genus Idioptilon which was later merged into Hemitriccus.

The buff-throated tody-tyrant is monotypic.

== Description ==
The buff-throated tody-tyrant is about 12 cm (4.7 in) long and weighs 7.8 to 9.8 g (0.28 to 0.35 oz). The sexes have the same plumage. Adults have a grayish buff crown and nape. They have an indistinct buffy white eye-ring on and otherwise cinnamon buff face. Their back and rump are olive green. Their wings and tail are olive green with greenish yellow edges on the flight feathers and tail feathers. Their throat and breast are pale cinnamon buff with faint gray streaks, their belly is whitish with a yellow tinge and gray mottling on the flanks, and their undertail coverts are pale yellow. They have a highly variable pale iris, a black maxilla with a whitish tip, a grayish or cream mandible, and pale gray or cream legs and feet.

== Distribution and habitat ==
Most sources place the buff-throated tody-tyrant in Bolivia, Ecuador, and Peru. Those that provide detail place it along the eastern side of the Andes from northern Ecuador south through Peru into Bolivia as far as western Santa Cruz Department. It occurs mostly on outlying ridges in the foothills rather than on the main slope. However, the South American Classification Committee of the American Ornithological Society and BirdLife International include Colombia in its range. The latter's map shows it straddling the Colombia-Ecuador border.

The buff-throated tody-tyrant inhabits humid montane forest in the subtropical zone, generally in forest whose canopy is 20 to 30 m (65 to 100 ft) high and much less often in lower, stunted, 10 to 12 m (35 to 40 ft) forest on ridgetops. In elevation it ranges between 1,300 and 1,500 m (4,300 and 4,900 ft) in Ecuador, 750 and 1,450 m (2,500 and 4,800 ft) in Peru, and 800 and 1,700 m (2,600 and 5,600 ft) in Bolivia.

== Behavior ==
=== Movement ===
The buff-throated tody-tyrant is a year-round resident.

=== Feeding ===
The buff-throated tody-tyrant feeds on insects, though details are lacking. It typically forages singly or in pairs and seldom joins mixed-species feeding flocks. It mostly forages in the forest's middle level between about 2 and 8 m (5 and 25 ft) above the ground. It mostly takes prey using short upward sallies from a perch to grab it from the underside of leaves.

=== Breeding ===
One buff-throated tody-tyrant nest is known. It was a ball woven from grass and small twigs with a side entrance, suspended from a twig 1 m (3 ft) above the ground. The clutch is two eggs. Nothing else is known about the species' breeding biology.

=== Vocalization ===
The buff-throated tody-tyrant's song is "a slow series of 1–5 rising, mewed, nasal dweep or dwip notes" and its call "a more rapid, rising series of notes: dew-dew-dew-DEWP-DEWP?".

== Status ==
The IUCN originally in 1988 assessed the buff-throated tody-tyrant as Near Threatened but since March 2023 as being of Least Concern. It has a large range; its estimated population of between 120,000 and 140,000 mature individuals is believed to be decreasing. "The species is sensitive to habitat loss. Forest destruction is most prevalent in the foothills, mainly as a consequence of conversion for agriculture and logging, amplified by ongoing human encroachment." It is considered "scarce and local" in Ecuador and "uncommon to fairly common" in Peru.
