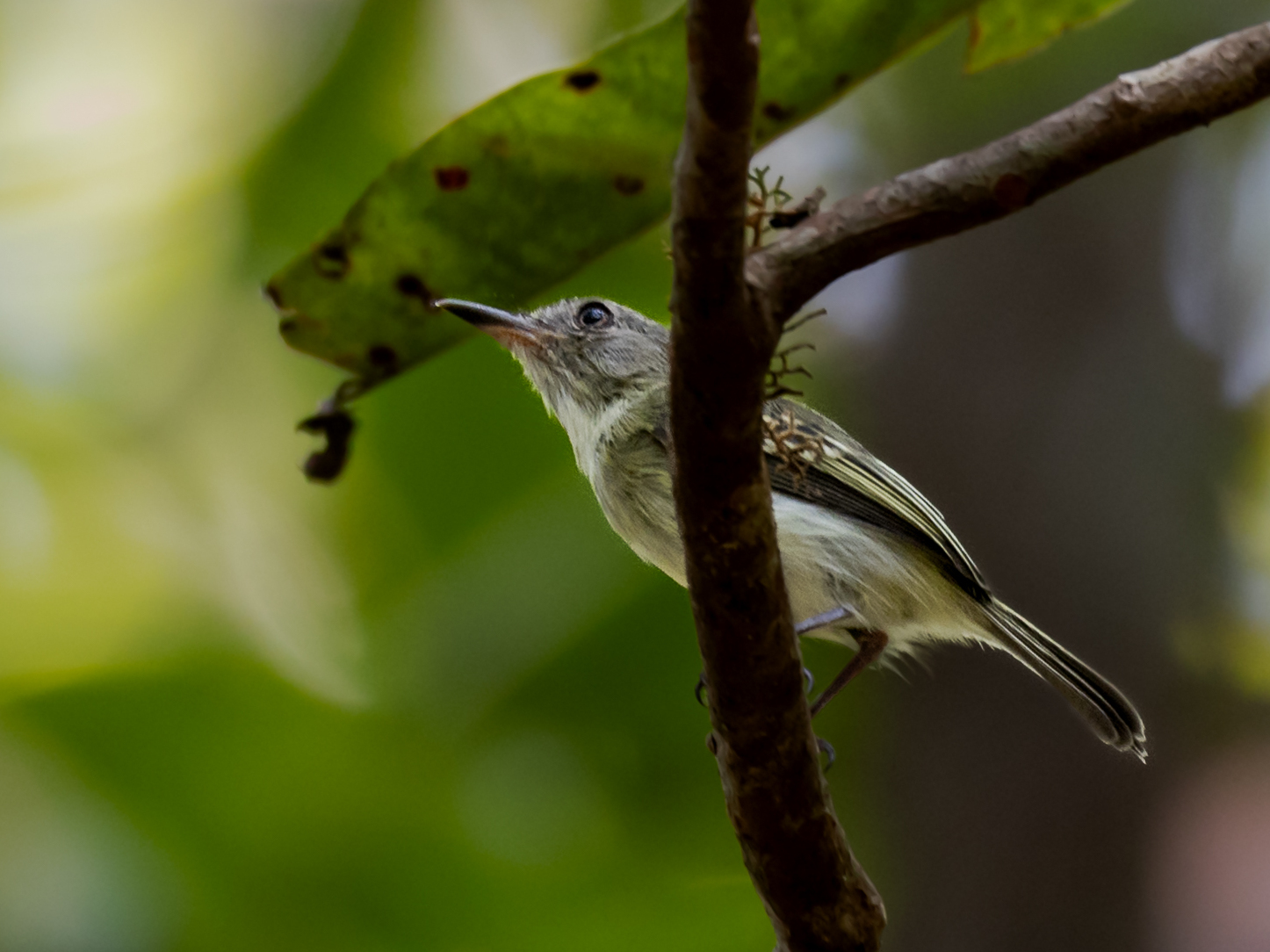

Conservation status
- Least Concern (IUCN 3.1)

Scientific classification
- Kingdom: Animalia
- Phylum: Chordata
- Class: Aves
- Order: Passeriformes
- Family: Tyrannidae
- Genus: Hemitriccus
- Species: H. inornatus

Binomial name
- Hemitriccus inornatus (Pelzeln, 1868)

= Pelzeln's tody-tyrant =

Species of bird

Pelzeln's tody-tyrant (Hemitriccus inornatus) is a species of bird in the family Tyrannidae, the tyrant flycatchers. It is found in Brazil, Suriname, and Venezuela.

== Taxonomy and systematics ==
Pelzeln's tody-tyrant had a complicated taxonomic history from its original description in 1868 to late in the twentieth century. It was described as Euscarthmus inornatus. It was later moved to the genus Idioptilon, and later still both Euscarthmus and Idioptilon were merged into Hemitriccus. It was for a time treated as a subspecies of the pearly-vented tody-tyrant (H. margaritaceiventer).

The type specimen of Pelzeln's tody-tyrant had been collected almost 40 years before Pelzeln formally described it in 1868. The species was not seen again until 1992.

Pelzeln's tody-tyrant is monotypic.

== Description ==
Pelzeln's tody-tyrant is about 9 cm (3.5 in) long and weighs 7.7 to 9 g (0.27 to 0.32 oz). The sexes have the same plumage. Adults have a brownish olive crown. Their lores and a thin eye-ring are whitish on an otherwise brownish olive face. Their back and rump are brownish olive. Their wings are dusky olive-brown with whitish edges on the flight feathers and tips of the coverts; the latter show as two narrow wing bars. Their tail is dusky olive-brown. Their throat and underparts are mostly white with some faint grayish streaking. They have a whitish to pale gray iris, a gray bill, and gray legs and feet.

== Distribution and habitat ==
Sources differ on the range of Pelzeln's tody-tyrant. The International Ornithologists' Union and the Clements taxonomy list it as occurring only in Brazil. BirdLife International adds Suriname. The map in van Perlo's Field Guide to the Birds of Brazil shows the species on the Brazil/Venezuela border and the author does not state that the species is endemic to Brazil; Hilty's Birds of Venezuela states that it may occur in the southern part of the country. The Cornell Lab of Ornithology's Birds of the World places it in Brazil and "probably also in adjacent Venezuela and Colombia". The South American Classification Committee of the American Ornithological Society has documented records in all three of Brazil, Suriname, and Venezuela. All of the sources that provide detail agree that it is present in scattered sites along the Negro River and its tributaries, and Cornell and BirdLife International add sites in Brazil's Roraima and Pará states.

Pelzeln's tody-tyrant inhabits woodlands on campinarana white-sand soils. Trees there are typically stunted but may grow tall.

== Behavior ==
=== Movement ===
Pelzeln's tody-tyrant is believed to be a year-round resident.

=== Feeding ===
The diet and foraging technique of Pelzeln's tody-tyrant are not well known. It typically forages in the canopy and subcanopy. It is thought to mostly take prey like other members of its genus, using short upward sallies from a perch to grab it from the underside of leaves.

=== Breeding ===
Nothing is known about the breeding biology of Pelzeln's tody-tyrant.

=== Vocalization ===
The song of Pelzeln's tody-tyrant is a "rather low, modest series of 7-10 well-separated notes, rising at the end and accelerating to a short, upslurred trill".

== Status ==
The IUCN has assessed Pelzeln's tody-tyrant as being of Least Concern. Its population size is not known and is believed to be decreasing. No immediate threats have been identified. It is known only from widely scattered locations within its nominally large range. "Much of its habitat remains in relatively pristine condition owing to low human population density and inaccessibility, but cattle grazing, extraction of white sands, gold-mining and diamond-mining, and frequent fires pose serious local threats."
