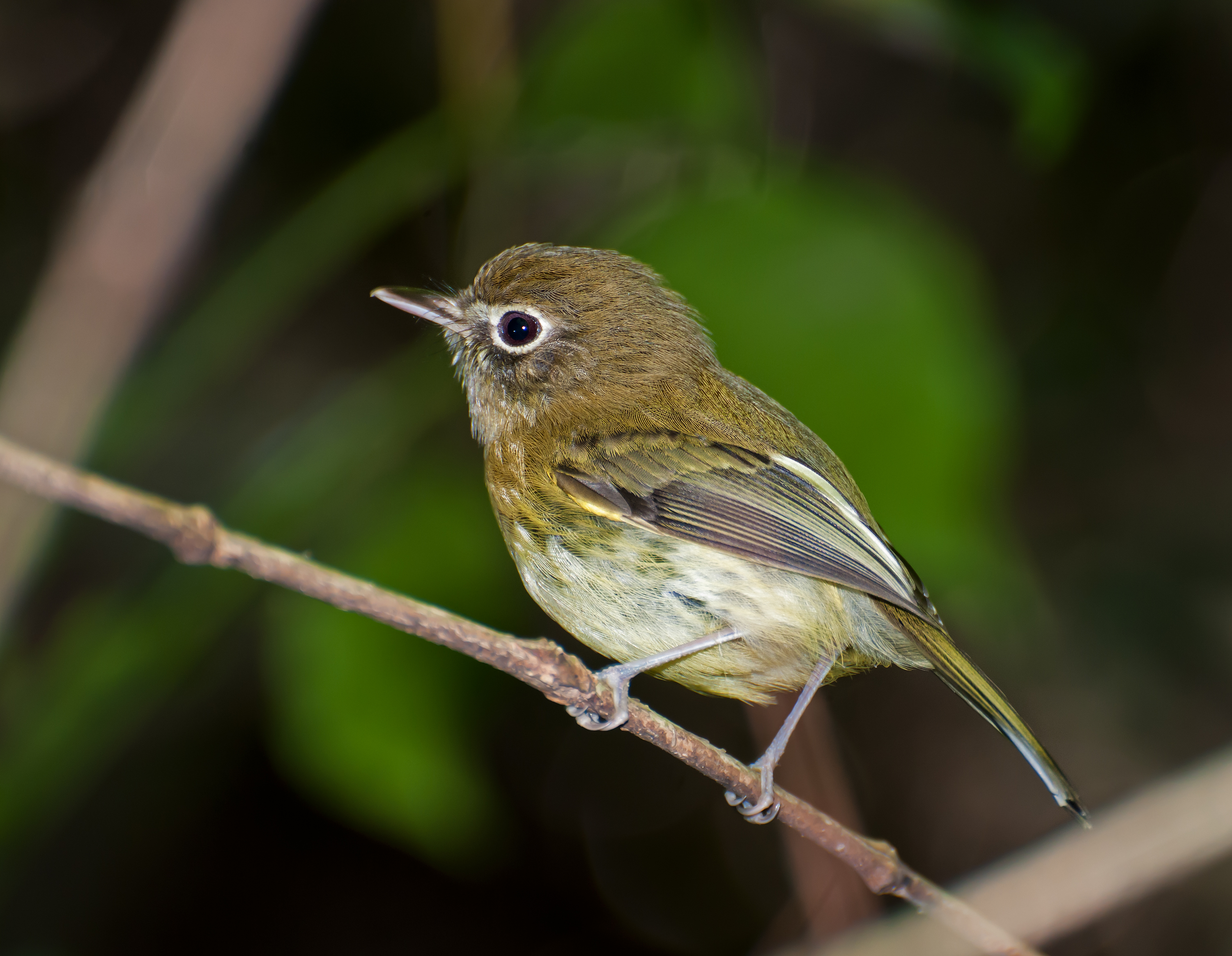
- In São Paulo, Brazil

Conservation status
- Least Concern (IUCN 3.1)

Scientific classification
- Kingdom: Animalia
- Phylum: Chordata
- Class: Aves
- Order: Passeriformes
- Family: Tyrannidae
- Genus: Hemitriccus
- Species: H. orbitatus

Binomial name
- Hemitriccus orbitatus (Wied, 1831)

= Eye-ringed tody-tyrant =

Species of bird

The eye-ringed tody-tyrant (Hemitriccus orbitatus) is a species of bird in the family Tyrannidae, the tyrant flycatchers. It is endemic to Brazil.

== Taxonomy and systematics ==
The eye-ringed tody-tyrant has a complicated taxonomic history. It was originally described in 1831 as Euscarthmornis orbitatus. In part of the twentieth century it was assigned to genus Idioptilon. Both Euscarthmornis and Idioptilon were eventually merged into Hemitriccus.

The eye-ringed tody-tyrant is monotypic.

== Description ==
The eye-ringed tody-tyrant is 11.5 to 12 cm (4.5 to 4.7 in) long and weighs 9 to 10.5 g (0.32 to 0.37 oz). The sexes have the same plumage. Adults have a dark olive crown. They have white spot above their lores and a wide white eye-ring. Their back and rump are dark olive. Their wings are olive with wide white edges on the innermost flight feathers. Their tail is dusky olive. Their throat is grayish white with olive streaks, their breast has an olive wash with darker olive streaks, and the rest of their underparts are yellow. They have a dark brown iris, a gray maxilla, a pale mandible, and light gray legs and feet.

== Distribution and habitat ==
The eye-ringed tody-tyrant is found in southeastern Brazil between eastern Minas Gerais and Espírito Santo to northeastern Rio Grande do Sul. It is a bird of the Atlantic Forest, inhabiting humid primary and secondary forest. In elevation it mostly occurs from sea level to 600 m (2,000 ft) but is occasionally found as high as 1,000 m (3,300 ft).

== Behavior ==
=== Movement ===
The eye-ringed tody-tyrant is a year-round resident.

=== Feeding ===
The eye-ringed tody-tyrant feeds on insects. It typically forages singly or in pairs, mostly in the forest interior between its understory and mid-story. It takes most of its prey using short upward sallies from a perch to grab it from the underside of leaves.

=== Breeding ===
The eye-ringed tody-tyrants nest has not been formally described but is reported as being a hanging "purse" or in one case a non-hanging ball. The clutch size is reported as two eggs. The species' breeding season, incubation period, time to fledging, and details of parental care are not known.

=== Vocalization ===
The eye-ringed tody-tyrant's song is a "very high, slightly lowered, 'drrrih' ".

== Status ==
The IUCN originally in 1988 assessed the eye-ringed tody-tyrant as Near Threatened but in February 2024 revised it to being of Least Concern. Its population size is not known and is believed to be decreasing. "Current key threats are urbanisation, industrialisation, agricultural expansion, mining, colonisation and associated road-building. However, the species can be found in secondary forests and is tolerant to certain environmental changes." It is considered locally uncommon to fairly common and occurs in some protected areas. However, "less than 20% of original Atlantic Forest [is] intact; remaining lowland forests continue to be cleared".
