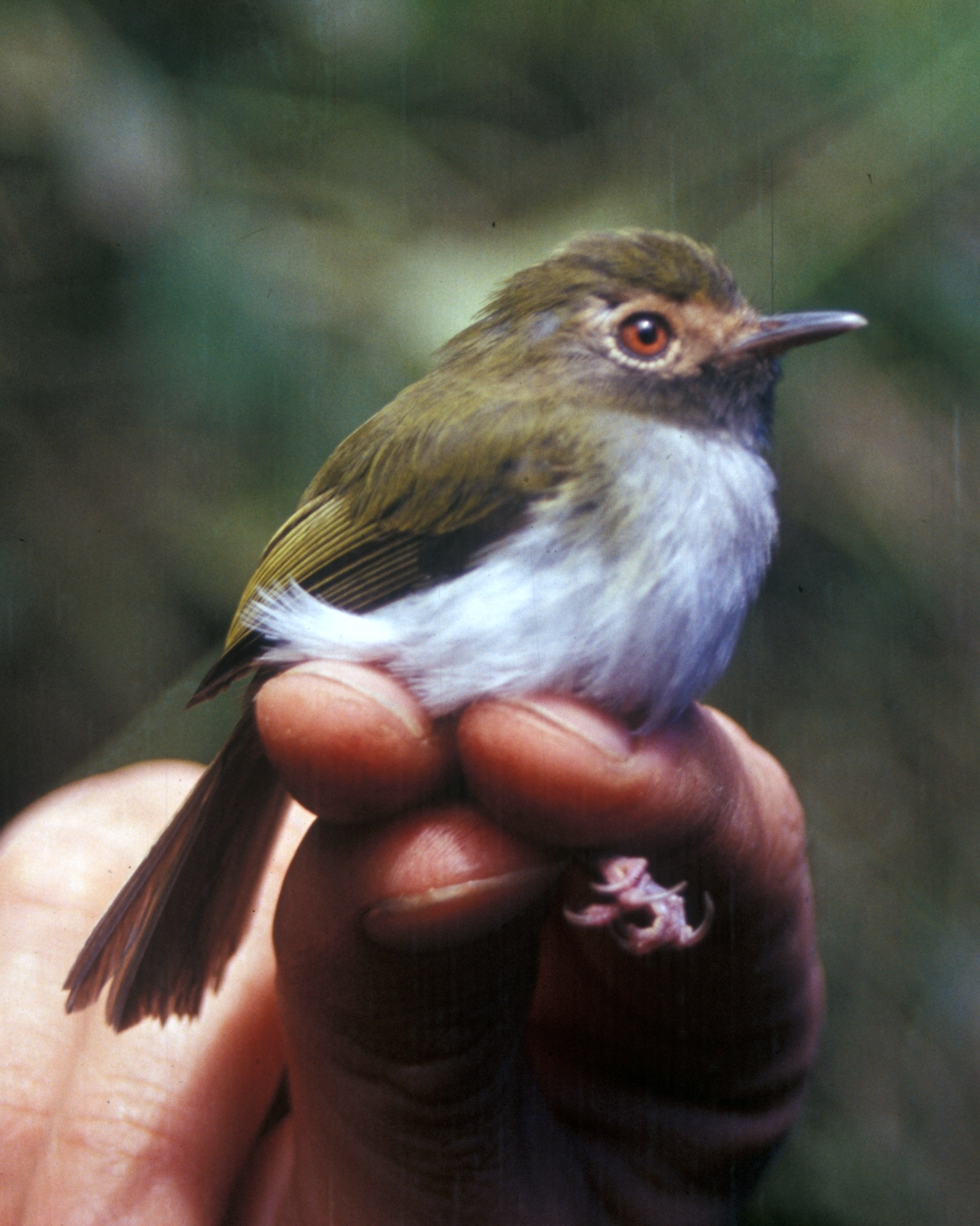
- Black-throated tody-tyrant (Hemitriccus granadensis)

Scientific classification
- Kingdom: Animalia
- Phylum: Chordata
- Class: Aves
- Order: Passeriformes
- Family: Tyrannidae
- Genus: Hemitriccus; Cabanis & Heine, 1860

Type species
- Muscicapa diops Temminck, 1822

Species
- see text

= Hemitriccus =

Genus of birds

Hemitriccus is a genus of small South American birds in the tyrant flycatcher family Tyrannidae. They are commonly known as tody-tyrants or bamboo tyrants, but the former name is (or was) also shared with several members of the genus Poecilotriccus. Several species from the genus Hemitriccus are very similar, and consequently best separated by their voice.

== Taxonomy ==
The genus Hemitriccus was introduced in 1860 by the German ornithologists Jean Cabanis and Ferdinand Heine to accommodate a single species, Muscicapa diops Temminck, 1822, the drab-breasted bamboo tyrant. The genus name combines the Ancient Greek hēmi- meaning "half-" or "small" with trikkos, a word for an unidentified small bird that in ornithology signifies a tyrant flycatcher.

== Species ==
The genus contains the following 22 species:

| Image | Common name | Scientific name | Distribution |
|---|---|---|---|
| | Drab-breasted bamboo tyrant | Hemitriccus diops | Atlantic Forest |
| | Brown-breasted bamboo tyrant | Hemitriccus obsoletus | southeastern Brazil |
| | Flammulated bamboo tyrant | Hemitriccus flammulatus | southwestern Amazonia |
| | Snethlage's tody-tyrant | Hemitriccus minor | Amazonia |
| | Yungas tody-tyrant | Hemitriccus spodiops | Yungas |
| | Acre tody-tyrant | Hemitriccus cohnhafti | Acre |
| | Boat-billed tody-tyrant | Hemitriccus josephinae | Guiana Shield |
| | White-eyed tody-tyrant | Hemitriccus zosterops | northern Amazonia |
| | White-bellied tody-tyrant | Hemitriccus griseipectus | southern Amazonia and Pernambuco coastal forests |
| | Zimmer's tody-tyrant | Hemitriccus minimus | southern Amazonia |
| | Eye-ringed tody-tyrant | Hemitriccus orbitatus | southern Atlantic Forest |
| | Johannes's tody-tyrant | Hemitriccus iohannis | western Amazonia |
| | Stripe-necked tody-tyrant | Hemitriccus striaticollis | northern South America |
| | Hangnest tody-tyrant | Hemitriccus nidipensulus | Atlantic Forest |
| | Pearly-vented tody-tyrant | Hemitriccus margaritaceiventer | northwestern and central/eastern South America |
| | Pelzeln's tody-tyrant | Hemitriccus inornatus | Brazil, north of the Amazon River |
| | Black-throated tody-tyrant | Hemitriccus granadensis | northern Andes |
| | Buff-breasted tody-tyrant | Hemitriccus mirandae | Caatinga moist-forest enclaves and Pernambuco Forests |
| | Cinnamon-breasted tody-tyrant | Hemitriccus cinnamomeipectus | Cordillera del Cóndor |
| | Kaempfer's tody-tyrant | Hemitriccus kaempferi | Serra do Mar coastal forests (south) |
| | Buff-throated tody-tyrant | Hemitriccus rufigularis | northern Andes |
| | Fork-tailed tody-tyrant | Hemitriccus furcatus | Serra do Mar coastal forests (north) |
