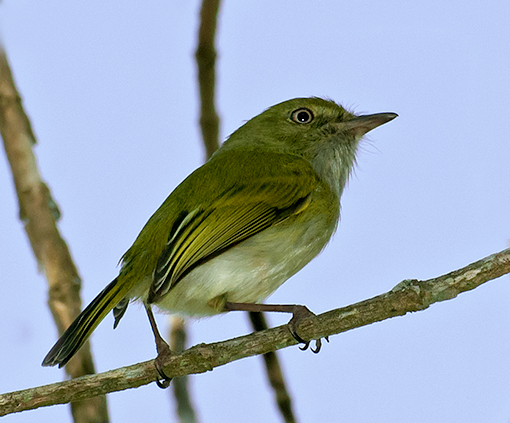
- In Minas Gerais, Brazil

Conservation status
- Least Concern (IUCN 3.1)

Scientific classification
- Kingdom: Animalia
- Phylum: Chordata
- Class: Aves
- Order: Passeriformes
- Family: Tyrannidae
- Genus: Hemitriccus
- Species: H. nidipendulus

Binomial name
- Hemitriccus nidipendulus (Wied, 1831)

= Hangnest tody-tyrant =

Species of bird

The hangnest tody-tyrant (Hemitriccus nidipendulus) is a species of bird in the family Tyrannidae, the tyrant flycatchers. It is endemic to Brazil.

== Taxonomy and systematics ==
The hangnest tody-tyrant has a complicated taxonomic history. It was originally described in 1831 as Euscarthmornis nidipendulus and was the type specimen for genus Euscarthmornis. In part of the twentieth century it was assigned to genus Idioptilon. Both Euscarthmornis and Idioptilon were eventually merged into Hemitriccus.

The hangnest tody-tyrant has two subspecies, the nominate H. n. nidipendulus (Wied, 1831) and H. n. paulistus (Hellmayr, 1914).

== Description ==
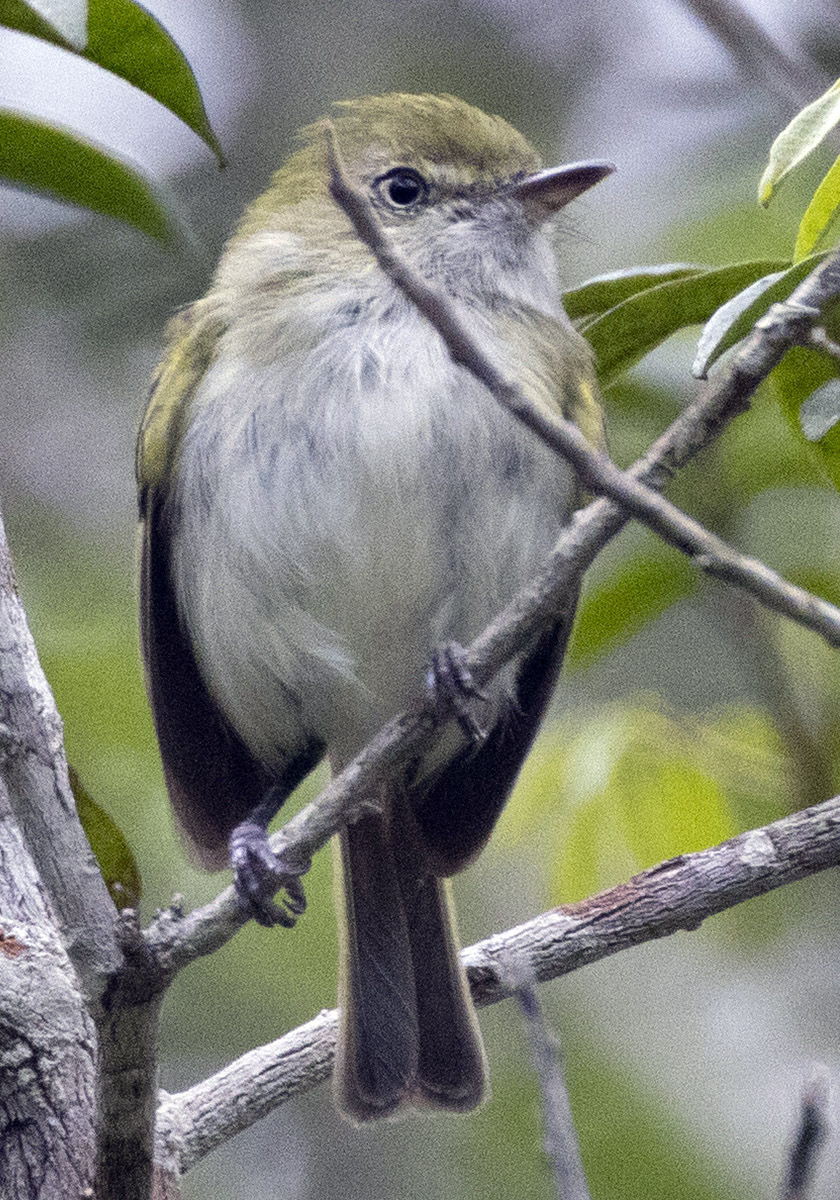
NE Brazil.

The hangnest tody-tyrant is 9.5 to 10 cm (3.7 to 3.9 in) long and weighs 7.2 to 8 g (0.25 to 0.28 oz). The sexes have the same plumage. Adults of the nominate subspecies have a bright olive-green crown. Their lores are yellowish olive and the rest of their face bright olive-green. Their back and rump are bright olive-green. Their wings are olive with yellow edges on the flight feathers and coverts. Their tail is olive. Their throat and underparts are mostly white with faint grayish olive streaks on the breast and flanks. Subspecies H. n. paulistus has the same plumage as the nominate but is slightly larger and has a longer tail. Both subspecies have a creamy white iris, a brown bill with a grayish pink base to the mandible, and light gray legs and feet.

== Distribution and habitat ==
The hangnest tody-tyrant has a disjunct distribution in southeastern Brazil. The nominate subspecies has a small range in Sergipe and northeastern Bahia states. Subspecies H. n. paulistus has a much larger range from southern Minas Gerais and Espírito Santo south to northeastern Paraná state. The species is a bird of the Atlantic Forest, where it inhabits humid restinga broadleaf and evergreen forests. It favors dense woodlands, secondary forest, and thickets of the fern Pteridium aquilinum. In elevation it ranges from sea level to 900 m (3,000 ft).

== Behavior ==
=== Movement ===
The hangnest tody-tyrant is a year-round resident.

=== Feeding ===
The hangnest tody-tyrant feeds on insects. It typically forages singly and occasionally in pairs, and is not known to join mixed-species feeding flocks. It mostly forages in thickets and tangles in the forest understory. It takes most of its prey using short upward sallies from a perch to grab it from the underside of leaves.

=== Breeding ===
The hangnest tody-tyrant's breeding season has not been defined but includes October. Its nest is a pear-shaped dome with a side entrance, made from grass and other plant fibers, stems, and rootlets lined with hair. It is often suspended from a twig about 1.5 m (5 ft) above a stream. The clutch is two eggs. The incubation period, time to fledging, and details of parental care are not known.

=== Vocalization ===
The hangnest tody-tyrant's song is a "very high, fast, rolling 'tidr-de-tidr-de-dir' ". Another rendition of it is "tiréé-téélili téélili téélili".

== Status ==
The IUCN originally in 1988 assessed the hangnest tody-tyrant as Near Threatened but since 2004 as being of Least Concern. It has a large range; its population size is not known and is believed to be decreasing. "Agricultural conversion and deforestation for mining and plantation production historically threatened its lowland forests; current threats are urbanization, industrialization, agricultural expansion, colonization and associated road-building." It is considered uncommon to common and occurs in several protected areas.
