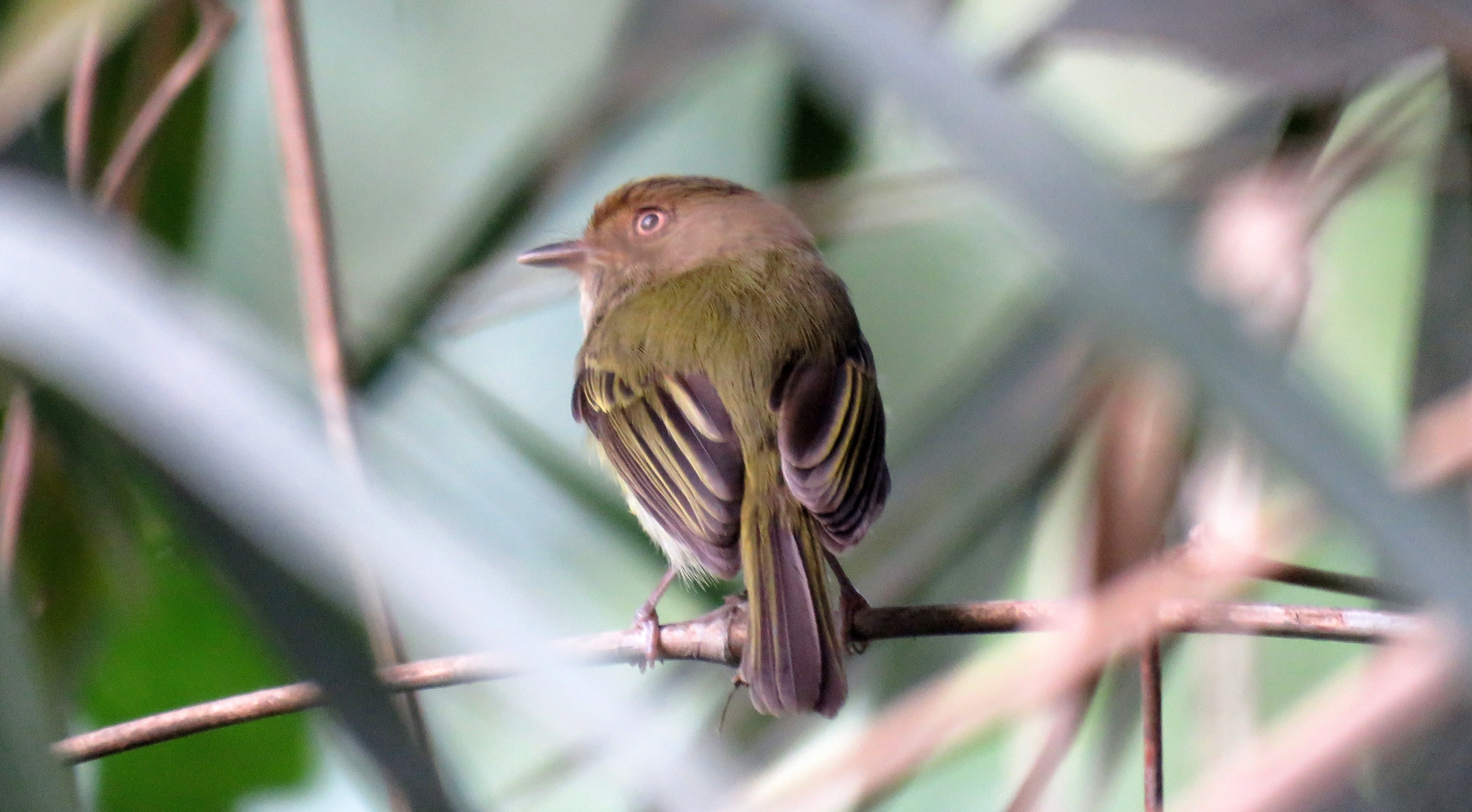

Conservation status
- Least Concern (IUCN 3.1)

Scientific classification
- Kingdom: Animalia
- Phylum: Chordata
- Class: Aves
- Order: Passeriformes
- Family: Tyrannidae
- Genus: Hemitriccus
- Species: H. spodiops

Binomial name
- Hemitriccus spodiops (Berlepsch, 1901)

= Yungas tody-tyrant =

Species of bird

The Yungas tody-tyrant (Hemitriccus spodiops) is a species of bird in the family Tyrannidae, the tyrant flycatchers. It is found in Bolivia and Peru.

== Taxonomy and systematics ==
The Yungas tody-tyrant was originally described as Euscarthmus spodiops. It was later variously placed in genera Idioptilon and Snethlagea; both were merged into Hemitriccus in the last half of the twentieth century.

The Yungas tody-tyrant is monotypic.

== Description ==
The Yungas tody-tyrant is about 11 cm (4.3 in) long and weighs 6.9 to 7.5 g (0.24 to 0.26 oz). The sexes have the same plumage. Adults have a dark olive-green crown with a short bushy crest. They have grayish buff lores on an otherwise olive-green face. Their back and rump are dark olive-green. Their wings and tail are dark olive green with yellowish olive ends on the coverts that show as two somewhat indistinct wing bars. Their throat and underparts are mostly grayish olive with faint whitish streaks except on the clear yellowish white belly. They have a pale yellow iris and pinkish gray to pinkish legs and feet. Their blackish bill is flattish with a wide base.

== Distribution and habitat ==
The Yungas tody-tyrant's range is almost entirely in western and central Bolivia and extends slightly into extreme southeastern Peru. It is found from Bolivia's western Santa Cruz Department west through Cochabamba and La Paz departments into eastern Puno Department, Peru, in the upper watershed of the Inambari River. It inhabits the Yungas biome, where it occurs at the edges of humid montane forest, in mature secondary growth along roads and in openings caused by landslides, and in stands of bamboo. In elevation it mostly ranges between 800 and 1,600 m (2,600 and 5,200 ft) but occasionally reaches 2,450 m (8,000 ft).

== Behavior ==
=== Movement ===
The Yungas tody-tyrant is a year-round resident.

=== Feeding ===
The Yungas tody-tyrant feeds on insects. It typically forages singly and is not known to join mixed-species feeding flocks. It feeds mostly in thick undergrowth within about 1 to 3 m (3 to 10 ft) above the ground, using short upward sallies from a perch to glean prey from the underside of vegetation.

=== Breeding ===
Nothing is known about the Yungas tody-tyrant's breeding biology.

=== Vocalization ===
The Yungas tody-tyrant's song is "a harsh, rapid, descending trill" brEEeeeew"; sometimes it instead is level or rising. Its calls are "quiet tuk or bink notes".

== Status ==
The IUCN has assessed the Yungas tody-tyrant as being of Least Concern. Its population size is not known and is believed to be decreasing. No immediate threats have been identified. It is considered uncommon to locally common and occurs in all of the protected areas of Yungas in Cochabamba and La Paz departments.
