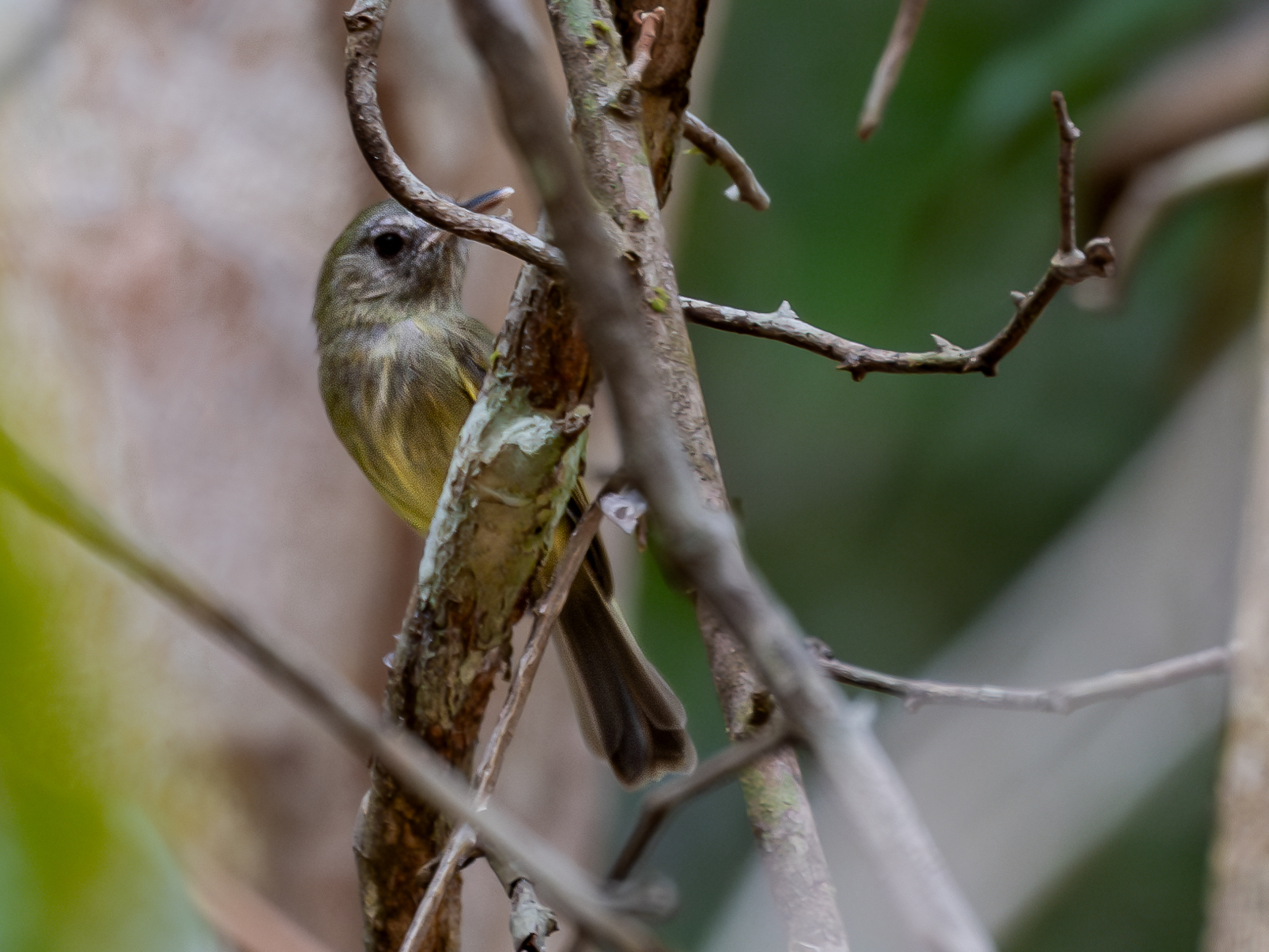

Conservation status
- Least Concern (IUCN 3.1)

Scientific classification
- Kingdom: Animalia
- Phylum: Chordata
- Class: Aves
- Order: Passeriformes
- Family: Tyrannidae
- Genus: Hemitriccus
- Species: H. josephinae

Binomial name
- Hemitriccus josephinae (Chubb, 1914)

= Boat-billed tody-tyrant =

Species of bird

The boat-billed tody-tyrant (Hemitriccus josephinae) is a species of bird in the family Tyrannidae, the tyrant flycatchers. It is found in Brazil, French Guiana, Guyana, and Suriname.

== Taxonomy and systematics ==
The boat-billed tody-tyrant was originally described as Euscarthmus josephinae. The species' specific epithet honors the daughter of F. V. McConnell, whose collection held the type specimen. The species for a time was placed alone in genus Microcochlearius which was later merged into Hemitriccus.

The boat-billed tody-tyrant is monotypic.

== Description ==
The boat-billed tody-tyrant is about 11 cm (4.3 in) long and weighs 10.2 to 10.5 g (0.36 to 0.37 oz). The sexes have the same plumage. Adults have a dull olive crown and nape. They have pale gray lores and ear coverts on an otherwise olive face. Their back and rump are dull olive. Their wings are plain olive and their tail dusky brownish olive. Their throat is dingy grayish white, their breast and belly pale yellow, and their crissum buffy. They have a reddish brown iris and light gray legs and feet. Their bill has a wide base; it is gray with a pale base to the mandible.

== Distribution and habitat ==
The boat-billed tody-tyrant is found across most of the area of the Guianas, south into Brazil to the area of Manaus, and east in that country to the Atlantic in Amapá. There is speculation that it also occurs in eastern Venezuela but the South American Classification Committee of the American Ornithological Society has no records there. The species inhabits humid evergreen forest where it favors the forest edge, vine tangles, and gaps such as those caused by fallen trees.

== Behavior ==
=== Movement ===
The boat-billed tody-tyrant is a year-round resident.

=== Feeding ===
The boat-billed tody-tyrant feeds on insects. It typically forages singly or in pairs and sometimes joins mixed-species feeding flocks. It feeds mostly in dense vegetation in the forest's middle story about 6 to 9 m (20 to 30 ft) above the ground, using short upward sallies from a perch to glean prey from vegetation and branches.

=== Breeding ===
Nothing is known about the boat-billed tody-tyrant's breeding biology.

=== Vocalization ===
What could be either the song or call of the boat-billed tody-tyrant is a "high, falling, slightly nasal 'pic-pic---' ". It also makes pic notes singly, a rising and falling series of about five pic notes, and "a rapid swelling and then descending series of 7-15 quick pic notes".

== Status ==
The IUCN has assessed the boat-billed tody-tyrant as being of Least Concern. It has a large range; its population size is not known and is believed to be decreasing. No immediate threats have been identified. It is considered generally rare and occurs in a few protected areas.
