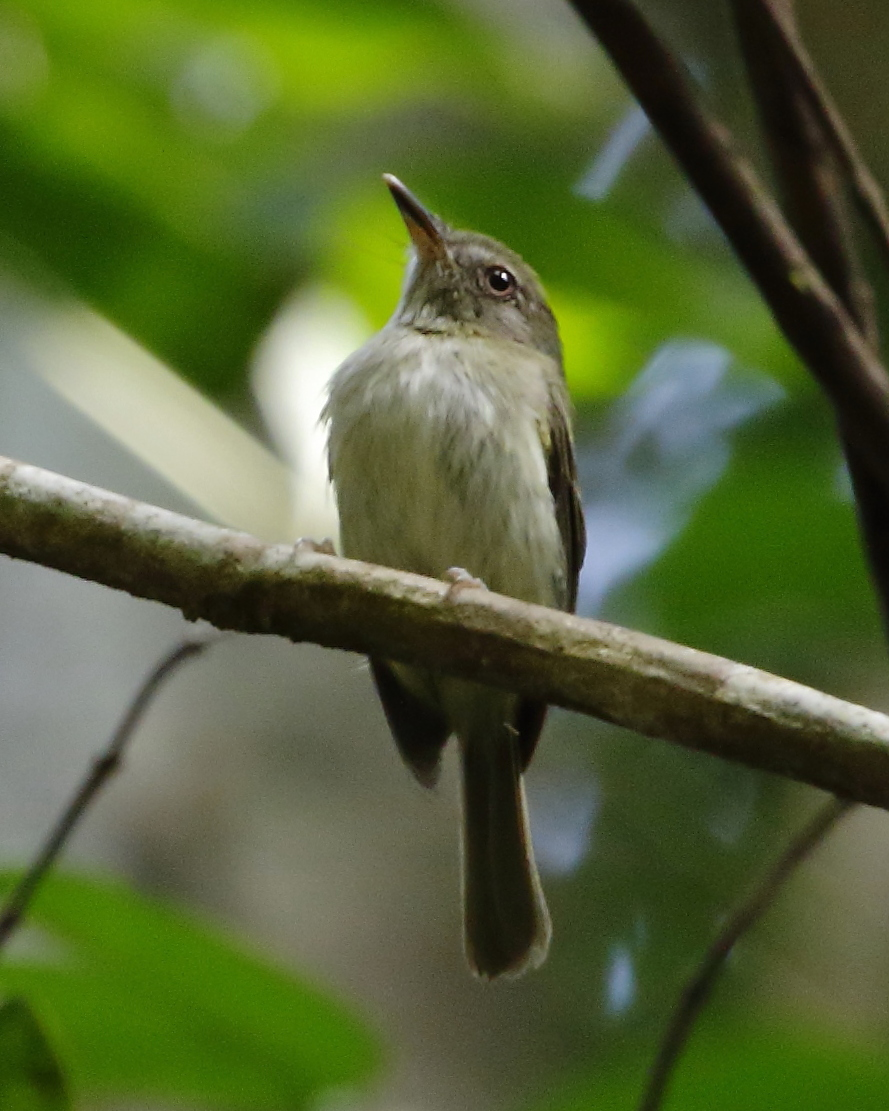
- Carajás National Forest; Pará state, Brazil

Conservation status
- Least Concern (IUCN 3.1)

Scientific classification
- Kingdom: Animalia
- Phylum: Chordata
- Class: Aves
- Order: Passeriformes
- Family: Tyrannidae
- Genus: Hemitriccus
- Species: H. minor

Binomial name
- Hemitriccus minor (Snethlage, 1907)

= Snethlage's tody-tyrant =

Species of bird

Snethlage's tody-tyrant (Hemitriccus minor) is a species of bird in the family Tyrannidae, the tyrant flycatchers. It is found in Bolivia, Brazil, Venezuela, and possibly Peru.

== Taxonomy and systematics ==
Snethlage's tody-tyrant was originally described as a subspecies, Euscarthmus zosterops minor, of what is now the white-eyed tody-tyrant (Hemitriccus zosterops). It was later accepted as a full species. For a time in the mid-twentieth century several authors placed it in genus Snethlagea, which was later merged into Hemitriccus.

Major taxonomic systems recognize three subspecies of Snethlage's tody-tyrant, the nominate H. m. minor (Snethlage, 1907), H. m. snethlageae (Emil Heinrich Snethlage, 1937), and H. m. pallens (Todd, 1925). One of them, the Clements taxonomy, in addition lists "Hemitriccus minor [undescribed form]" as potentially a new subspecies from within one of the others.

The species' English name and the subspecific epithet of H. m. snethlageae commemorate the German-born Brazilian naturalist and ornithologist Emilie Snethlage (1868-1929).

== Description ==
Snethlage's tody-tyrant is about 10 cm (3.9 in) long and weighs 7 to 7.9 g (0.25 to 0.28 oz). The sexes have similar plumage. Adults of the nominate subspecies have an olive-green crown with a short bushy crest. Their face, back, and rump are olive-green. Their wings and tail are olive with greenish yellow edges on the flight feathers and yellowish ends on the coverts; the last show as two somewhat indistinct wing bars. Their throat and underparts are mostly pale yellow with faint grayish olive streaks except on the center of the belly. Some individuals have mostly white underparts. Females have slightly brighter upperparts and yellower underparts than males. Subspecies H. m. pallens has paler underparts and more distinct wing bars than the nominate. H. m. snethlageae is smaller than the nominate, with a shorter tail, yellower and more distinct wing bars, and brighter yellow underparts. All subspecies have a white to pale yellow iris and gray to pinkish gray legs and feet. Their bill is flattish with a wide base; it is mostly brown to blackish with a pinkish base to the mandible.

== Distribution and habitat ==
Snethlage's tody-tyrant is a bird of the Amazon Basin, though sources differ on the distribution of the subspecies within it.

According to Clock in the Cornell Lab of Ornithology's Birds of the World, the nominate subspecies is the easternmost. It is found in Brazil's Pará state in the area of the lower Xingu and Tocantins rivers. Subspecies H. m. snethlageae is the most widespread. Clock places it in central Brazil from the Madeira River east to the Tapajos River and south to northern Rondônia and Mato Grosso states and into northeastern Bolivia's Beni and Santa Cruz departments. Clock places H. m. pallens on both sides of the Amazon from near the Peruvian border in western Amazonas state east to the Negro and Madeira rivers. The Clements taxonomy generally agrees with Clock, sometimes providing a little more detail. (Cornell maintains the Clements taxonomy so the two are not wholly independent.)

The IOC World Bird List places the nominate subspecies in "se Amazonian Brazil", H. m. snethlageae in "w Amazonian Brazil", and H. m. pallens in "c Amazonian Brazil to ne Bolivia". This source switches the ranges of snethlageae and pallens as defined by Cornell/Clements.

In addition to the ranges described by the above sources, the South American Classification Committee of the American Ornithological Society (SACC) places the species in Venezuela without naming a subspecies. Hilty's Birds of Venezuela notes four records in southwestern Amazonas state adjacent to northwestern Brazil and assigns them to H. m. pallens. This assignment is consistent with the Cornell/Clements range of that subspecies. Secondly, Schulenberg et al. include Snethlage's tody-tyrant in their Birds of Peru but with the caveat that it is known in the country only from sight records. They do not assign a subspecies. The SACC concurs and lists the species as hypothetical in Peru due to the lack of documented records.

The nominate subspecies and subspecies H. m. snethlageae of Snethlage's tody-tyrant inhabit terra firme and mature secondary tropical evergreen forest. Subspecies H. m. pallens primarily inhabits igapó forest. In all landscapes it mostly keeps to vine tangles and other dense vegetation at the forest edge and in gaps caused by fallen trees.

== Behavior ==
=== Movement ===
Snethlage's tody-tyrant is a year-round resident.

=== Feeding ===
Snethlage's tody-tyrant feeds on insects. It typically forages singly or in pairs and is not known to join mixed-species feeding flocks. It feeds mostly in thick undergrowth between about 3 and 8 m (10 and 25 ft) above the ground, using short upward sallies from a perch to glean prey from the underside of vegetation.

=== Breeding ===
The nest of Snethlage's tody-tyrant has been anecdotally reported as being similar to that of other Hemitriccus tody-tyrants. Nothing else is known about the species' breeding biology.

=== Vocalization ===
What may be either the song or call of Snethlage's tody-tyrant is a "short, gravelly, downslurred 'drrru' trill". There is some variation in its pitch, speed, and length among the subspecies.

== Status ==
The IUCN has assessed Snethlage's tody-tyrant as being of Least Concern. It has a very large range; its population size is not known and is believed to be decreasing. No immediate threats have been identified. It is considered locally fairly common to common in Brazil and Bolivia and occurs in protected areas in both countries.
