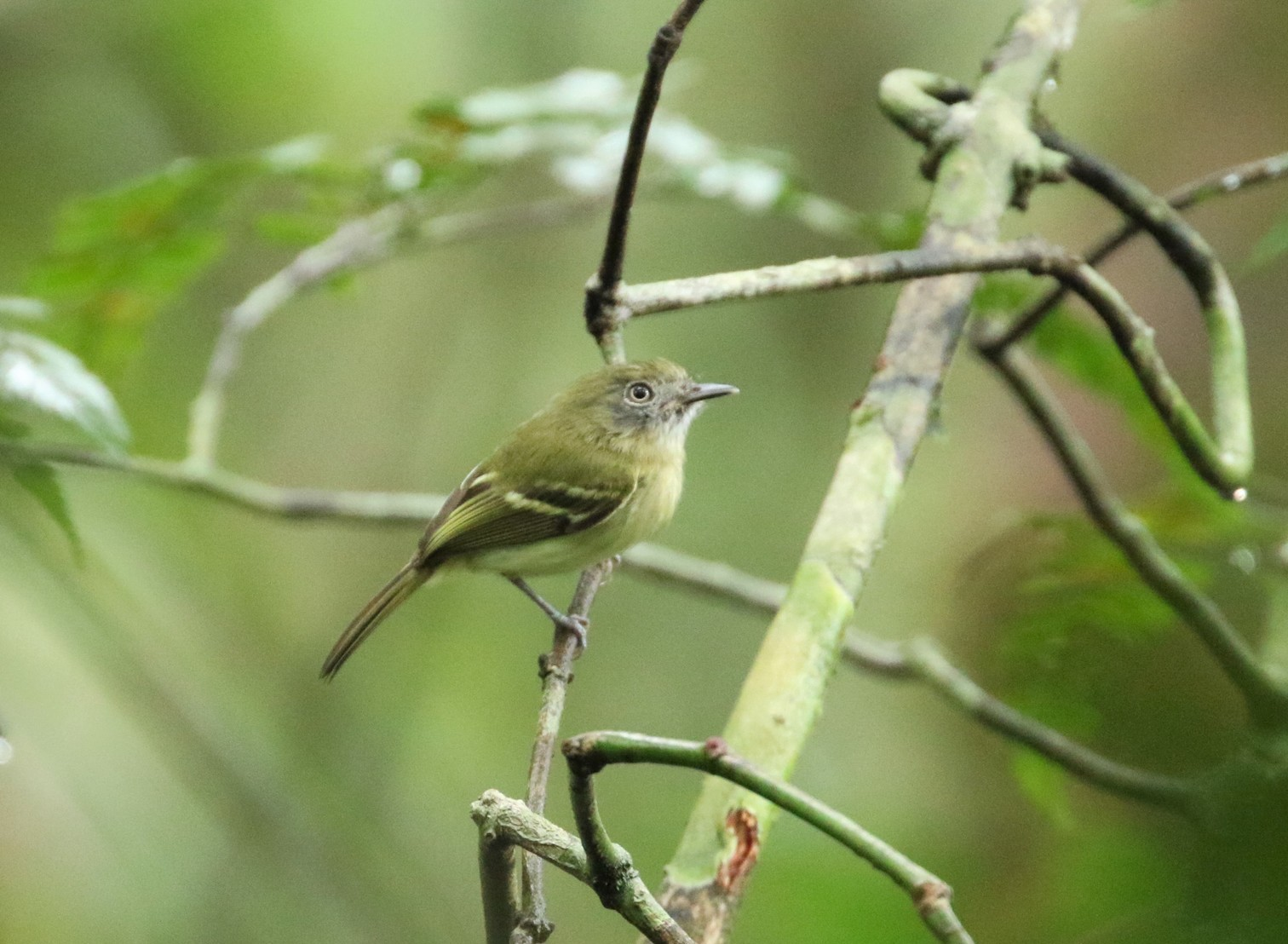

Conservation status
- Least Concern (IUCN 3.1)

Scientific classification
- Kingdom: Animalia
- Phylum: Chordata
- Class: Aves
- Order: Passeriformes
- Family: Tyrannidae
- Genus: Hemitriccus
- Species: H. zosterops

Binomial name
- Hemitriccus zosterops (Pelzeln, 1868)

= White-eyed tody-tyrant =

Species of bird

The white-eyed tody-tyrant (Hemitriccus zosterops) is a species of bird in the family Tyrannidae, the tyrant flycatchers. It is found in Brazil, Colombia, Ecuador, French Guiana, Guyana, Peru, Suriname, and Venezuela.

== Taxonomy and systematics ==
The white-eyed tody-tyrant has two subspecies, the nominate H. z. zosterops (Pelzeln, 1868) and H. z. flaviviridis (Zimmer, JT, 1940).

The species had a complicated taxonomic history from its original description to late in the twentieth century. It was described as Euscarthmus zosterops. It was later moved to genus Idioptilon, and later still both Euscarthmus and Idioptilon were merged into Hemitriccus. In the early twentieth century some authors treated what is now the white-eyed tody-tyrant as a subspecies of the stripe-necked tody-tyrant (H. striaticollis). And what is now the white-bellied tody-tyrant (H. griseipectus) was for a time treated as conspecific with the white-eyed.

== Description ==
The white-eyed tody-tyrant is about 11 cm (4.3 in) long and weighs 7.8 to 10 g (0.28 to 0.35 oz). The sexes have the same plumage. Adults of the nominate subspecies have an olive-green crown and nape. They have a whitish spot above the lores and an indistinct white eye-ring on an otherwise grayish olive face. Their back and rump are olive-green. Their wings are dusky with bright olive-yellow edges on the flight feathers and yellowish tips on the coverts; the latter show as two distinct wing bars. Their tail dusky olive. Their throat is gray with dusky streaks, their breast and flanks are streaked with olive and yellow, and their belly is unstreaked pale yellow. Subspecies H. z. flaviviridis has brighter, more yellowish green upperparts than the nominate and stronger yellow streaking on the underparts. Both subspecies have a pale gray or straw-yellow (or sometimes reddish brown) iris, a black bill with a pinkish base to the mandible, and dark gray legs and feet.

== Distribution and habitat ==
The white-eyed tody-tyrant is a bird of the northern Amazon Basin. The nominate subspecies is by far the more widespread. It is found from Caquetá Department in southeastern Colombia south through eastern Ecuador into northeastern Peru's Department of Loreto and from Colombia east across Venezuela's southern Amazonas State, the Guianas, and most of northern Brazil north of the Amazon. Subspecies H. z. flaviviridis is found only in northern Peru west of the Napo and Ucayali rivers from central Amazonas Department south to Cuzco Department. The species inhabits humid terra firme forest in lowlands and foothills. In elevation it reaches 500 m (1,600 ft) in Colombia, 1,000 m (3,300 ft) in Ecuador, 1,350 m (4,400 ft) in Peru, 200 m (700 ft) in Venezuela, and 850 m (2,800 ft) in Brazil.

== Behavior ==
=== Movement ===
The white-eyed tody-tyrant is a year-round resident.

=== Feeding ===
The white-eyed tody-tyrant feeds on arthropods. It typically forages singly or in pairs, and only occasionally joins mixed-species feeding flocks. It feeds mostly in the forest's lower to middle levels, using short upward sallies from a perch to grab prey from vegetation.

=== Breeding ===
The white-eyed tody-tyrant's nest is reported anecdotally as pendant, but nothing else is known about the species' breeding biology.

=== Vocalization ===
The white-eyed tody-tyrant's song is variously described as "a simple staccato 'pik, pik-pik-pik-pik' sometimes accelerated into 'pik-pik-pik-pikpikpikpik' ", "a higher note followed by a falling, rapid series PEEP-ip'ip'ip'ip'ip, and as "a very high, short, very dry, sharp, slightly slowing and descending rattling trill". Its call is a "very high, sharp, dry 'pic' " or "a single 'pip' sometimes in a slow series".

== Status ==
The IUCN has assessed the white-eyed tody-tyrant as being of Least Concern. It has a very large range; its population size is not known and is believed to be decreasing. No immediate threats have been identified. It is considered uncommon to locally fairly common overall, and is described as local in Colombia and Ecuador and locally common in Peru. It occurs in a few protected areas.
