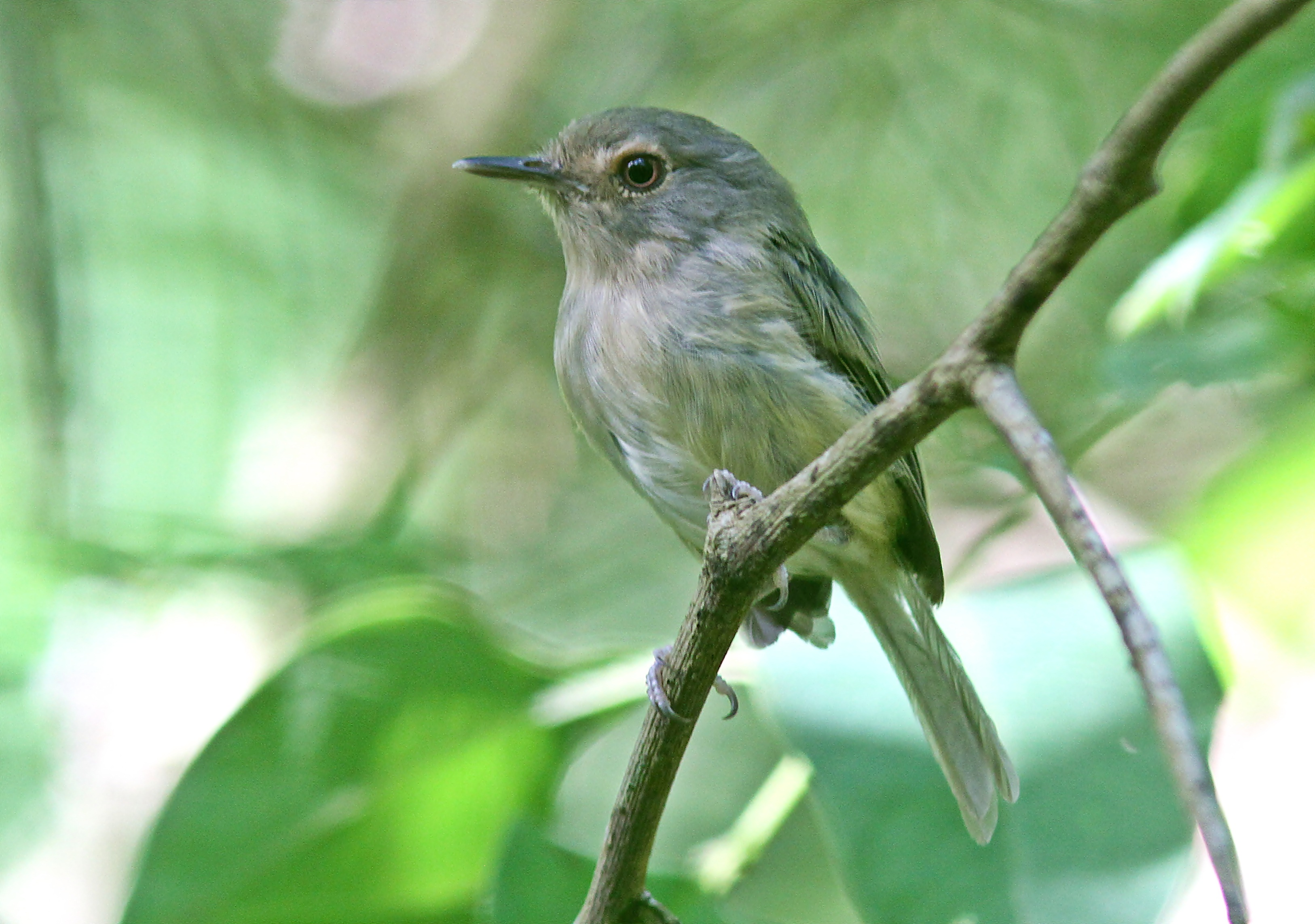

Conservation status
- Vulnerable (IUCN 3.1)

Scientific classification
- Kingdom: Animalia
- Phylum: Chordata
- Class: Aves
- Order: Passeriformes
- Family: Tyrannidae
- Genus: Hemitriccus
- Species: H. mirandae

Binomial name
- Hemitriccus mirandae (Snethlage, 1925)

= Buff-breasted tody-tyrant =

Species of bird

The buff-breasted tody-tyrant (Hemitriccus mirandae) is a species of bird in the family Tyrannidae, the tyrant flycatchers. It is endemic to Brazil.

== Taxonomy and systematics ==
The buff-breasted tody-tyrant has a complicated taxonomic history. It was originally described in 1925 as Todirostrum mirandae. Later in the twentieth century it was moved to genus Idioptilon which was later still merged into Hemitriccus. The buff-breasted tody-tyrant is now monotypic. However, what is now Kaempfer's tody-tyrant (H. kaempferi) was previously treated as a subspecies of it.

== Description ==
The buff-breasted tody-tyrant is about 10 cm (3.9 in) long. The sexes have the same plumage. Adults have a darkish olive crown and pale creamy buff face. Their back and rump are darkish olive. Their wings are dusky olive with wide creamy edges on the innermost secondaries. Their tail is dusky olive. Their throat and breast are pale creamy buff, their belly more whitish, and their crissum pale yellow. They have an orange iris, a gray maxilla, a paler mandible, and gray to pale pinkish legs and feet.

== Distribution and habitat ==
The buff-breasted tody-tyrant has a disjunct distribution in northeastern Brazil, intermittently in the states of Ceará, Paraíba, Pernambuco, and Alagoas. It inhabits semi-humid forest both primary and secondary in the highlands. It occurs only on the slopes of isolated ridges between 600 and 1,000 m (2,000 and 3,300 ft).

== Behavior ==
=== Movement ===
The buff-breasted tody-tyrant is a year-round resident.

=== Feeding ===
The buff-breasted tody-tyrant feeds on insects. It typically forages singly and is not known to join mixed-species feeding flocks. It mostly forages from the forest's understory to its middle levels, often in dense vine tangles, between about 2 and 5 m (7 and 16 ft) above the ground. It mostly takes prey using short upward sallies from a perch to grab it from the underside of leaves.

=== Breeding ===
The buff-breasted tody-tyrant's nest has anecdotally been described as "pendant". Nothing else is known about the species' breeding biology.

=== Vocalization ===
The buff-breasted tody-tyrant's song is a "short series of 7-8 sharp, well-accentuated notes, slightly accelerating and ascending". It has been written as "kt-kit-kit-kiit-kiit-kiiit-kit".

== Status ==
The IUCN has assessed the buff-breasted tody-tyrant as Vulnerable. It has a disjunct distribution and its estimated population of between 1500 and 7000 mature individuals is believed to be decreasing. "There has been massive deforestation within its disjunct and fragmented range [and the] remaining areas of forest within the range are highly fragmented." It is considered uncommon and very local. It occurs in several protected areas but "[o]nly the protection of intact forest can secure the long-term survival of this tyrannid".
