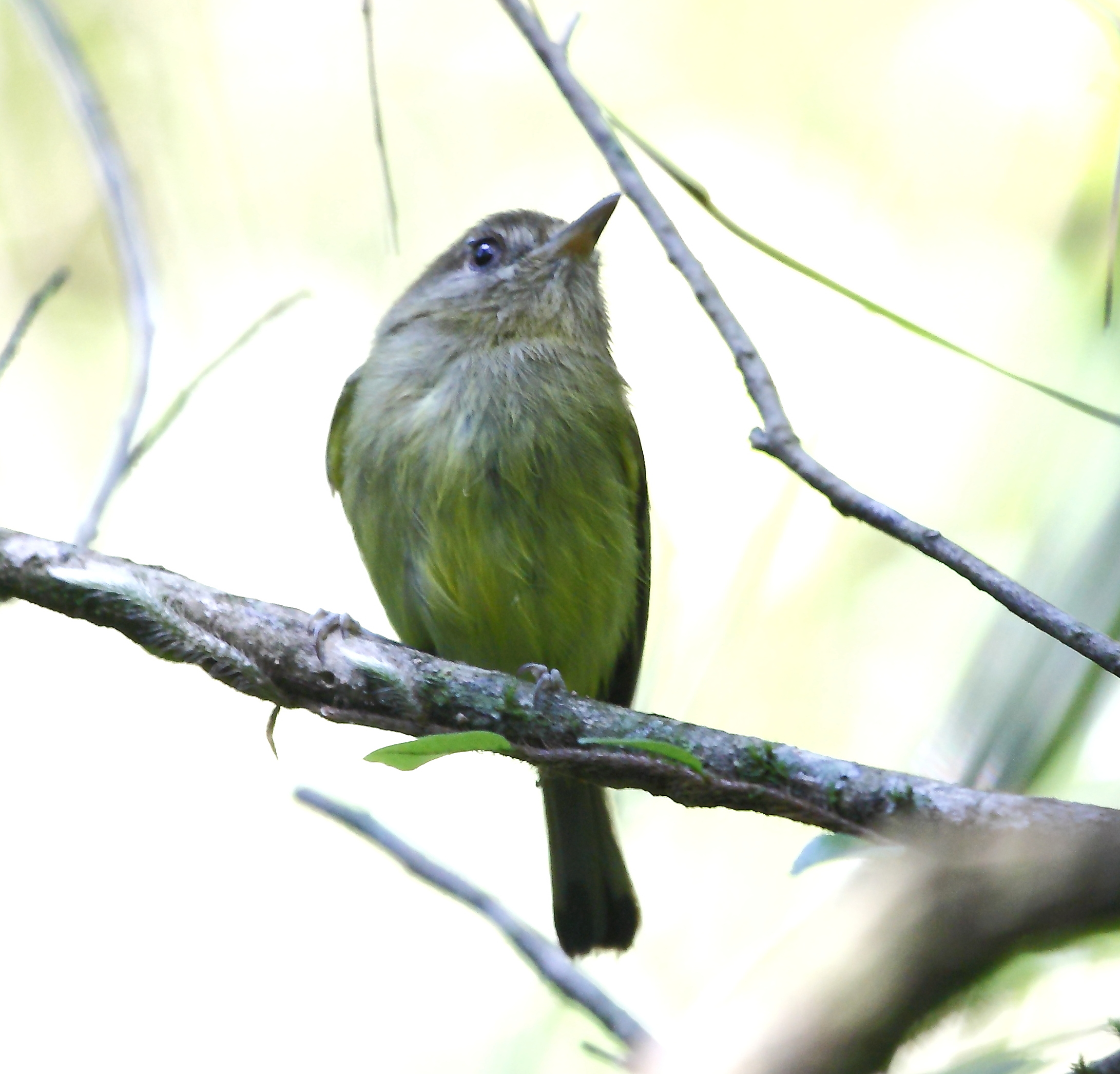
- At Joinville, Santa Catarina state, Brazil

Conservation status
- Vulnerable (IUCN 3.1)

Scientific classification
- Kingdom: Animalia
- Phylum: Chordata
- Class: Aves
- Order: Passeriformes
- Family: Tyrannidae
- Genus: Hemitriccus
- Species: H. kaempferi

Binomial name
- Hemitriccus kaempferi (Zimmer, 1953)

= Kaempfer's tody-tyrant =

Species of bird

Kaempfer's tody-tyrant (Hemitriccus kaempferi) is a rare species of bird in the family Tyrannidae, the tyrant flycatchers. It is native to the Serra do Mar coastal forests.

== Taxonomy and systematics ==
Kaempfer's tody-tyrant was originally described in 1953 as Idioptilon mirandae kaempferi, a subspecies of the buff-breasted tody-tyrant (now Hemitriccus mirandae). Following a study published in 1976 it was elevated to species rank. At about that same time genus Idioptilon was merged into Hemitriccus.

Kaempfer's tody-tyrant is monotypic.

== History ==
Kaempfer's tody-tyrant was long known only from two specimens, the type specimen collected in 1929 and another in 1950; the second was only later correctly identified. It was not seen again until 1991 and then intermittently after that.

== Description ==
Kaempfer's tody-tyrant is about 10 cm (3.9 in) long. The sexes have the same plumage. Adults have a buffy olive crown and buffy face, sometimes with some rufous. Their back and rump are dark olive. Their wings are dark olive with wide pale yellow or greenish yellow outer webs on the innermost secondaries. Their wing coverts have buffish yellow-olive tips that show as two wing bars. Their tail is dusky olive with pale tips on the outer feathers. Their throat is yellow to buff and their breast is dull ochraceous buff with a greenish olive wash. Their belly is pale yellow with a sharp edge between it and the breast. They have a brown to warm fawn-brown iris, a gray maxilla, a paler mandible, and dark gray legs and feet.

== Distribution and habitat ==
Kaempfer's tody-tyrant was known from a few localities in southeastern Brazil's Santa Catarina state. By 2025 it was known from 10 sites in northeastern Santa Catarina and one in adjacent southeastern Paraná. It is native to the Serra do Mar coastal forests, where it inhabits tropical evergreen forest, early-stage secondary forest, and open low-stature woodland. It favors thick undergrowth, often with Cecropia and Heliconia, and often near rivers. In elevation it is known only from near sea level to about 250 m (800 ft).

== Behavior ==
=== Movement ===
Kaempfer's tody-tyrant is a year-round resident.

=== Feeding ===
Kaempfer's tody-tyrant feeds on insects. It typically forages singly or in pairs and is not known to join mixed-species feeding flocks. It mostly forages in dense vegetation between about 0.5 and 3 m (2 and 10 ft) above the ground. It takes prey using short upward sallies from a perch to grab it from the underside of leaves and also while briefly hovering after a short flight.

=== Breeding ===
The one known nest of Kaempfer's tody-tyrant was discovered in October 1998. It was a partially concealed longish cup made mostly from moss with some grass and dead leaves. Both members of a pair were building the nest. It was wrapped around a horizontal branch about 6 m (20 ft) above the ground. Nothing else is known about the species' breeding biology.

=== Vocalization ===
The primary vocalization of Kaempfer's tody-tyrant is a "high-pitched, nasal, strident and raspy 'kuı´t-kuı´t' or 'kwit-kwit', sometimes given as 'kwit kwit-kwit kwit-kwit-kwit-kwit' ".

== Status ==
The IUCN originally in 1988 assessed Kaempfer's tody-tyrant as Threatened, then in 1994 as Endangered, in 2004 as Critically Endangered, in 2009 again as Endangered, and since 2017 as Vulnerable. It has a "very small and severely fragmented range"; its estimated population of between 6000 and 12,000 mature individuals is believed to be decreasing. "Deforestation has been extensive in the Atlantic forest, and lowland forest remaining in the vicinity of all sites continues to be cleared. The main threats for the species are apparently banana, rice and timber plantations and the urbanisation of the coastal plain." It is known from two reserves. It is considered Vulnerable under Brazilian law and is on the United States' Endangered Species List..
