= Eye-ring =

Anatomical feature in birds

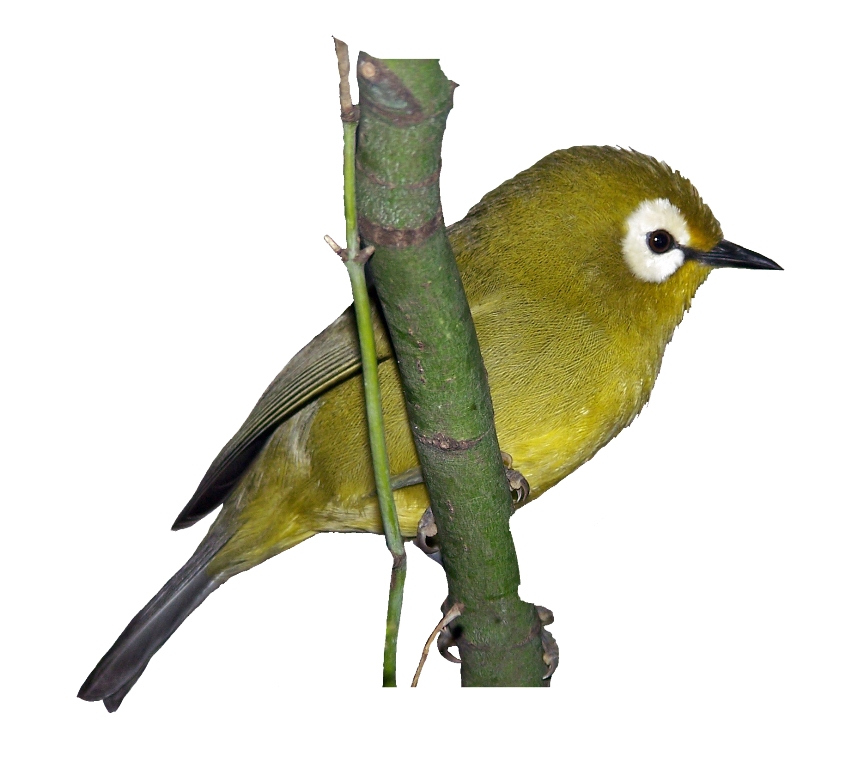
White-eyes are named for the conspicuous white eye-rings found in the majority of species. Their genus name Zosterops likewise means "eye-girdle".

The eye-ring of a bird is a ring of tiny feathers that surrounds the orbital ring, a ring of bare skin immediately surrounding a bird's eye. The eye-ring is often decorative, and its colour may contrast with adjoining plumage. The ring of feathers is sometimes incomplete, forming an eye arc. In the absence of a conspicuous eye-ring, the orbital ring of a bird is often referred to as the eye-ring. The bare orbital ring may be hardened or fleshy, or may form an eye-wattle. These are useful field marks in many bird species, and the eye-ringed flatbill, eye-ringed tody-tyrant and eye-ringed thistletail are examples of species named for either of these.

== Function ==
Eye-rings are believed to convey various types of signals between individual birds. Some eye-rings appear only at sexual maturity, while others suggest the individual's age or health status. Individual birds may be included or excluded from reproductive capability due to signals conveyed by the eye-ring. Red carotenoid-based colors of the orbital rings of pheasants are known to be related to health.

The function of the white eye-rings in white-eyes is unknown. It is suspected that they may serve to highlight infestations of small ectoparasites around the eyes. Untainted white eye-rings may consequently express vigorous health. In addition they may signal membership of a particular group or population, as different species and populations may have rings of differing colour, size, shape or completeness. These recognition signals could then play a role in reproductive isolation and speciation.

== Gallery ==
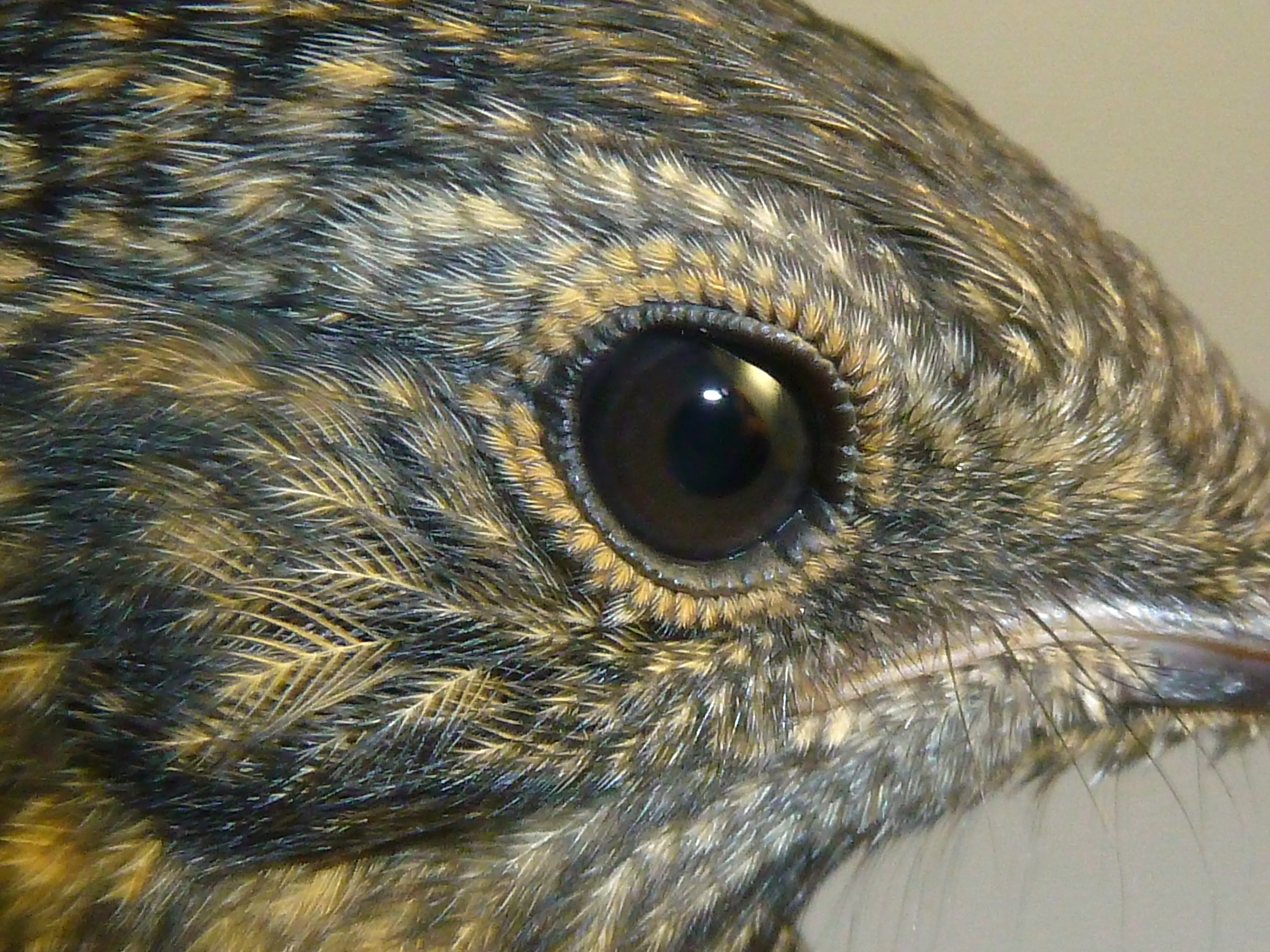
Robin-chat species, with a double ring of small feathers about the eye

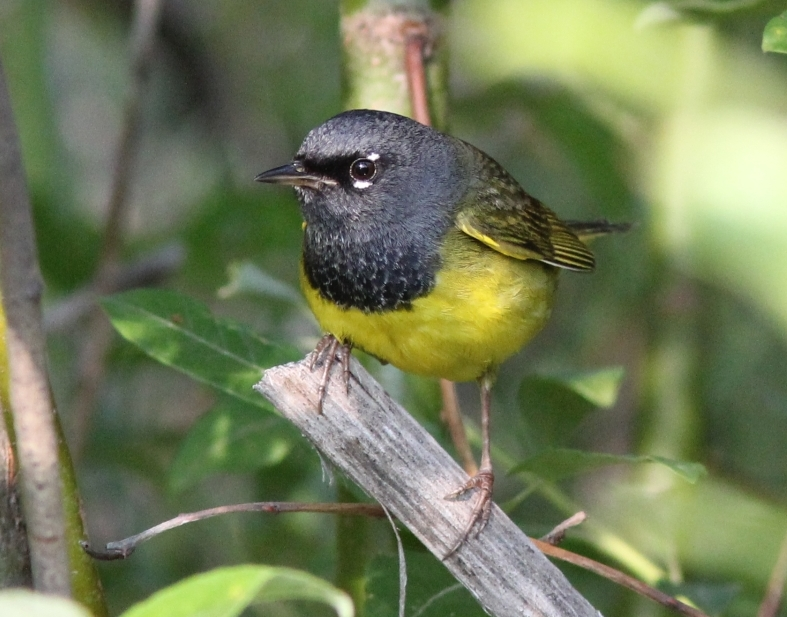
Eye arcs above and below the eye of a male MacGillivray's warbler

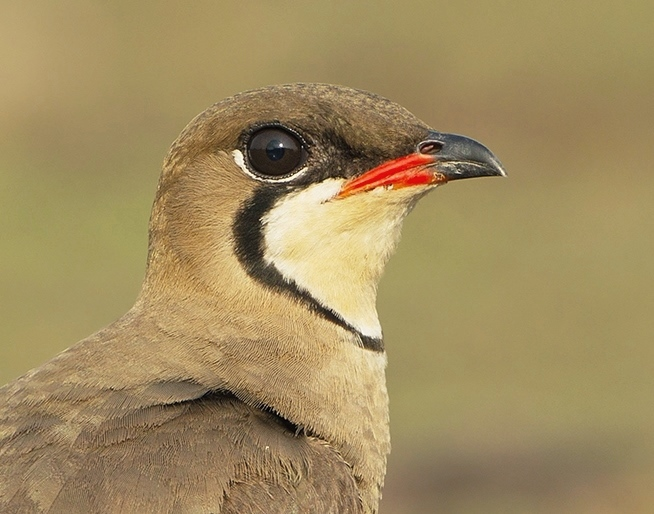
Pratincole with a complete dark orbital ring but partially contrasting white eye-ring

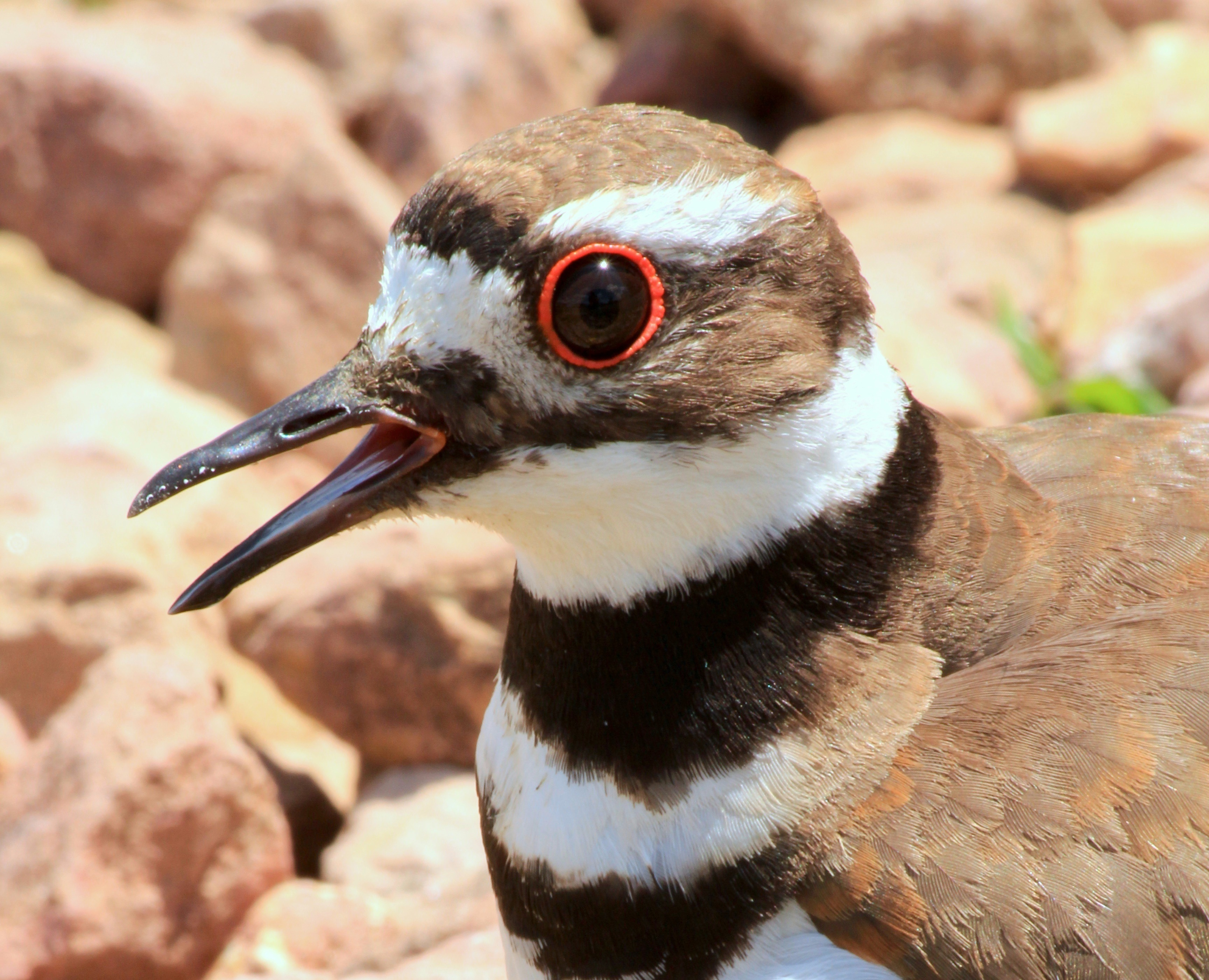
The killdeer, one of many waders with a conspicuous red orbital ring

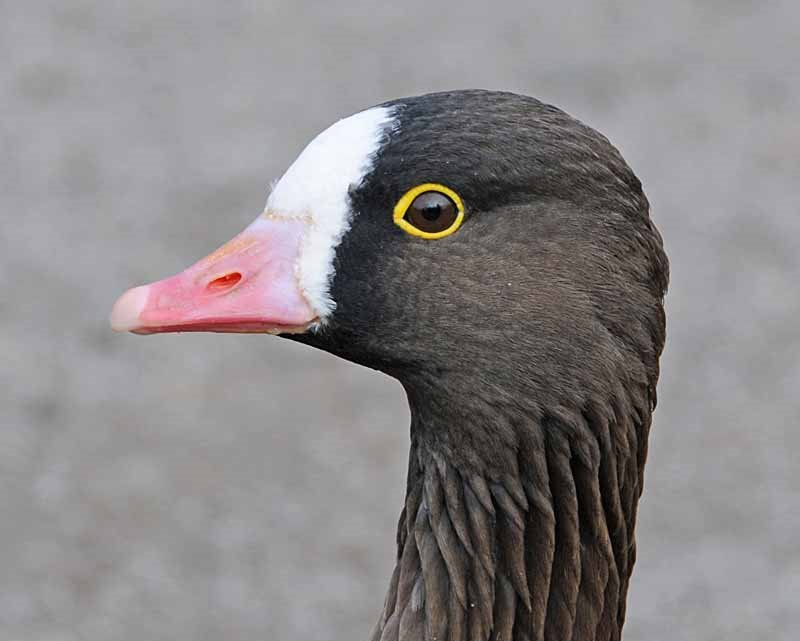
Bright yellow orbital ring in a lesser white-fronted goose

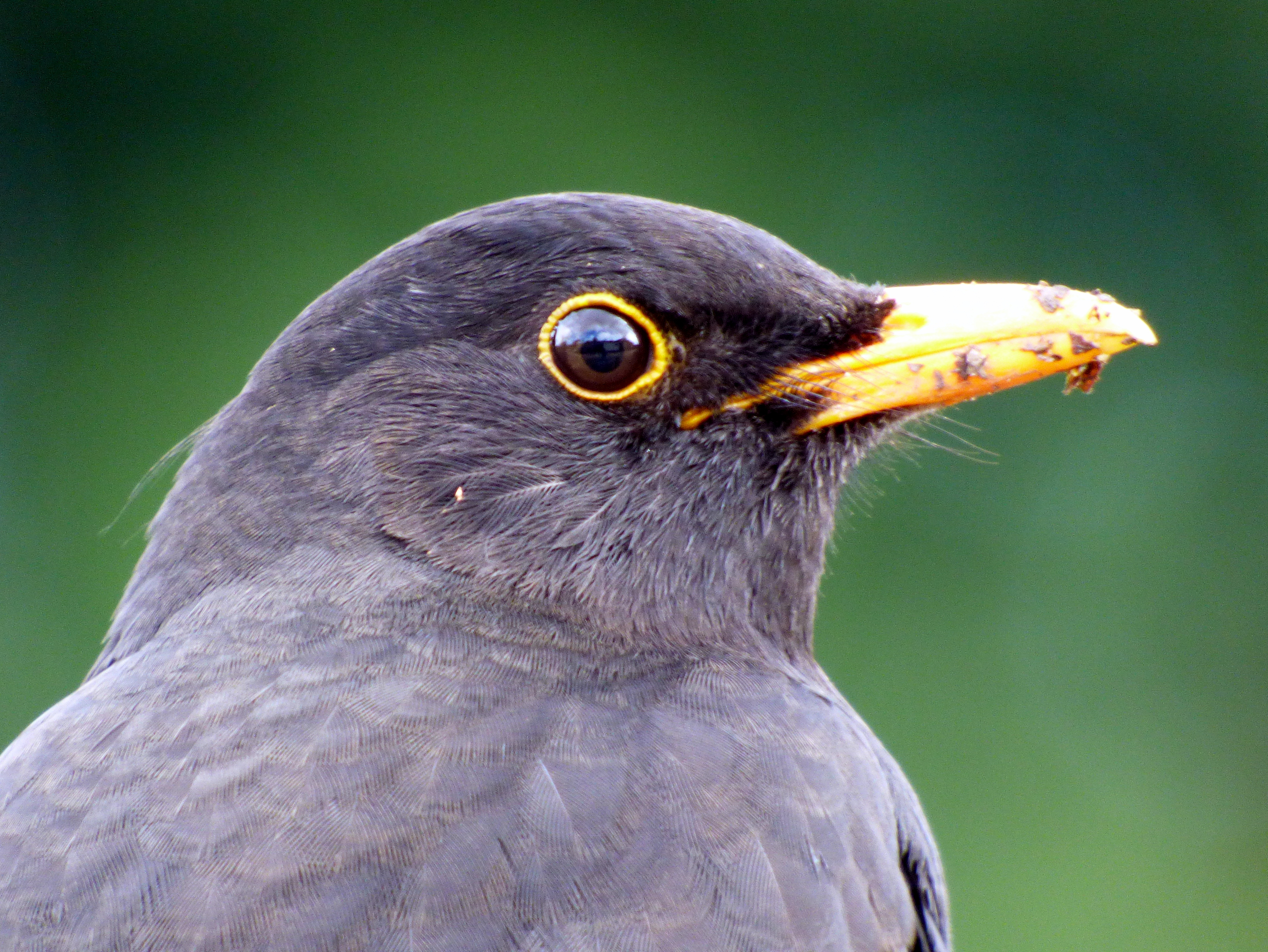
A male blackbird with distinct yellow orbital ring

== See also ==
- Glossary of bird terms
- Iris
- List of terms used in bird topography
- Scleral ring - a ring of overlapping bony plates within the eye
