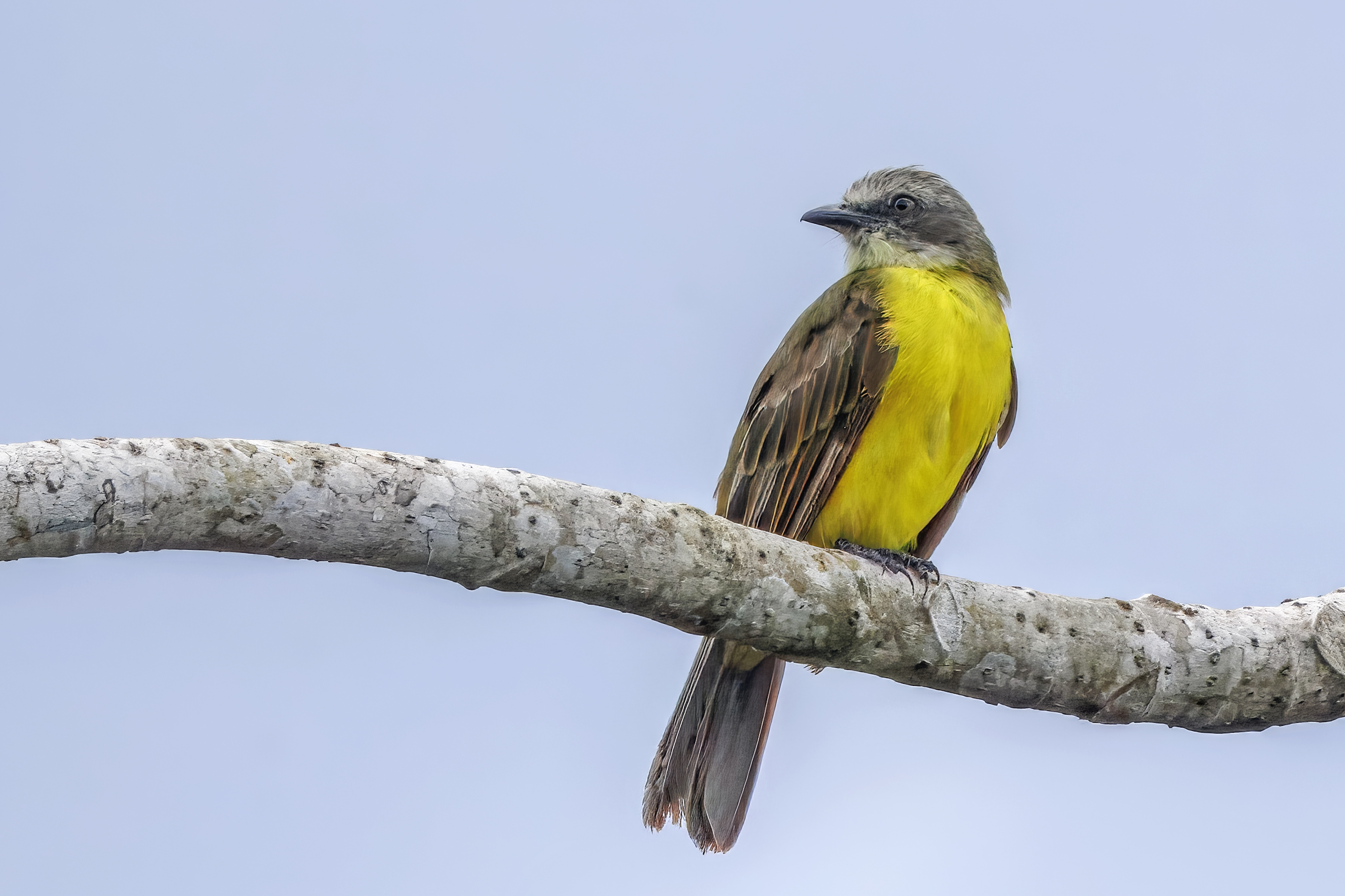

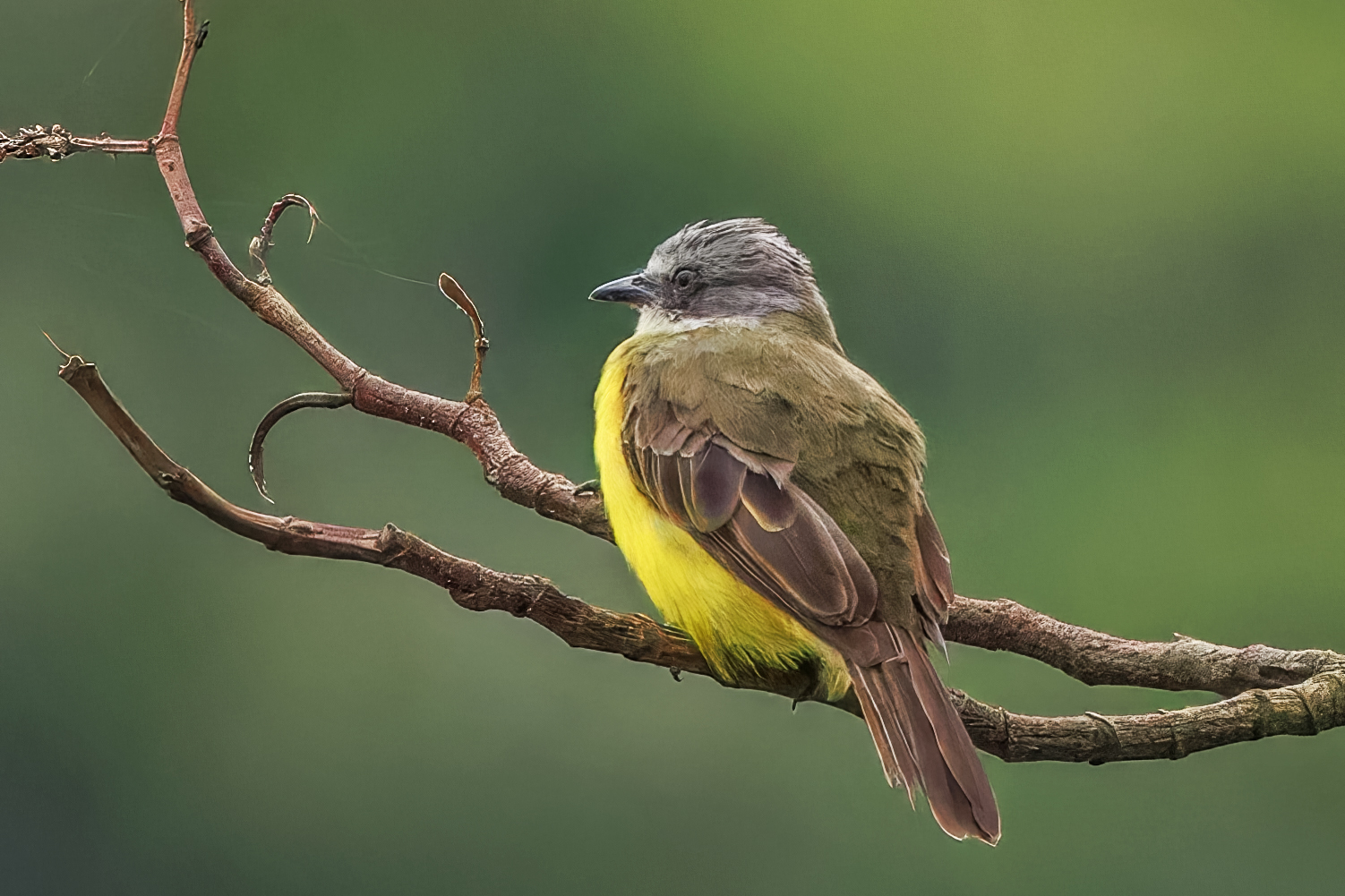
- Both M. g. obscurior, Ecuador

Conservation status
- Least Concern (IUCN 3.1)

Scientific classification
- Kingdom: Animalia
- Phylum: Chordata
- Class: Aves
- Order: Passeriformes
- Family: Tyrannidae
- Genus: Myiozetetes
- Species: M. granadensis

Binomial name
- Myiozetetes granadensis Lawrence, 1862

= Grey-capped flycatcher =

Species of bird

The grey-capped flycatcher (Myiozetetes granadensis) is a passerine bird, a member of the large tyrant flycatcher family Tyrannidae. It is found in Bolivia, Brazil, Colombia, Costa Rica, Ecuador, Honduras, Nicaragua, Panama, Peru, and Venezuela.

== Taxonomy and systematics ==
The grey-capped flycatcher has three subspecies, the nominate M. g. granadensis (Lawrence, 1862), M. g. occidentalis (Zimmer, JT, 1937), and M. g. obscurior (Todd, 1925). At least one author has suggested that M. g. occidentalis should be merged into the nominate.

== Description ==
The grey-capped flycatcher is 16 to 18 cm (6.3 to 7.1 in) long and weighs 28 to 30 g (0.99 to 1.1 oz). The sexes have almost the same plumage. Adult males of the nominate subspecies have a gray crown and nape with a mostly hidden orange-yellow to reddish orange patch in the center of the crown. Females sometimes have a smaller patch or none at all. Adults of both sexes have a white forehead that extends as a thin supercilium to just past the eye. They have dusky lores and ear coverts. Their upperparts are mostly olive-green with dusky to dark olive uppertail coverts that have paler edges. Their wings are dusky grayish brown with pale olive-green lesser coverts and olive edges on all the coverts. Their remiges are dusky grayish brown with light yellowish olive or cinnamon edges. Their tail is dusky grayish brown with pale olive edges on the feathers. Their chin and throat are white to yellowish white and their underparts are bright yellow with a slight olive tinge on the sides of the breast. Juveniles have a grayish olive tinge on the crown and nape and little or no orange on the crown. Compared to adults they have lighter tawny brown or cinnamon edges on the wing coverts, wider, more tawny, edges on the tail feathers, and slightly paler underparts. Subspecies M. g. occidentalis is slightly smaller than the nominate but otherwise the same. M. g. obscurior is larger and somewhat darker than the nominate. All subspecies have a pale brownish gray iris, a stubby black bill, and black legs and feet.

The grey-capped flycatcher is similar to its congener the social flycatcher (M. similis), which has a stronger black and white head pattern.

== Distribution and habitat ==
The grey-capped flycatcher has a disjunct distribution. The nominate subspecies is found on the Caribbean slope of eastern Honduras and Nicaragua south on the Caribbean and Pacific slopes through Costa Rica to central Panama. Subspecies M. g. occidentalis is found from Darién Province in eastern Panama and west of the Andes south through northern and western Colombia into northwestern Ecuador to northern Manabí Province. M. g. obscurior is found apart from the other two subspecies. It ranges from the lower Magdalena River valley in Colombia south through eastern Ecuador and eastern Peru into northern Bolivia and from the east side of Colombia's Eastern Andes into southeastern Venezuela's Amazonas and western Bolívar states and in western Brazil's northern Roraima, western Amazonas, and Rondônia states.

The grey-capped flycatcher inhabits a variety of humid landscapes in the tropical and lower subtropical zones, most of which are somewhat open. These include the edges and shrubby clearings of evergreen forest, secondary forest, gallery forest, and agricultural areas with scattered trees. It often occurs near areas of standing water. In elevation it ranges mostly from sea level to 1,650 m (5,400 ft) overall but reaches 1,800 m (5,900 ft) in Honduras. It reaches 1,500 m (4,900 ft) in Costa Rica, 1,000 m (3,300 ft) in Colombia and Ecuador, 1,400 m (4,600 ft) in Peru, only 550 m (1,800 ft) in Venezuela, and 1,100 m (3,600 ft) in Brazil.

== Behavior ==
=== Movement ===
The grey-capped flycatcher is assumed to be resident in most or all of its range.

=== Feeding ===
The grey-capped flycatcher feeds mostly on insects and also includes a significant amount of berries and seeds in its diet. It forages singly, in pairs, and in small family groups. Outside the breeding season large numbers may share a fruiting tree. It usually perches up to the forest's mid-level but sometimes in a treetop. It captures most insect prey in mid-air ("hawking ") and sometimes with sallies to foliage.

=== Breeding ===
The grey-capped flycatcher's breeding season has not been fully defined. It spans at least from February to June in Costa Rica, from February to May in Panama, and from September to January in Peru. It includes March in Colombia. Its nest is bulky domed cup or globe with a side entrance made from dry grass, straw, and weed stems. It typically is placed in a tree or bush between about 1.8 and 8 m (5 and 25 ft) above the ground but can be as high as 18 m (60 ft) up. The clutch is usually two or three eggs but clutches of four are known. The incubation period, time to fledging, and details of parental care are not known.

=== Vocalization ===
The grey-capped flycatcher's vocalizations appear to vary somewhat across its range. In Ecuador west of the Andes its dawn song is a "kip, ki[p, kip, keeuw-kreh" that lasts about two or three seconds. East of the Andes it sings "a faster kip, kip, kip, kip, kip, kip, ke-ke-kree-yí" that lasts one or two seconds. Its Central American song is written as a "high djup-djup sréeeh". It has a variety of calls including "repeated nasal kip, bip or wic notes and longer kip-kee-kew or kip-kip-kip-it series" and "harsh, strident, aggressive-sounding staccato notes, kurr keer ch'beer, k'keer keer jeer k'beer" when confronting others of its species.

== Status ==
The IUCN has assessed the grey-capped flycatcher as being of Least Concern. It has a very large range and its estimated population of at least five million mature individuals is believed to be stable. No immediate threats have been identified. It is considered uncommon to common in Honduras, common in the Costa Rican lowlands and less so in the highlands, common in Colombia, Ecuador, and Peru, and local in Venezuela. It "thrives in secondary habitats and in agricultural and residential areas, and occurs in several national parks and other protected areas throughout its range".
