= Social flycatcher =

- In Tulum, Mexico.

Conservation status
- Least Concern (IUCN 3.1)

Scientific classification
- Kingdom: Animalia
- Phylum: Chordata
- Class: Aves
- Order: Passeriformes
- Family: Tyrannidae
- Genus: Myiozetetes
- Species: M. similis

Binomial name
- Myiozetetes similis (Spix, 1825)

Synonyms
- Muscicapa similis (protonym)

Species of bird

The social flycatcher (Myiozetetes similis) is a passerine bird from the Americas, a member of the large tyrant flycatcher family Tyrannidae. It is found in Mexico, every Central American country, and every mainland South American country except Chile, Guyana, Suriname, and Uruguay. It has also occurred as a vagrant in the United States.

== Taxonomy and systematics ==
The social flycatcher was originally described in 1825 as Muscicapa similis, mistakenly placing it in the Old World flycatcher family.

The social flycatcher has these seven subspecies:

- M. s. primulus Van Rossem, 1930
- M. s. hesperis Phillips, AR, 1966
- M. s. texensis (Jacob Post Giraud Jr, 1841)
- M. s. columbianus Cabanis & Heine, 1860
- M. s. similis (Spix, 1825)
- M. s. grandis Lawrence, 1871
- M. s. pallidiventris Pinto, 1935

In the early twentieth century some authors treated M. s. texensis as a separate species. By itself and also with M. s. primulus and M. s. hesperis it was called the vermilion-crowned flycatcher. (At least one author used "vermilion-crowned" for the entire social flycatcher.) A 2023 field guide treats each of M. s. texensis, M. s. columbianus, M. s. grandis, and M. s. pallidiventris as separate species. Within the full species the Clements taxonomy groups M. s. primulus, M. s. hesperis, and M. s. texensis as the "social flycatcher (vermilion-crowned)", groups M. s. similis, M. s. columbianus, and M. s. pallidiventris as the "social flycatcher (social)", and calls M. s. grandis the "social flycatcher (Tumbes)".

The social flycatcher's specific epithet similis is from the Latin similis or simile meaning "similar" or "resembling". The species closely resembles several other flycatchers including the congeneric rusty-margined flycatcher (M. cayanensis), the great and lesser kiskadees (Pitangus sulphuratus and Philodor lictor), and the three-striped flycatcher (Conopias trivirgatus).

== Description ==
The social flycatcher is 16 to 18.5 cm (6.3 to 7.3 in) long and weighs 24 to 27 g (0.85 to 0.95 oz). The sexes have the same plumage, though females average slightly smaller than males. Adults of the nominate subspecies M. s. similis have a dark gray to brownish gray head with a mostly hidden bright red to orangish red patch in the center of the crown. They have a wide white supercilium that begins on the forehead and extends far past the eye. Their upperparts are mostly dull olive-green to brownish olive with a somewhat more grayish olive hindneck and grayish brown or grayish olive uppertail coverts. Their wings are deep grayish brown with pale grayish white edges on the inner secondaries and pale olivaceous edges on the rest of the flight feathers. Their wing coverts are olive to brownish olive with grayish white edges that sometimes show as two faint wing bars. Their tail is deep grayish brown with pale olive edges on the feathers. Their chin and throat are white to yellowish white and their underparts are bright yellow. Juveniles are similar to adults but with little or no red on the crown and wider rufous edges on the wing and tail feathers.

The other subspecies of the social flycatcher are much like the nominate, mostly differing slightly in the tone of the crown patch and edges of the wing feathers. In addition, M. s. grandis is larger than the nominate with wider and paler edges on the wing coverts and slightly brighter underparts. M. s. columbianus is the smallest subspecies; its crown is lighter gray than the nominate's with paler edges on the wing coverts and brighter and deeper yellow underparts. All subspecies have a brown iris, a stubby black bill, and black legs and feet.

== Distribution and habitat ==
The subspecies of the social flycatcher are found thus:

- M. s. primulus: western Mexico from southern Sonora south to northern Sinaloa
- M. s. hesperis: western Mexico from central Sinaloa and southern Zacatecas east to southwestern Puebla and south to southeastern Oaxaca and perhaps beyond
- M. s. texensis: from southwestern Tamaulipas in eastern Mexico south through Belize, Guatemala, El Salvador, Honduras, and Nicaragua into most of Costa Rica
- M. s. columbianus: from southwestern Costa Rica south through Panama into northern Colombia and northern Venezuela; in Colombia coastal and south through the Magdalena River valley to Huila Department and in Venezuela east to Sucre and south to northern Amazonas and northern Bolívar states
- M. s. similis: from Colombia east of the Eastern Andes across Amazonas and southern Bolívar in Venezuela into French Guiana and south through eastern Ecuador, northeastern and eastern Peru, much of Amazonian Brazil, and northern Bolivia
- M. s. grandis: from western Esmeraldas Province in western Ecuador south slightly into far northwestern Peru's Tumbes Department
- M. s. pallidiventris: eastern Brazil roughly bounded by eastern Pará, Paraíba, northern Rio Grande do Sul, and Mato Grosso do Sul continuing into eastern Paraguay and northeastern Argentina's Misiones Province

The species has also occurred as a vagrant in the United States with at least one record in Texas.

The social flycatcher inhabits a variety of moist to semi-arid landscapes in the tropical and lower subtropical zones, most of which are somewhat open. These include lowlands with scattered bushes and trees; secondary forest; the canopy, edges, and shrubby openings in primary forest and woodlands; the margins of lakes and rivers such as gallery forest; agricultural and pasture lands' and gardens and parks in residential areas. In elevation it ranges from sea level mostly to about 1,850 m (6,100 ft) in Mexico and Central America but reaches 2,250 m (7,400 ft) in Costa Rica. It ranges up to 1,400 m (4,600 ft) in Colombia, to 1,500 m (4,900 ft) north of the Orinoco River and to 500 m (1,600 ft) south of it in Venezuela, to 1,400 m (4,600 ft) in Ecuador, to 1,800 m (5,900 ft) in Peru, and to 1,000 m (3,300 ft) and occasionally higher in Brazil.

== Behavior ==
=== Movement ===
The social flycatcher is a year-round resident in most of its range though its movements in some areas are poorly understood. The populations in Argentina and southernmost Brazil appear to move north for the austral winter. In western Venezuela it occurs in the Llanos only in the dry season of June to October. It also appears to be partially or fully migratory in eastern and southern Venezuela.

=== Feeding ===
The social flycatcher feeds mostly on insects and also includes a significant amount of berries, fruits, and seeds in its diet. There are records of feeding on tadpoles. It most often forages in pairs and, for a time after the breeding season, in family groups. Outside the breeding season large numbers may share a fruiting tree. It rarely joins mixed-species feeding flocks. It perches in the open on a treetop or on the edge of vegetation at all levels from near the ground to the canopy of trees but most often at middle levels. It takes prey with sallies from the perch to the ground or vegetation and also takes it in mid-air by hawking. It takes fruit while perched or while briefly hovering.

The social flycatcher has been observed foraging peacefully near common marmosets (Callithrix jacchus) in the undergrowth, maybe even cooperating with the monkeys in flushing prey from hiding. Perhaps this behavior only occurs during the dry season, when fruits are scarce.

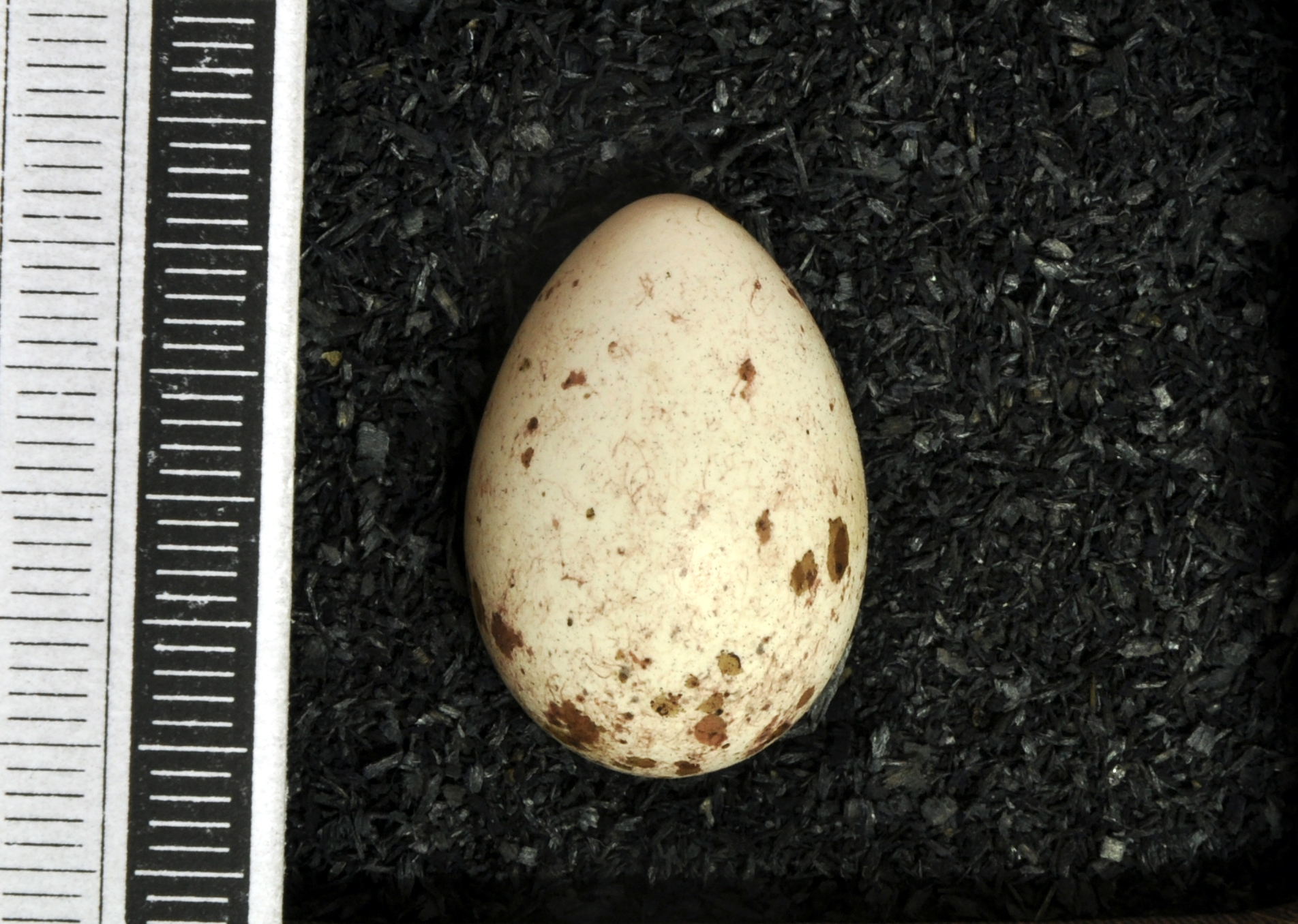
Egg, collection Museum Wiesbaden

=== Breeding ===
The social flycatcher's breeding season varies geographically and often tends to be very long. It spans February to June in Costa Rica, at least January to April in Colombia, May to July in Venezuela, and August to January in Peru. It includes March and April in Panama and October and November in Argentina. Its nest is a bulky domed cup made from grass, straw, and twigs, and often includes cotton, paper, and other human-made fibers. The female alone builds the nest. It often is built in a highly visible site, most often on a branch fork between a tree's mid-level and its canopy or in a thorny bush. Nests have also been found on human structures, over water, and atop the old nest of another species. It often nests near nests of bees or wasps and also often in the same bush or tree as other flycatcher species. The clutch is two to four eggs that the female alone incubates. The incubation period is 15 to 16 days and fledging occurs 17 to 21 days after hatch. Usually a pair raise a single brood but may renest repeatedly if nests are lost to predation.

=== Vocalization ===
What is thought to be the social flycatcher's dawn song is a "shrill note repeated several times, sometimes followed by [a] longer and continuously repeated series, seeu, seeu, see-u-chú, sree, sree, sree si-si-chuhr, or [a] shorter but still repeated chirrrr". It also makes "a shrill and piercing seeá, tcheiit or see-yh! scream; also various nasal or somewhat shrill, rapid twittering and bickering phrases, as t-cheer-cheer-che-tiqueer or chiir t-chiir t-chirr". East of the Andes in Ecuador the nominate subspecies also makes "a chattered ti-ti-ti-tíchew, chew" and west of the range M. s. grandis makes "a chattered kree-kree-kree".

== Status ==
The IUCN has assessed the social flycatcher as being of Least Concern. It has an extremely large range and its estimated population of at least fifty million mature individuals is believed to be stable. No immediate threats have been identified. It is considered common to very common in most of its range. It "[t]hrives in variety of semi-open habitats, including those that have been converted and those in agricultural and residential areas [and] occurs in numerous protected areas".

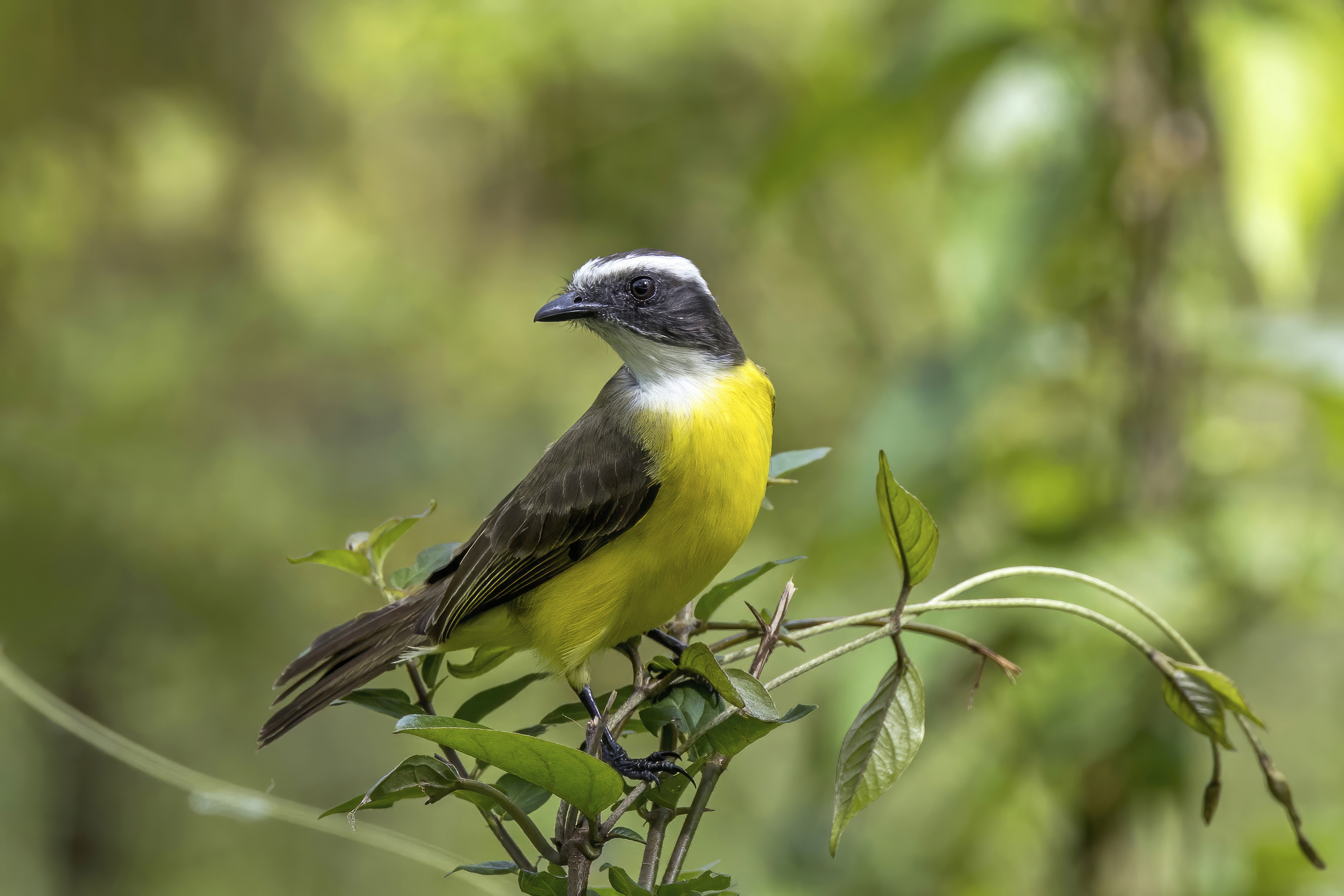
M. s. texensis
Petén, Guatemala

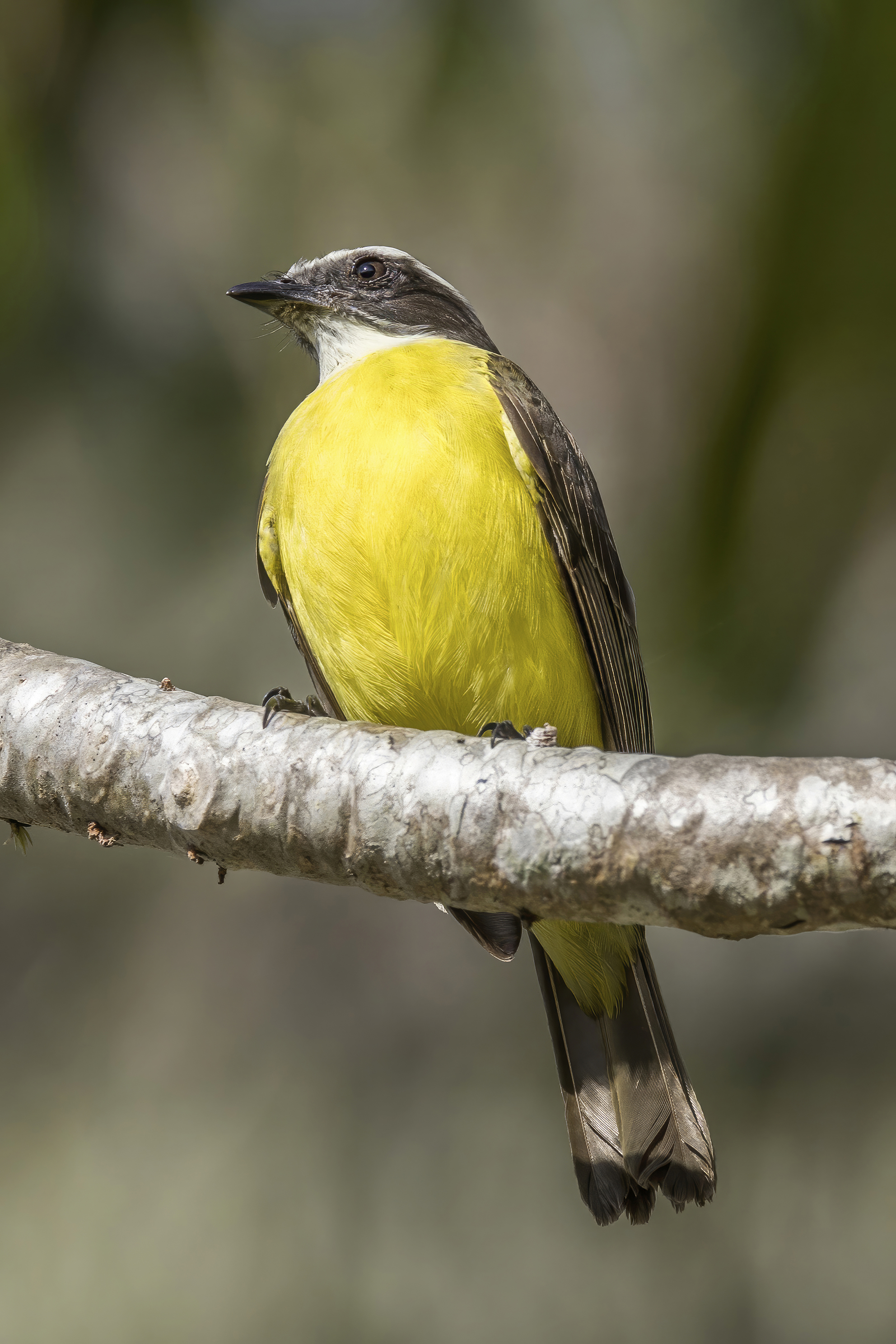
M. s. texensis
Belize

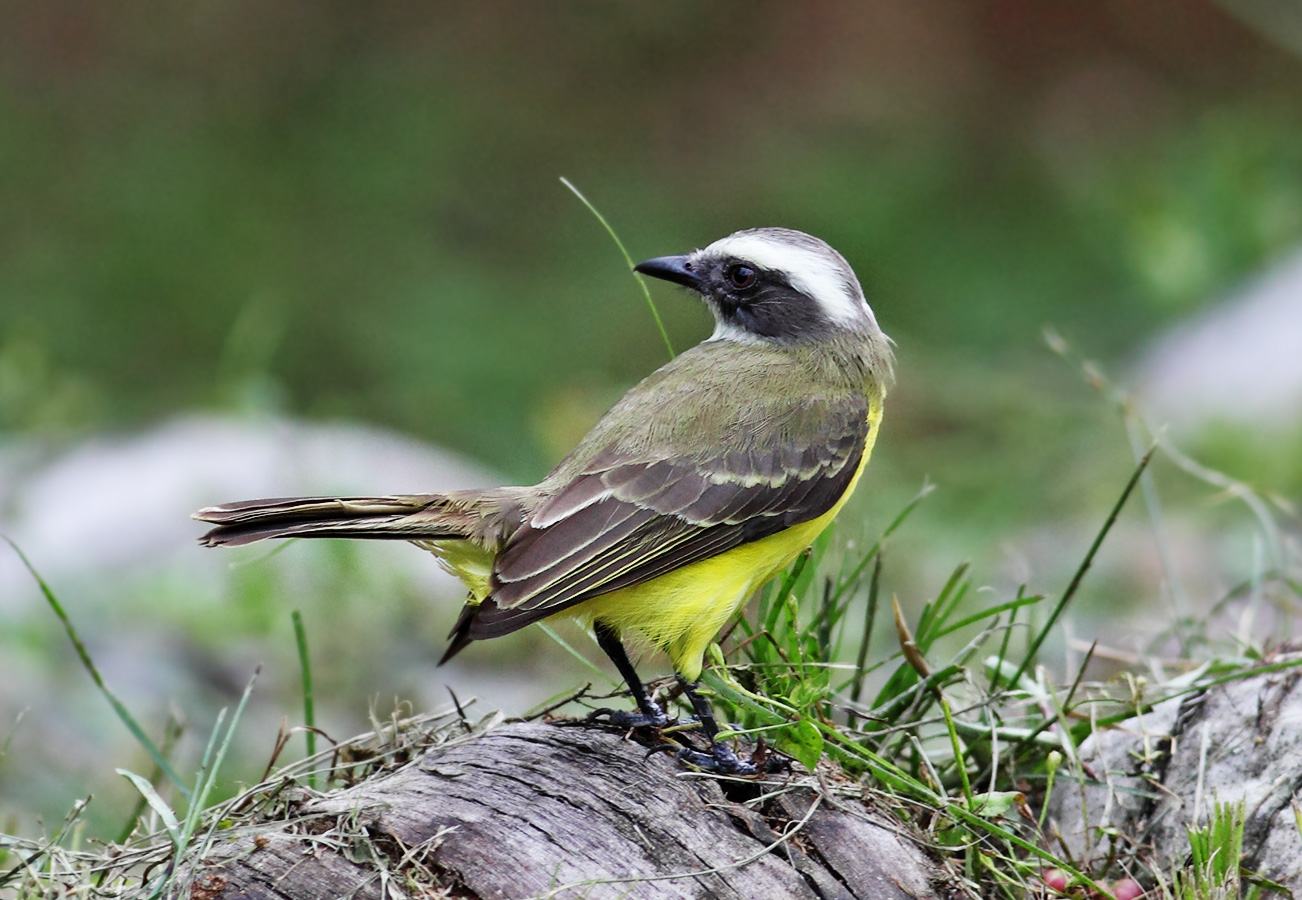
M. s. columbianus
Corcovado, Costa Rica

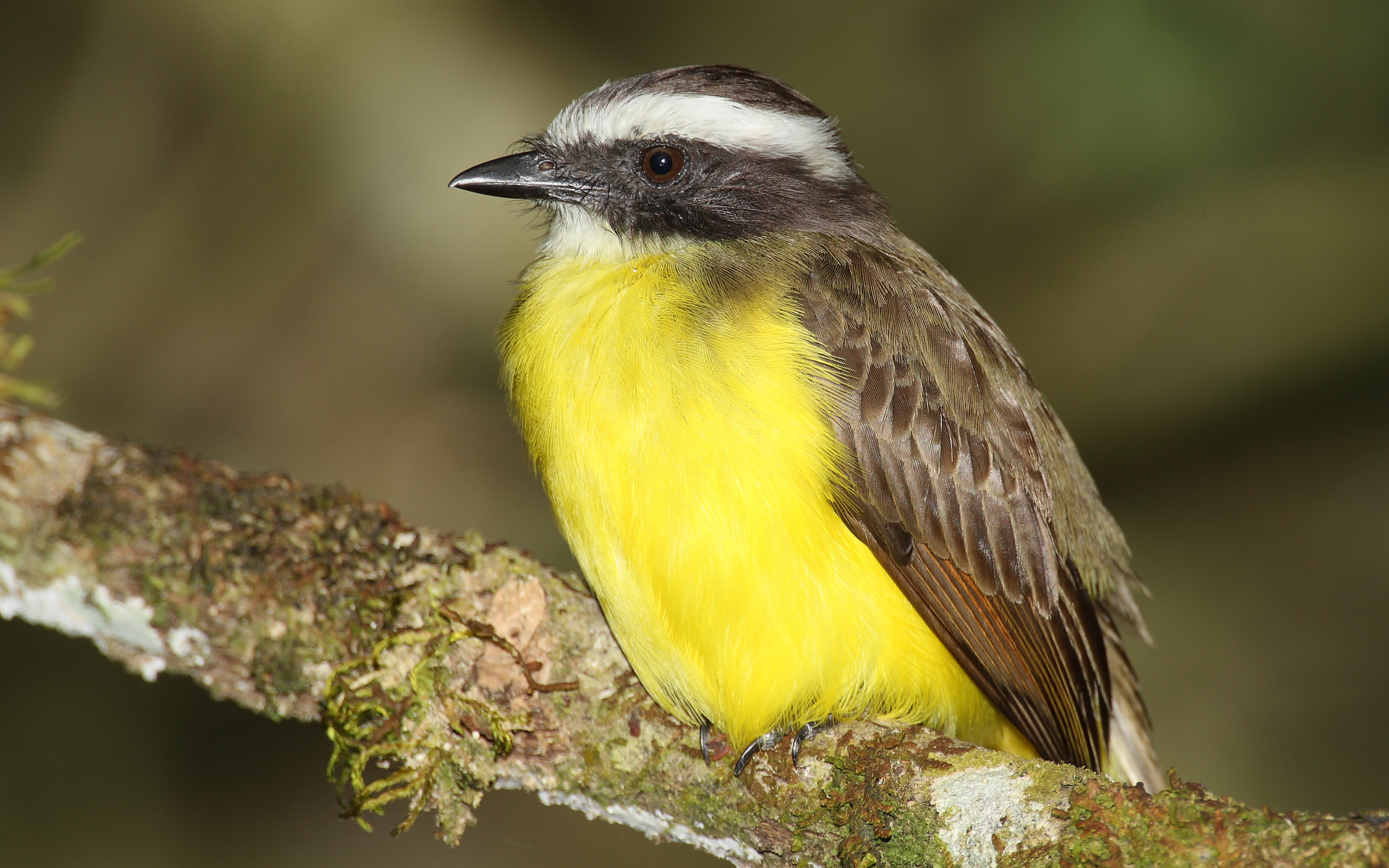
M. s. columbianus
Darién National Park, Panama

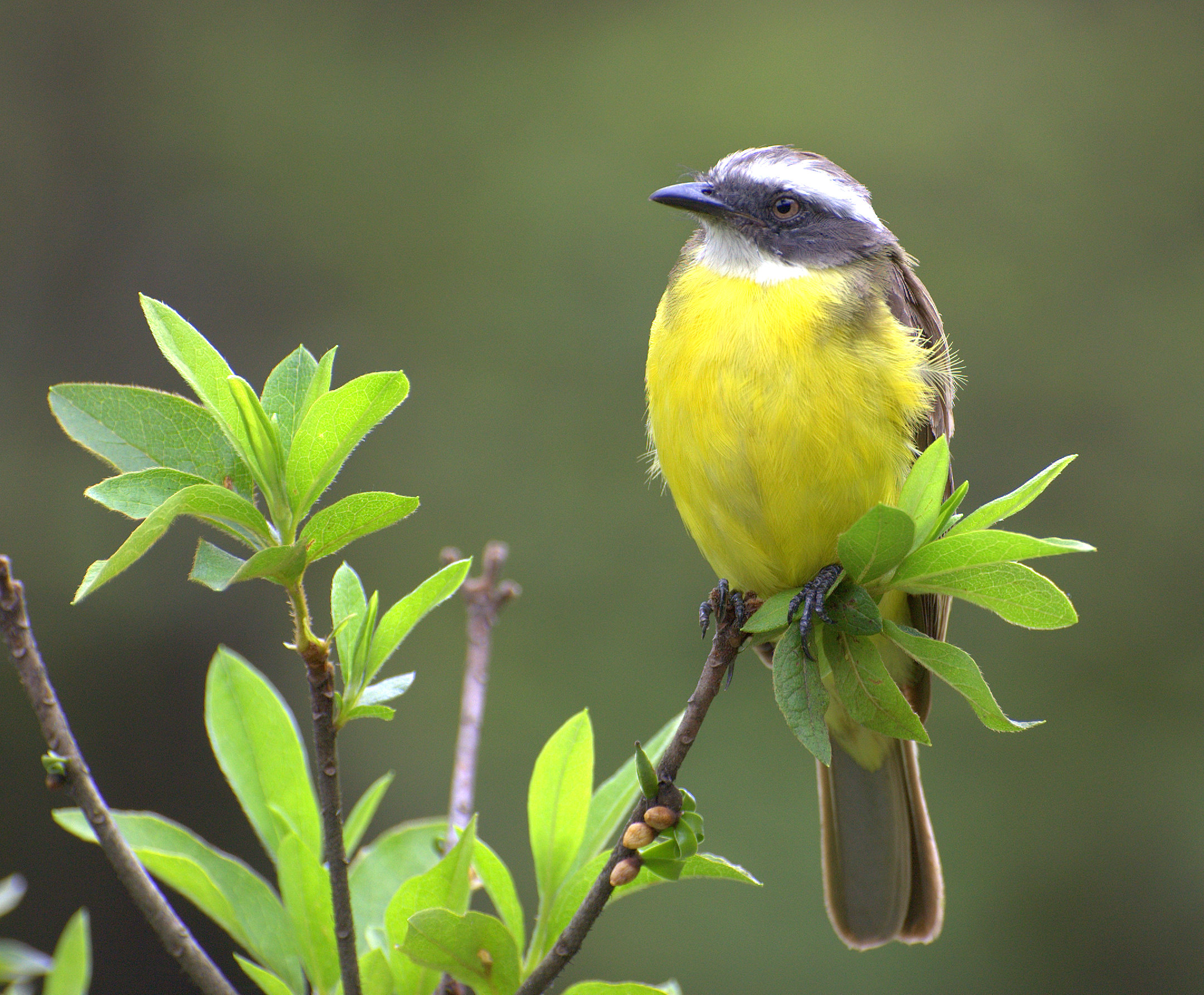
M. s. pallidiventris
Brazil

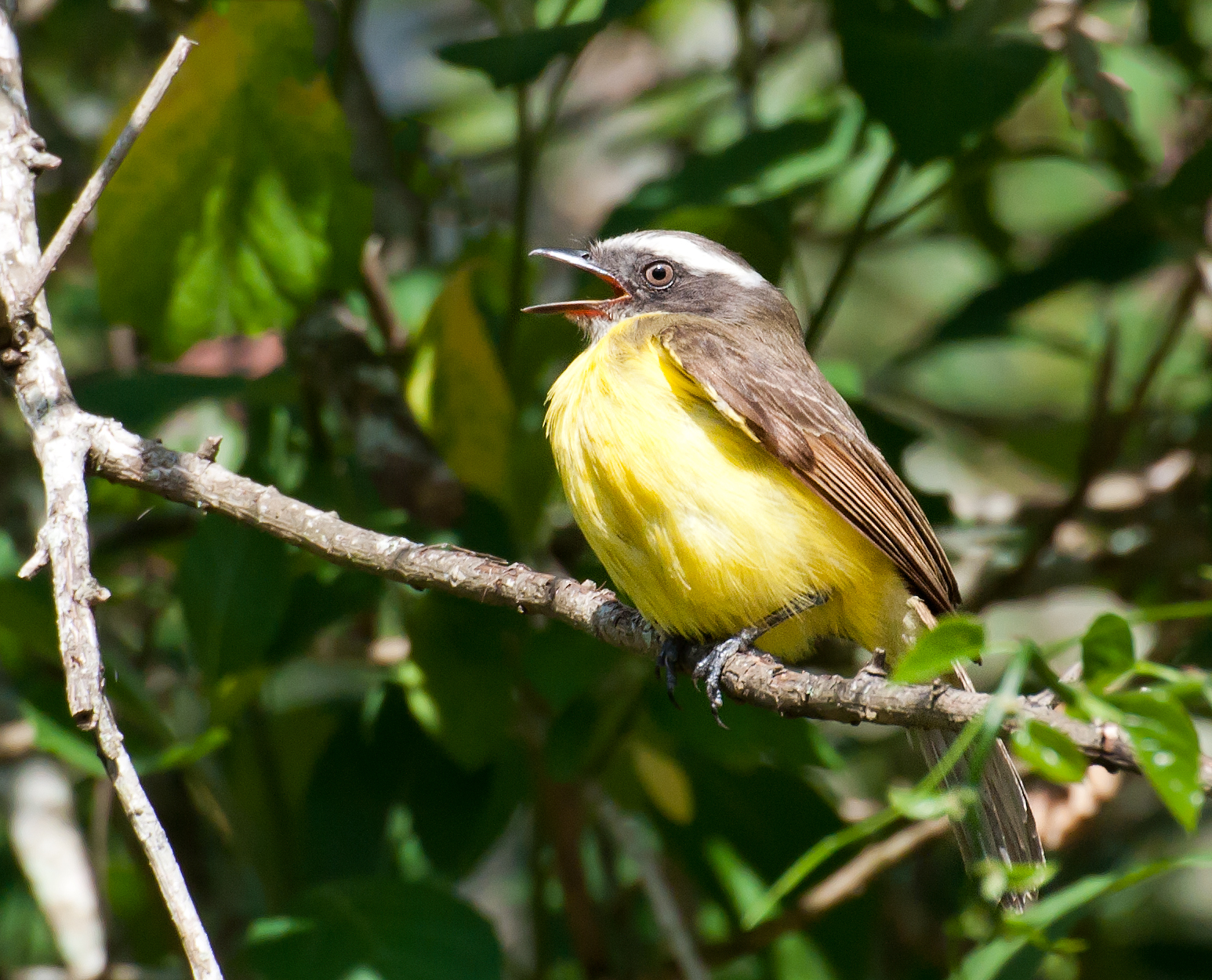
M. s. pallidiventris
São Paulo, Brazil
