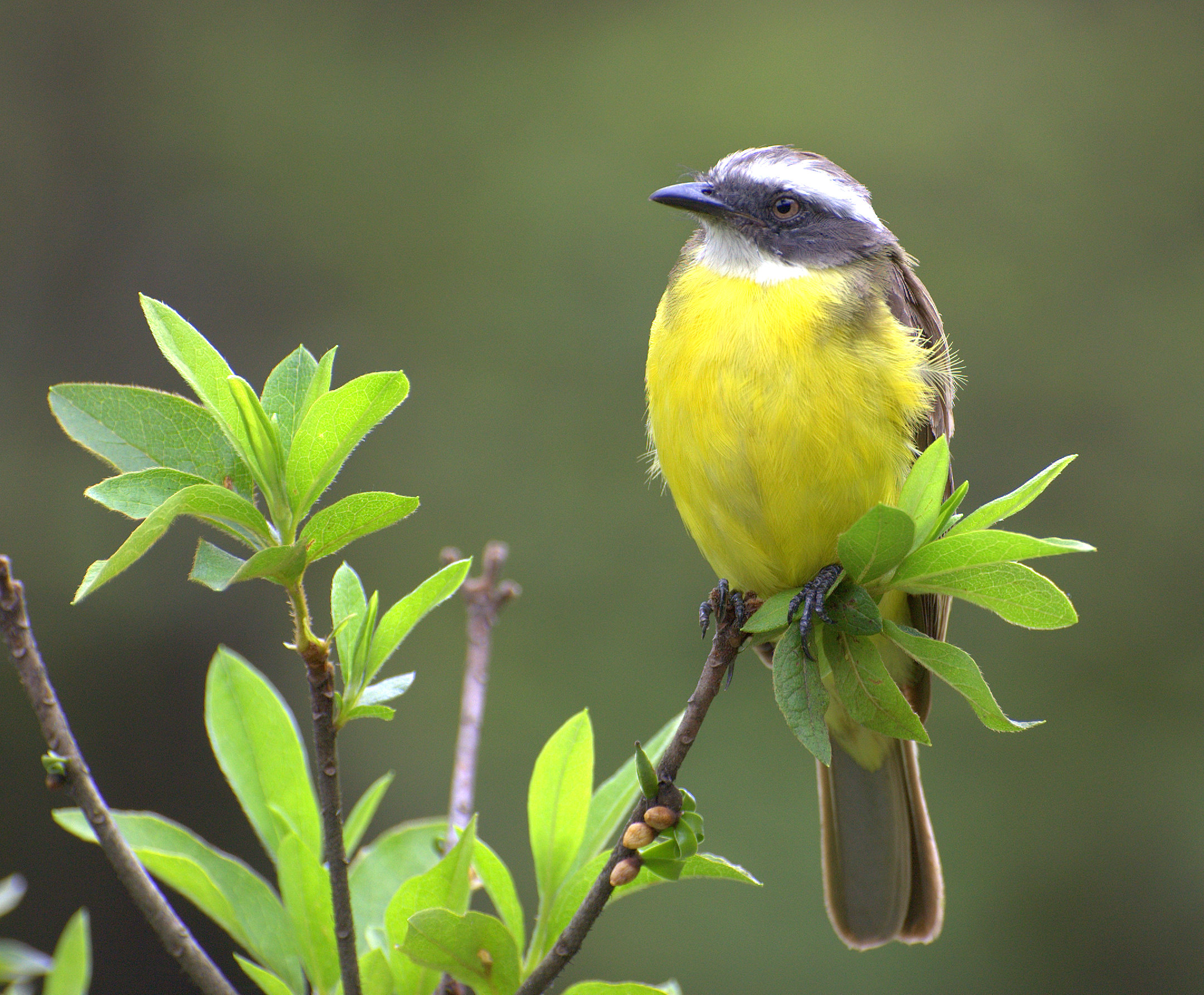
- Social flycatcher (Myiozetetes similis)

Scientific classification
- Kingdom: Animalia
- Phylum: Chordata
- Class: Aves
- Order: Passeriformes
- Family: Tyrannidae
- Genus: Myiozetetes; P.L. Sclater, 1859

Type species
- Muscicapa cayanensis Linnaeus, 1766

Species
- see text

= Myiozetetes =

Genus of birds

Myiozetetes is a small genus of passerine birds in the tyrant flycatcher family. The four species occur in tropical Central and South America.

== Taxonomy ==
The genus Myiozetetes was introduced by the English zoologist Philip Sclater in 1859 with the rusty-margined flycatcher as the type species. The name of the genus combines the Ancient Greek muias "fly" and zētētēs "searcher".

=== Species ===
The genus contains four species:

Image	Scientific name	Common name	Distribution
	Myiozetetes cayanensis	Rusty-margined flycatcher	Bolivia, Brazil, Colombia, Ecuador, French Guiana, Guyana, Peru, Suriname, and Venezuela; also eastern Panama.
	Myiozetetes similis	Social flycatcher	from northwestern Mexico south to northeastern Peru, southern Brazil and northwestern Argentina
	Myiozetetes granadensis	Grey-capped flycatcher	eastern Honduras south to northwestern Peru, northern Bolivia and western Brazil
	Myiozetetes luteiventris	Dusky-chested flycatcher	Bolivia, Brazil, Colombia, Ecuador, French Guiana, Peru, Suriname, and Venezuela

== Description ==
The adult Myiozetetes flycatcher is 16–18 cm (6.3–7.1 in) long and weighs 24–30 g (0.85–1.06 oz). The upperparts are olive-brown, and the wings and tail are brown with only faint rufous fringes. The underparts are yellow and the throat is white. Young birds lack the red-orange crown stripe of the adult, and have chestnut fringes to the wing and tail feathers. The best distinction between the species is the head pattern: Vermilion-crowned, social and rusty-margined flycatchers have strong black-and white head markings like the great kiskadee, whereas grey-capped and dusky-chested flycatchers have greyish heads, with a short weak eyestripe in the former.

Myiozetetes flycatchers sally out from an open perch in a tree to catch insects in flight. They sometimes hover to take small berries. They breed in cultivation, pasture, and open woodland with some trees, building a large roofed nest from stems and in a bush, tree or on a building. The nest is often constructed near a wasp, bee or ant nest, or the nest of another tyrant flycatcher. The nest site is often near or over water. The typical clutch is two to four brown or lilac-blotched cream or white eggs, laid between February and June.
