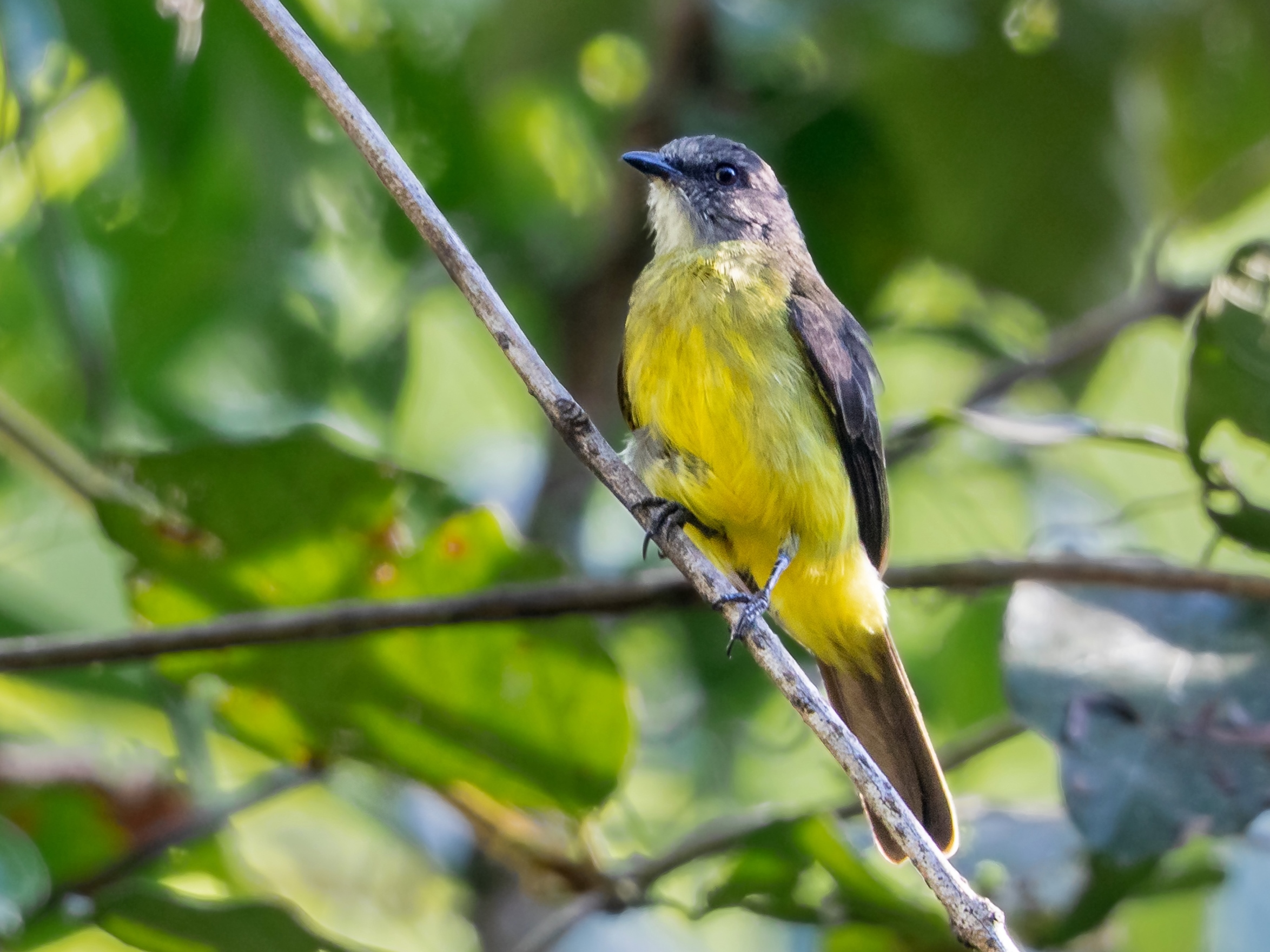
- Myiozetetes luteiventris - Dusky-chested Flycatcher (song)

Conservation status
- Least Concern (IUCN 3.1)

Scientific classification
- Kingdom: Animalia
- Phylum: Chordata
- Class: Aves
- Order: Passeriformes
- Family: Tyrannidae
- Genus: Myiozetetes
- Species: M. luteiventris

Binomial name
- Myiozetetes luteiventris (Sclater, PL, 1858)

= Dusky-chested flycatcher =

Species of bird

The dusky-chested flycatcher (Myiozetetes luteiventris) is a species of bird in the family Tyrannidae, the tyrant flycatchers. It is found in Bolivia, Brazil, Colombia, Ecuador, French Guiana, Guyana, Peru, Suriname, and Venezuela.

== Taxonomy and systematics ==
The dusky-chested flycatcher was originally described as Elaenia luteiventris. It was later moved to genus Myiozetetes but during the twentieth century was treated by some authors in genus Tyrannopsis. By the late 1900s it was again generally recognized in its present genus.

The dusky-chested flycatcher has two subspecies, the nominate M. l. luteiventris (Sclater, PL, 1858) and M. l. septentrionalis (Blake, 1961).

== Description ==
The dusky-chested flycatcher is the smallest member of genus Myiozetetes. It is 14 to 15 cm (5.5 to 5.9 in) long and weighs about 16.5 g (0.58 oz). The sexes have almost the same plumage. Adult males of the nominate subspecies have a grayish olive-brown crown and face with a mostly hidden yellow-orange patch in the center of the crown. Females have a smaller patch or none at all. Adults of both sexes have dark olive-brown upperparts. Their wings are dark olive-brown with faint and variable rufous edges on the flight feathers. Their throat is whitish with faint dusky streaks. Their underparts are bright yellow with an olive cast and smudgy dark olive streaks on the upper breast. Subspecies M. l. septentrionalis has essentially the same plumage with sometimes greener edges on the flight feathers. Both subspecies have a black iris, a stubby black bill, and black legs and feet.

== Distribution and habitat ==
The dusky-chested flycatcher has a disjunct distribution within the Amazon Basin. The nominate subspecies has by far the larger range. It is found from the southeastern quadrant of Colombia south through eastern Ecuador and eastern Peru into far northwestern Bolivia and east into southern Venezuela's Amazonas and northern Bolívar states and across Brazil's central Amazon basin to western Maranhão. Subspecies M. l. septentrionalis is found across Guyana, Suriname, French Guiana, and northern Brazil's Amapá state. The species inhabits the canopy of evergreen forest both terra firme and várzea; shrubby forest edges, clearings, and openings caused by fallen trees; and the edges of rivers and lakes. In elevation it reaches 500 m (1,600 ft) in Colombia, 600 m (2,000 ft) in Ecuador, 1,000 m (3,300 ft) in Peru, 350 m (1,100 ft) in Venezuela, and 600 m (2,000 ft) in Brazil.

== Behavior ==
=== Movement ===
The dusky-chested flycatcher appears to "wander rather widely" and might be a partial migrant.

=== Feeding ===
The dusky-chested flycatcher feeds on insects and small fruits. It usually forages in pairs or small family groups though sometimes singly. It perches erect on an exposed branch as high as 20 m (65 ft) above the ground. It takes insect prey with short flights to glean or hover-glean it from foliage and only occasionally takes it in mid-air by hawking. It takes fruit also by gleaning from a perch or during a brief hover, but usually at a much lower height. It often feeds with other species in fruiting trees but seldom joins traveling mixed-species feeding flocks.

=== Breeding ===
The dusky-chested flycatcher's breeding season has not been determined but includes May in Colombia. Its one known nest was a bulky domed cup with a side entrance, made from grass, and placed about 1 m (3 ft) below the top of a tall tree on the edge of the forest. Nothing else is known about the species' breeding biology.

=== Vocalization ===
The dusky-chested flycatcher's most common call is "a nasal, cat-like meeow or softer neea". It makes a "fast nasal nyeeuw-nyeeuw, keep-kít or neea-ne-wít" when it is excited; sometimes pairs do this in duet. It also makes simple, often repeated, "keeuw or nyeeuw" calls.

== Status ==
The IUCN has assessed the dusky-chested flycatcher as being of Least Concern. It has a large range; its population size is not known and is believed to be stable. No immediate threats have been identified. It is considered uncommon in Colombia, "scarce" in Ecuador, uncommon in Peru, "uncommon and local" in Venezuela, and from "uncommon to frequent" in Brazil. It occurs in several national parks and other protected areas, and "most of its habitat is still in reasonably pristine condition".
