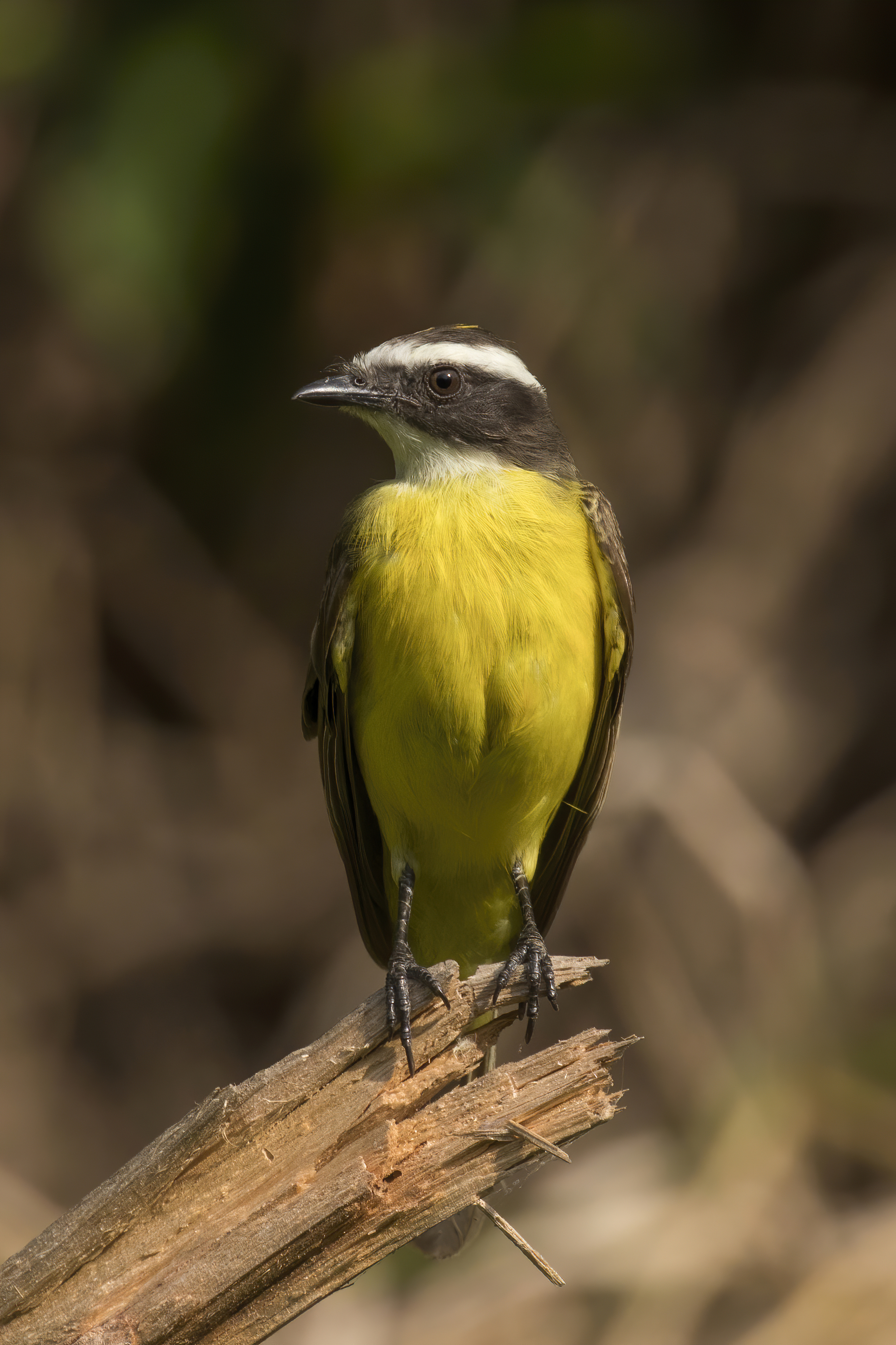
- M. c. cayanensis Chagres River, Panama

Conservation status
- Least Concern (IUCN 3.1)

Scientific classification
- Kingdom: Animalia
- Phylum: Chordata
- Class: Aves
- Order: Passeriformes
- Family: Tyrannidae
- Genus: Myiozetetes
- Species: M. cayanensis

Binomial name
- Myiozetetes cayanensis (Linnaeus, 1766)

Synonyms
- Muscicapa cayanensis

= Rusty-margined flycatcher =

Species of bird

The rusty-margined flycatcher (Myiozetetes cayanensis) is a species of bird in the family Tyrannidae, the tyrant flycatchers. It is found in Panama and every mainland South American country except Chile and Uruguay, though only as a vagrant to Argentina. It has also been recorded as a vagrant in Costa Rica.

== Taxonomy ==
In 1760 the French zoologist Mathurin Jacques Brisson included a description of the rusty-margined flycatcher in his Ornithologie based on a specimen collected in Cayenne in French Guiana. He used the French name Le gobe-mouche de Cayenne and the Latin Muscicapa Cayanensis. Although Brisson coined Latin names, these do not conform to the binomial system and are not recognized by the International Commission on Zoological Nomenclature. When in 1766 the Swedish naturalist Carl Linnaeus updated his Systema Naturae for the twelfth edition, he added the rusty-margined flycatcher among the 240 species that had been previously described by Brisson. Linnaeus included a brief description, used Brisson's Latin name as the binomial name Muscicapa cayanensis, and cited Brisson's work. This species is now placed in the genus Myiozetetes that was erected by the English zoologist Philip Sclater in 1859.

The rusty-margined flycatcher has these four subspecies:

- M. c. rufipennis Lawrence, 1869
- M. c. hellmayri Hartert, EJO & Goodson, 1917
- M. c. cayanensis (Linnaeus, 1766)
- M. c. erythropterus (Lafresnaye, 1853)

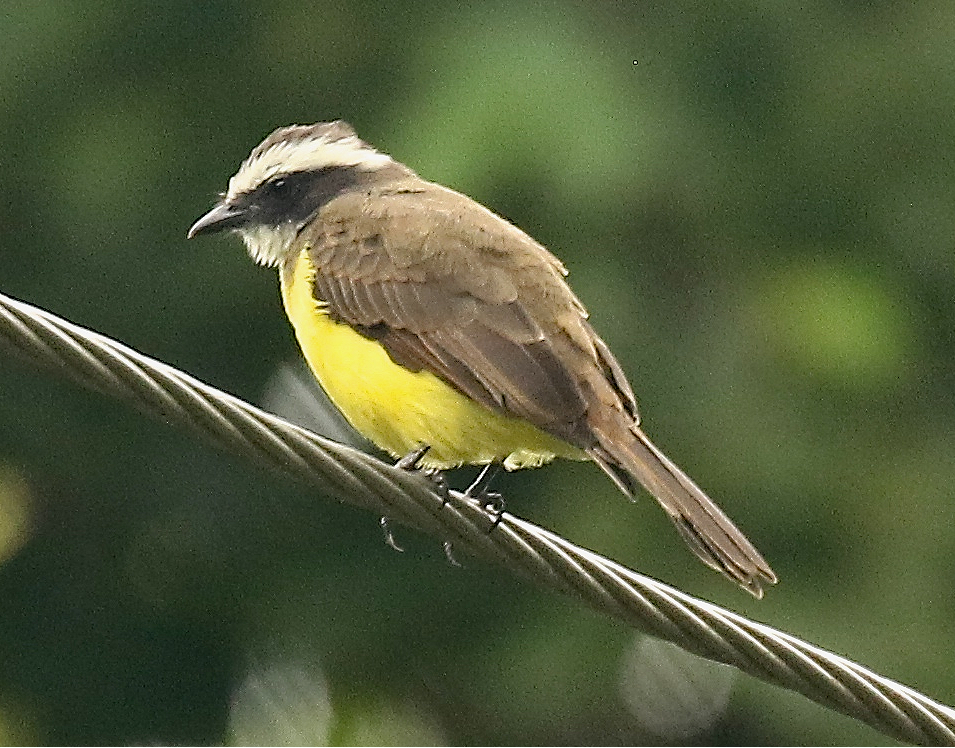
Near Playas de Juan Hombron, Panama

== Description ==
The rusty-margined flycatcher is 16.5 to 18 cm (6.5 to 7.1 in) long and weighs 22 to 29.5 g (0.78 to 1.0 oz). The sexes have the same plumage, though females average slightly smaller than males. Adults of the nominate subspecies M. c. cayanensis have a dark sooty brown to blackish brown crown with a mostly hidden bright yellow to golden-orange patch in the center. They have a white supercilium that begins on the forehead and extends far past the eye; the rest of their face is dark sooty brown to blackish brown. Their upperparts are plain brown to olive-brown. Their wings are deep grayish brown with dull olive edges on the inner secondaries, thin rusty or cinnamon-rufous edges on the outer secondaries and inner primaries, and thin rufous margins on the rest of the primaries. Their tail is dusky brownish with light olive edges on the feathers. Their chin and throat are white and their underparts are bright yellow. Juveniles are similar to adults but with no yellow on the crown and more rusty-cinnamon edges on the wing and tail feathers.

The other subspecies of the rusty-margined flycatcher differ from the nominate and each other thus:

- M. c. rufipennis: wider and bolder rufous on the wings and tail than nominate
- M. c. hellmayri: paler with more olivaceous upperparts and less rufous on the primaries than nominate
- M. c. erythropterus: largest subspecies, with more prominent rufous on the wings

All subspecies have a brown iris, a stubby black bill, and black legs and feet.

== Distribution and habitat ==
The subspecies of the rusty-margined flycatcher are found thus:

- M. c. rufipennis: Venezuela north of the Orinoco River and south through eastern Colombia and most of eastern Ecuador
- M. c. hellmayri: Pacific slope of Panama in Chiriquí and Veraguas provinces; from the Panama Canal Zone into western Colombia and south through western Ecuador and into northern Colombia, and east into western Venezuela's Maracaibo Basin, Zulia, and the western slope of the Andes from Táchira to Lara
- M. c. cayanensis: from southern Venezuela east across the Guianas and northern Brazil and south through Brazil (except the western Amazon Basin) to Mato Grosso do Sul, southeastern Peru's Madre de Dios Department, northern Bolivia, and extreme eastern Paraguay
- M. c. erythropterus: Rio de Janeiro and southern and eastern Minas Gerais states in southeastern Brazil

In addition there are at least three records of M. c. hellmayri in far southern Costa Rica and it has nested there. The species has also occurred as a vagrant in Argentina.

The rusty-margined flycatcher inhabits a variety of partially open landscapes. These include cultivated areas, clearings and pastures with shrubs, gallery forest, and the edges of more extensive forest. In the Amazon Basin it also occurs along rivers and oxbow lakes. In some areas it occurs in ranches, parks, and gardens but tends to stay away from human habitations there. In all locations if favors areas near water. In elevation it ranges from sea level to 2,000 m (6,600 ft) in Colombia, to 1,000 m (3,300 ft) in Ecuador, 1,900 m (6,200 ft) north of the Orinoco River and 1,000 m (3,300 ft) south of it in Venezuela, and to 1,000 m (3,300 ft) and locally higher in Brazil.

== Behavior ==
=== Movement ===
The rusty margined flycatcher appears to be a year-round resident in most of its range. However, its status as a resident or migrant in Venezuela south of the Orinoco River is uncertain as its numbers fluctuate there.

=== Feeding ===
The rusty-margined flycatcher feeds mostly on insects and also includes small fruits in its diet. It usually forages in pairs and sometimes in small groups. It usually perches in the open and takes much prey with sallies to the ground or vegetation and in mid-air by hawking; often the sallies are over water. It usually takes fruit by gleaning or snatching while briefly hovering.

=== Breeding ===
The rusty-margined flycatcher's breeding season has not been fully defined. It includes March and April in Panama, March to August in Venezuela, and multiple months throughout the year in Colombia. Its nest is a bulky dome with a side entrance made from twigs and dry grass. It typically is placed fairly conspicuously in a branch crotch between about 2 and 4 m (7 and 13 ft) above the ground. The clutch is two or three eggs that are white with a rosy yellow tinge and chestnut-brown markings. The incubation period and details of parental care are not known. At one study site in Panama fledging occurred 17 to 21 days after hatch.

=== Vocalization ===
The rusty-margined flycatcher's dawn song is "a repeated fwee, sometimes with short couplet or additional note added". Its most common call is "a thin, whining, almost plaintive peeeeeeeea or wheeeeee" that may be repeated several times. Other calls include a "loud and emphatic uuuuureeeéét-éét-éét or too-eeéet" and a "quick rolling series of keé-wit tis-u or chew-chewit" notes. The series is often repeated several times and is sometimes made by a pair in duet.

== Status ==
The IUCN has assessed the rusty-margined flycatcher as being of Least Concern. It has an extremely large range and its estimated population of at least fifty million mature individuals is believed to be stable. No immediate threats have been identified. It is considered very common in Colombia, fairly common in Ecuador, locally fairly common in Peru, common north of the Orinoco and less numerous south of it in Venezuela, and common in Brazil. It is "[t]olerant of converted habitats, and occurs in many national parks and other protected areas throughout its large range".
