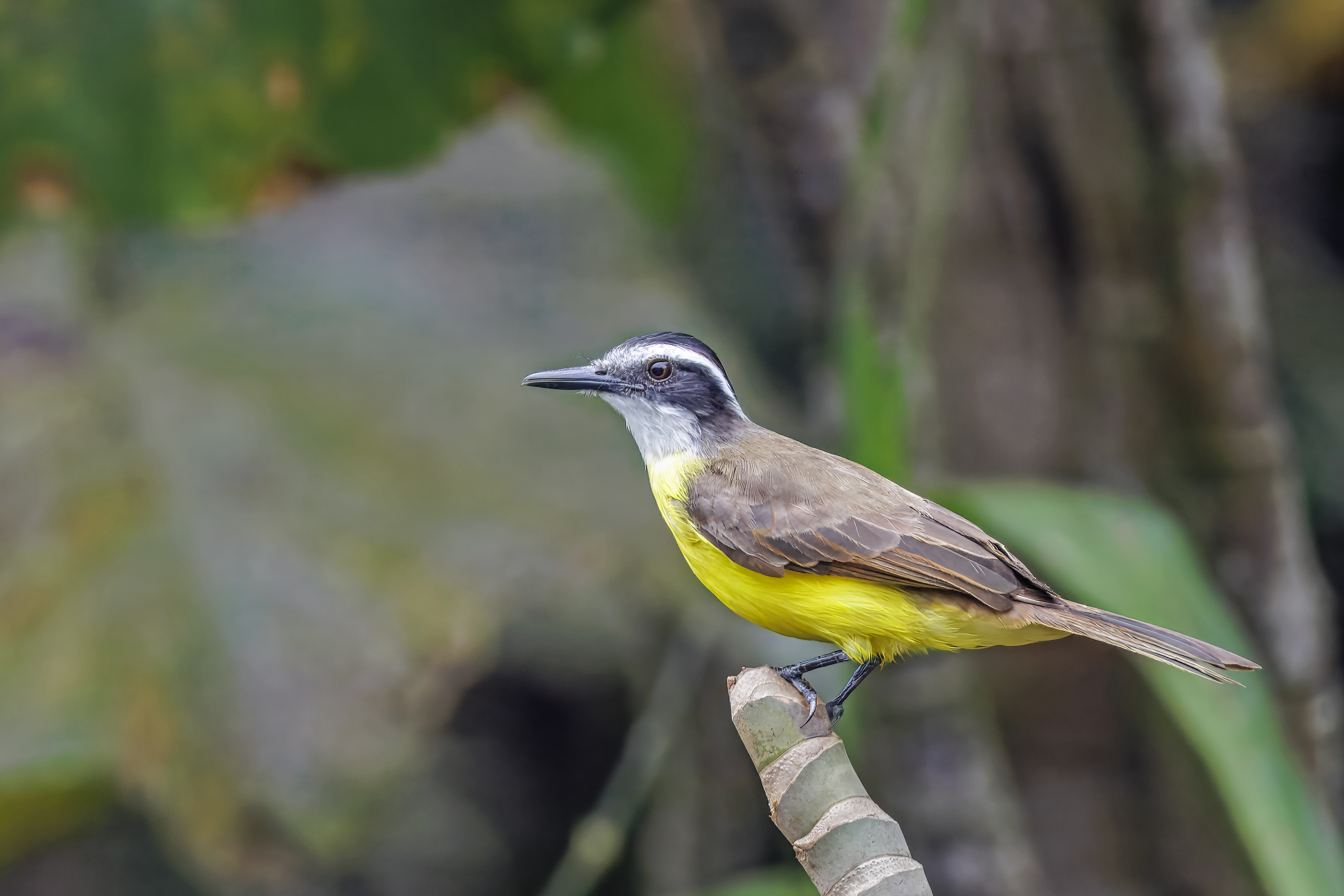
- P. l. lictor Rio Napo, Ecuador
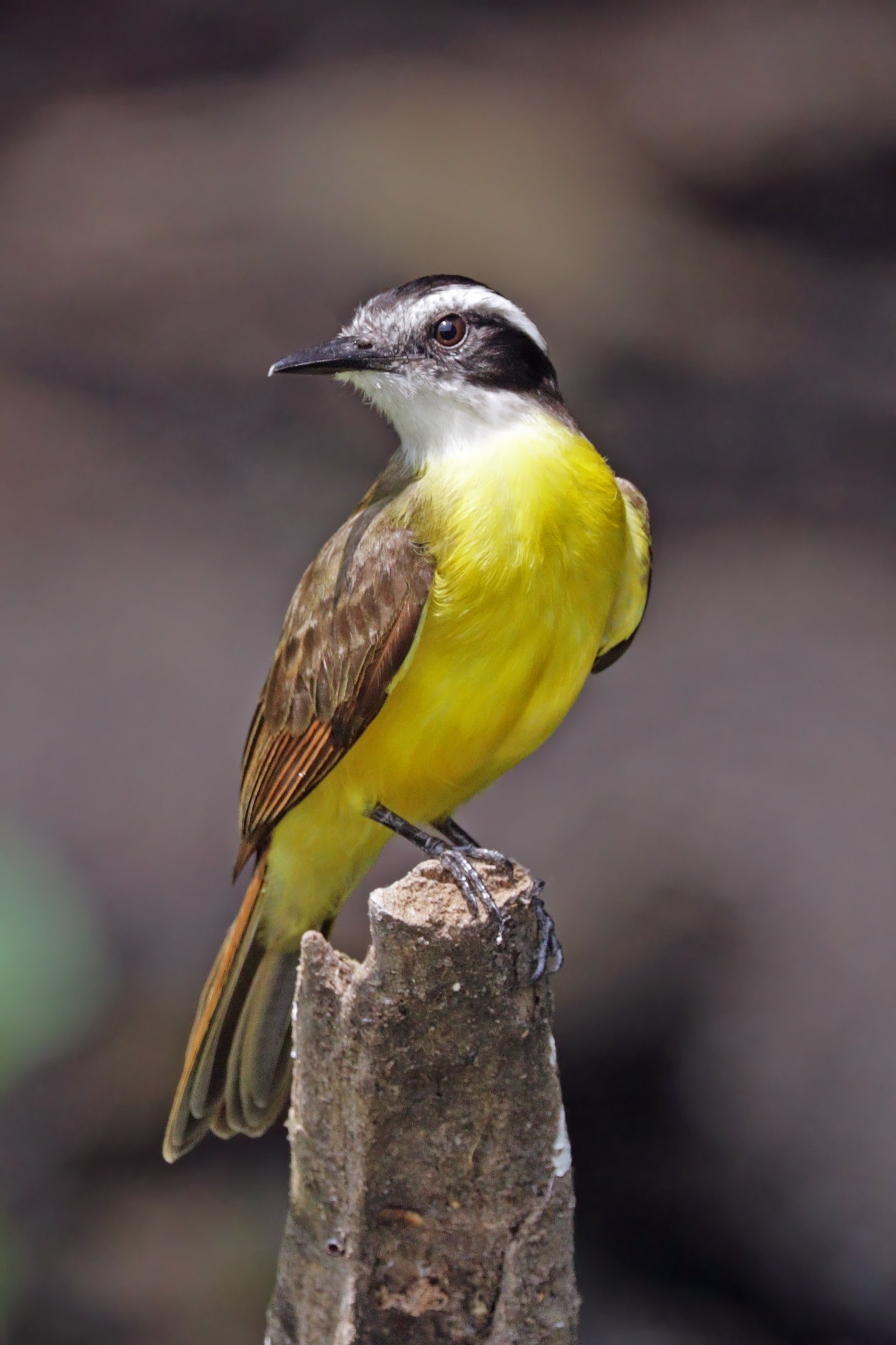
- P. l. panamense Chagres River, Panama

Conservation status
- Least Concern (IUCN 3.1)

Scientific classification
- Kingdom: Animalia
- Phylum: Chordata
- Class: Aves
- Order: Passeriformes
- Family: Tyrannidae
- Genus: Philohydor; Lanyon, W, 1984
- Species: P. lictor

Binomial name
- Philohydor lictor (Lichtenstein, MHC, 1823)

Synonyms
- Lanius lictor (protonym); Pitangus lictor

= Lesser kiskadee =

Species of bird

The lesser kiskadee (Philohydor lictor) is a species of passerine bird in the family Tyrannidae, the tyrant flycatchers. It is found in Panama and every mainland South American country except Chile, Paraguay, and Uruguay, though only as a vagrant in Argentina.

== Taxonomy and systematics ==
The lesser kiskadee was described by the German naturalist and explorer Hinrich Lichtenstein in 1823 and given the binomial name Lanius lictor, mistakenly placing it with the shrikes. It was later moved to genus Pitangus to join the great kiskadee (P. sulphuratus). As early as 1957 one author suggested that it belonged in its own genus. Its present genus Philohydor was introduced by the American ornithologist Wesley Edwin Lanyon in 1984. By 2001 some authors had adopted the movement of the lesser kiskadee to that genus. BirdLife International's Handbook of the Birds of the World adopted it in 2016 and the IOC by 2018. The North American Classification Committee of the American Ornithological Society and the Clements taxonomy adopted it in 2022 and the AOS South American Classification Committee in early 2023.

The genus name Philohydor is from Ancient Greek philos for "-loving" and hudōr, "water". The specific epithet lictor is the Latin word for a magistrate's bodyguard who carried out sentences.

The lesser kiskadee is the only member of its genus and has two subspecies, the nominate P. l. lictor (Lichtenstein, MHK, 1823) and P. l. panamensis (Bangs & Penard, TE, 1918).

== Description ==
The lesser kiskadee is 15 to 18 cm (5.9 to 7.1 in) long and weighs about 25 g (0.88 oz). The sexes have the same plumage; females are slightly smaller than males. Adults of the nominate subspecies have a black or sooty crown and face with a mostly hidden bright yellow patch in the center of the crown. They have a wide white supercilium that begins at the forehead and wraps almost all the way around the nape. They have mostly plain olive upperparts with grayish brown to dark olive uppertail coverts. Their wings are dark grayish brown with pale cinnamon or rufous edges on the flight feathers. Their tail is mostly dark grayish brown with cinnamon or rusty outer edges on the innermost pair of feathers and paler grayish brown outer edges on the rest. The inner webs of all the tail feathers have thin pale cinnamon edges. Their chin and throat are white and their underparts are bright yellow. Subspecies P. l. panamensis has the same plumage as the nominate but is noticeably smaller. Juveniles have little or no yellow on the crown and more browish olive upperparts, more prominent rufous edges on the wings and tail feathers, and paler underparts than adults. Both subspecies have a dark iris, a long, slender, blackish bill, and black to blackish brown legs and feet.

== Distribution and habitat ==
The lesser kiskadee has a disjunct distribution. Subspecies P. l. panamensis is found from the Panama Canal Zone east along the Caribbean coast of Colombia slightly into northwestern Venezuela. The nominate subspecies has two populations. One ranges along eastern Brazil from Pernambuco south to Rio de Janeiro state. The other range is much larger. From the eastern half of Colombia it extends south through eastern Ecuador and eastern Peru into northern Bolivia and east from that area across the northern half of Venezuela, the Guianas, and most of Amazonian Brazil. It has also been recorded as a vagrant in Argentina. One researcher contends that the apparent gap between the nominate's two ranges is an artifact of low sampling effort and overlooked early records from the area.

The lesser kiskadee inhabits a variety of landscapes in the tropical zone; in all of them it is found near water. Its habitats include marshy, shrubby, pasture; grasslands along waterways with shrubs, low trees, and snags; wooded borders along streams, rivers, and oxbow lakes; and sometimes mangroves and the edges of saltwater lagoons. In elevation in Brazil it ranges from sea level mostly to 500 m (1,600 ft) but "locally may be higher". It reaches 500 m (1,600 ft) in Colombia and Ecuador, 750 m (2,500 ft) in Peru, and mostly to 350 m (1,100 ft) with a sight record at 1,300 m (4,300 ft) in Venezuela.

== Behavior ==
=== Movement ===
The lesser kiskadee is thought to be a year-round resident across its range.

=== Feeding ===
The lesser kiskadee feeds on insects. It usually forages in pairs though sometimes singly or in small family groups. It perches up to about 3 m (10 ft) above the ground or water. It captures most prey with sallies to snatch it from vegetation or the surface of standing water. It occasionally drops to the ground to take prey there.

=== Breeding ===
The lesser kiskadee's breeding season has not been fully defined. It spans June to October in Venezuela, October to January in Peru, and includes June and July in Colombia and March and April in Panama. Its nest is an open cup made from small twigs and coarse grass lined with finer grass, leaves, and rootlets. It is usually placed in a shrub, small tree, or on a stump near or over water. In a study in Panama, eight nests were placed between 1.2 and 2.4 m (4 and 8 ft) above the substrate. The clutch size is two or three eggs. In the Panama study, almost all of the incubation of the clutch and brooding of nestlings were by the female. Both parents provisioned nestlings. The incubation period and time to fledging were not determined.

=== Vocalization ===
The lesser kiskadee's calls include "a vigorous, buzzy, rather nasal dzay or dzweey", a "more prolonged dzay-dzwey-dwzee-zwee", and "keekzi-deeée, queé-be and dree, dear-wrr". "[P]artners also give chattery ca-déde in greeting."

== Status ==
The IUCN has assessed the lesser kiskadee as being of Least Concern. It has a large range; its population of at least five million mature idividuals is believed to be decreasing. No immediate threats have been identified. It is considered fairly common overall. It "[o]ccurs in many national parks and other protected areas [and much] of this species' habitat within its area of distribution remains in pristine or near-pristine condition."
