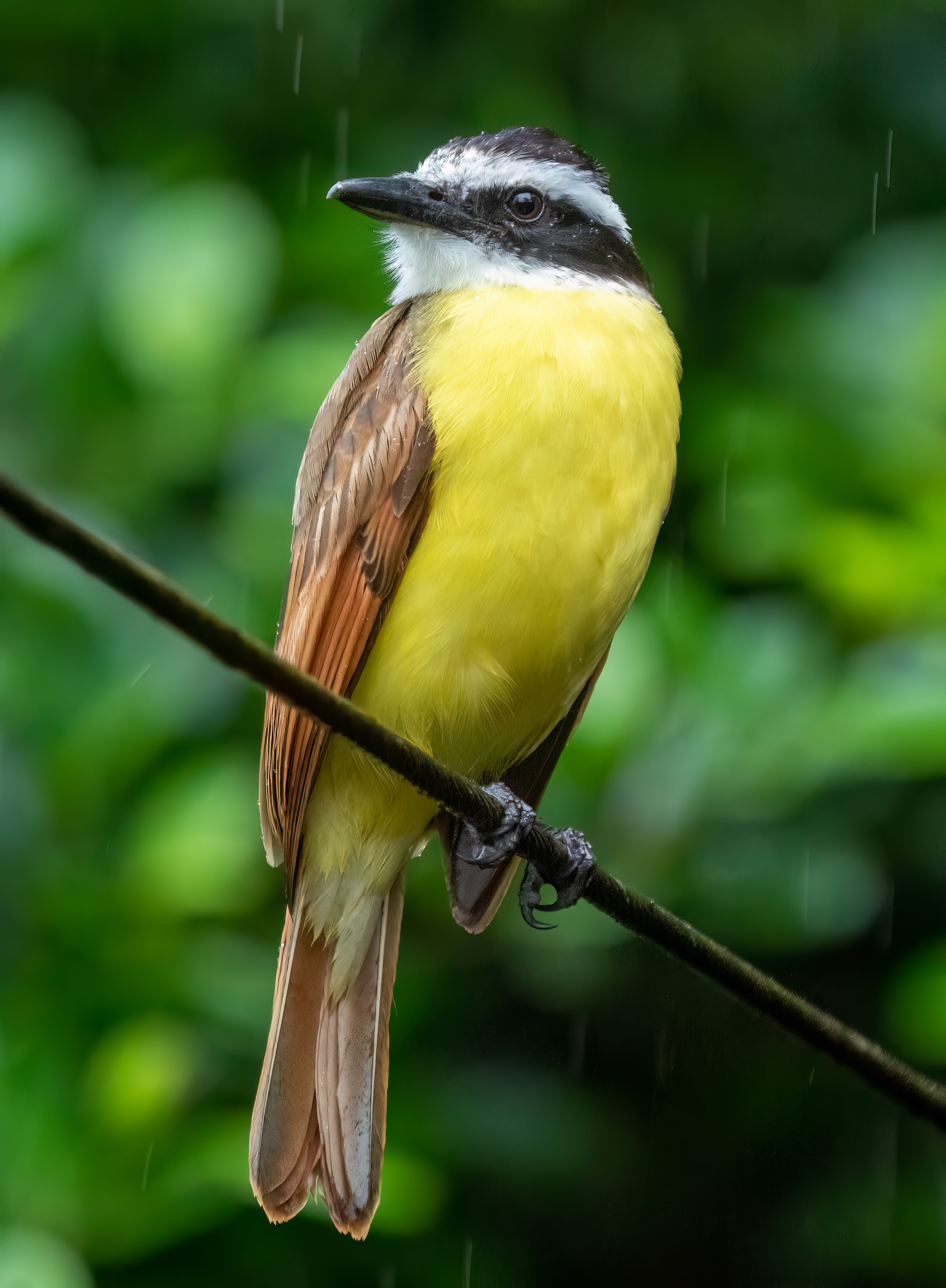
- A great kiskadee in La Fortuna, Costa Rica

Conservation status
- Least Concern (IUCN 3.1)

Scientific classification
- Kingdom: Animalia
- Phylum: Chordata
- Class: Aves
- Order: Passeriformes
- Family: Tyrannidae
- Genus: Pitangus; Swainson, 1827
- Species: P. sulphuratus

Binomial name
- Pitangus sulphuratus (Linnaeus, 1766)

Synonyms
- Lanius sulphuratus Linnaeus, 1766; Saurophagus sulphuratus Swainson, 1832

Audio
- Song and call recorded in Rio de Janeiro, Brazil

= Great kiskadee =

Species of bird

The great kiskadee (Pitangus sulphuratus) is a passerine bird in the tyrant flycatcher family Tyrannidae. It is the only member of the genus Pitangus. It breeds in open woodland with some tall trees, including cultivation and around human habitation. It is found from the extreme southern United States south to Argentina. It was introduced to Bermuda in 1957, and to Tobago in about 1970.

== Taxonomy ==
The great kiskadee was described and illustrated in 1648 by the German naturalist Georg Marcgrave in the Historia Naturalis Brasiliae. He used the name Pitangua-guaçu, the word for a large flycatcher in the Tupi language. In 1760 the French zoologist Mathurin Jacques Brisson included a description of the species in his Ornithologie based on a specimen collected in Cayenne, French Guiana. He used the French name La Pie-Griesche jaune de Cayenne and the Latin name Lanius Cayanensis Luteus. Although Brisson coined Latin names, these do not conform to the binomial system and are not recognised by the International Commission on Zoological Nomenclature.

When the Swedish naturalist Carl Linnaeus updated his Systema Naturae for the twelfth edition in 1766 he added 240 species that had been previously described by Brisson in his Ornithologie. One of these was the great kiskadee. Linnaeus included a terse description, coined the binomial name Lanius sulphuratus, and cited Brisson's work. The specific name sulphuratus is Latin for 'sulphur'. The word had been used by Brisson in describing the yellow colour of the underparts of the bird.

The great kiskadee is now the only species placed in the genus Pitangus that was introduced by the English naturalist William Swainson in 1827. The lesser kiskadee was at one time also placed in Pitangus but in 1984 the American ornithologist Wesley E. Lanyon moved the lesser kiskadee to its own monotypic genus Philohydor. This has been accepted by some ornithologists, but not all. The bird was formerly also known as the Derby flycatcher.

Ten subspecies are recognised:

- P. s. texanus van Rossem, 1940 – south Texas to east Mexico
- P. s. derbianus (Kaup, 1852) – west Mexico
- P. s. guatimalensis (Lafresnaye, 1852) – southeast Mexico to central Panama
- P. s. rufipennis (Lafresnaye, 1851) – north Colombia and north Venezuela
- P. s. caucensis Chapman, 1914 – west and south Colombia
- P. s. trinitatis Hellmayr, 1906 – east Colombia, south and east Venezuela and northwest Brazil, Trinidad
- P. s. sulphuratus (Linnaeus, 1766) – the Guianas and north, west, central Amazonian Brazil, southeast Colombia, and east Ecuador to southeast Peru
- P. s. maximiliani (Cabanis & Heine, 1859) – north, east Bolivia and west, central Paraguay to east and south Brazil
- P. s. bolivianus (Lafresnaye, 1852) – central Bolivia
- P. s. argentinus Todd, 1952 – east Paraguay, southeast Brazil, and Uruguay to central Argentina

== Description ==
The adult great kiskadee is one of the largest of the tyrant flycatchers. It is 25 to 28 cm (9.8 to 11.0 in) in length and weighs 53 to 71.5 g (1.87 to 2.52 oz). The head is black with a strong white supercilium and a concealed yellow crown stripe. The upperparts are brown, and the wings and tail are brown with usually strong rufous fringes. The bill is short, thick, and black in color. The similar boat-billed flycatcher (Megarynchus pitangua) has a more massive black bill, an olive-brown back, and very little rufous in the tail and wings. A few other tyrant flycatchers – the social flycatcher (Myiozetetes similis), for example – share a similar color pattern, but these species are markedly smaller.

The call is an exuberant BEE-tee-WEE, and the bird has an onomatopoeic name in different languages and countries: In Brazil its popular name is bem-te-vi ("I saw you well") and in Spanish-speaking countries it is often bien-te-veo ("I see you well") and sometimes shortened to benteveo. In Venezuela it is called "cristofué" or "Christ did it".

== Distribution and habitat ==
The great kiskadee occupies a wide range of habitats, from open grassland with scattered trees to urban areas. Its range extends from the Lower Rio Grande Valley in southern Texas south through Central America to southern Argentina. It does not regularly occur in Chile. The great kiskadee was introduced to Bermuda in 1957. Two hundred birds were imported from Trinidad in an attempt to control the number of lizards, especially the tree lizard (Anolis grahami) which had itself been introduced. The birds bred successfully and by 1976 the population on the island had expanded to around 60,000. The great kiskadee is omnivorous and has failed to control the number of lizards.

== Behaviour and ecology ==
The great kiskadee is a common, noisy, and conspicuous bird. It is omnivorous and hunts like a shrike or flycatcher, waiting on an open perch high in a tree to sally out and catch insects in flight or to pounce upon rodents and similar small vertebrates (such as other birds' chicks and bats). It will also take prey (such as small snakes, lizards, frogs, perched insects, spiders, millipedes and land snails) and some seeds and fruit from vegetation by gleaning and jumping for it or ripping it off in mid-hover, and occasionally dives for freshwater snails, fish or tadpoles in shallow water, making it one of the few fishing passerines. It also visits feeding stations to eat bread, dog food, bananas and peanut butter/seed mixture. Kiskadees like to hunt on their own or in pairs, and though they might be expected to make good use of prey flushed by but too large for the smaller birds of the understory, they do not seem to join mixed-species feeding flocks very often. When they do, they hunt in the familiar manner. Such opportunistic feeding behavior makes it one of the most common birds in urban areas around Latin America; its flashy belly and its shrill call make it one of the most conspicuous.

=== Breeding ===
Great kiskadees are monogamous and defend a territory. Both sexes build a large domed nest that has a side entrance. It is chiefly composed of grasses and small twigs but can also incorporate lichen, string, and plastic. The birds will steal material from other nests. The nest is placed in a wide range of sites, often in an exposed position high up in a tree or on man-made structures. Occasionally the nest is placed in a cavity. The clutch is 3 to 4 eggs. These are moderately glossy, light yellowish cream in colour with purplish black and purplish brown spots. The average size is 27.9 mm × 20.0 mm (1.10 in × 0.79 in). Only the female incubates the eggs; the male guards the nest while she leaves the nest to feed. The eggs hatch after 16–17 days. The chicks are fed by both parents and fledge after 17–18 days.

=== Food and feeding ===
This alert and aggressive bird has a strong and maneuverable flight, which it uses to good effect when it feels annoyed by raptors. Even much larger birds are attacked by the great kiskadee, usually by diving down or zooming straight at them while they are in mid-air. Harsh calls are also often given during these attacks, alerting all potential prey in the area of the predator's presence. If not very hungry, any raptor subject to a great kiskadee's mobbing behavior is likely to leave, as it is well-nigh impossible to make a good catch when subject to the tyrant flycatcher's unwelcome attention. In general, avian predators are liable to steer clear of an alert great kiskadee, lest their hunting success be spoiled, and will hunt the great kiskadee itself – though it is as meaty as a fat thrush – only opportunistically.

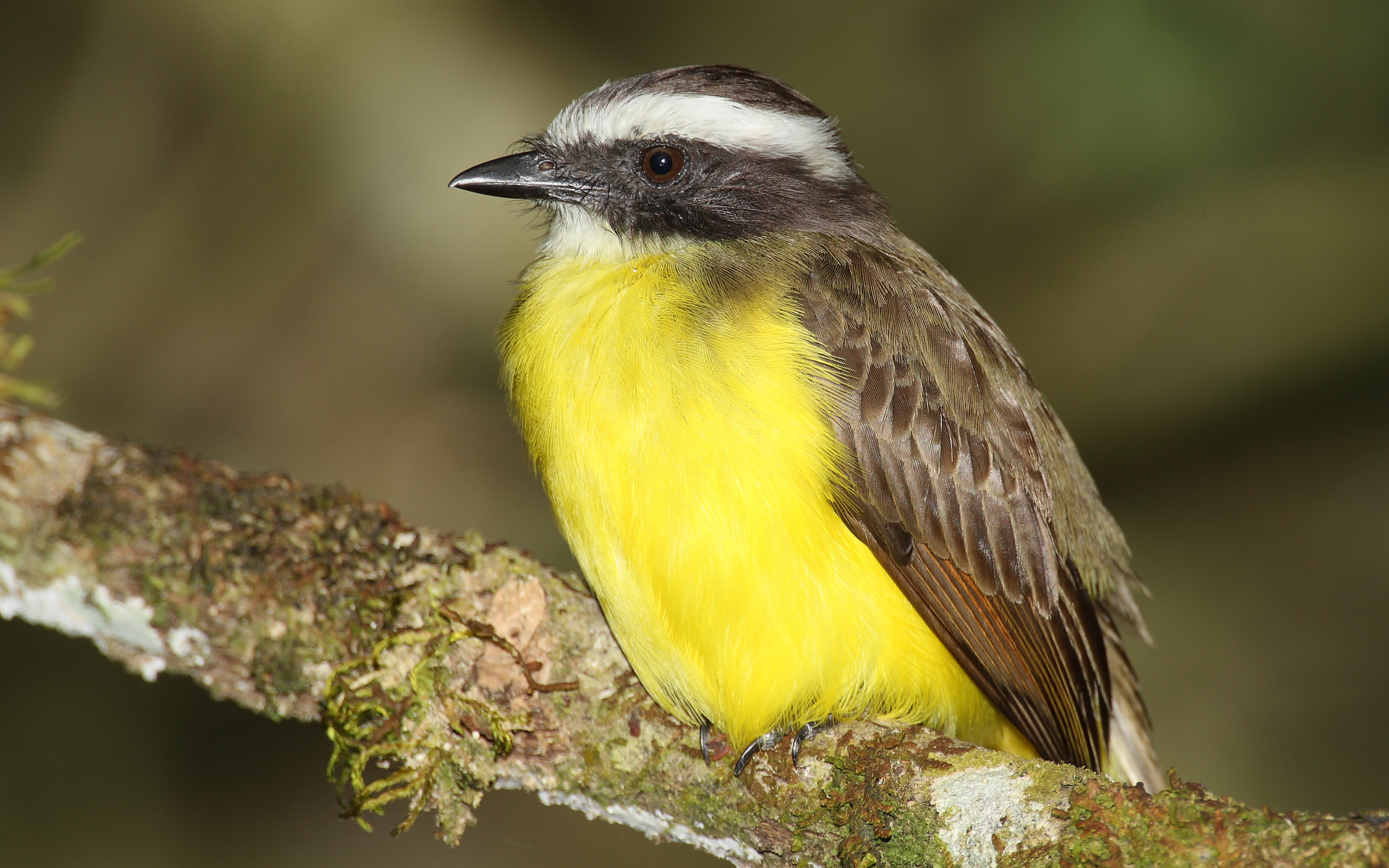
One of the diverse tyrant flycatchers resembling the great kiskadee in color is the aptly named Myiozetetes similis.

To mammalian and squamate predators that can sneak up on the nesting or sleeping birds, it is more vulnerable, however. Even omnivorous mammals as small as the common marmoset (Callithrix jacchus) will try to plunder great kiskadee nests – at least during the dry season when fruits are scarce – despite the birds' attempts to defend their offspring. One of two birds studied in the Parque Nacional de La Macarena of Colombia was parasitized by microfilariae.

== Status ==
Not being appreciated for its song, the great kiskadee is not usually kept caged and therefore has escaped the depredations of poaching for the pet trade. Also, its feeding mostly on live prey makes it extremely difficult to keep in captivity. It is not considered threatened by the IUCN.

== Gallery ==
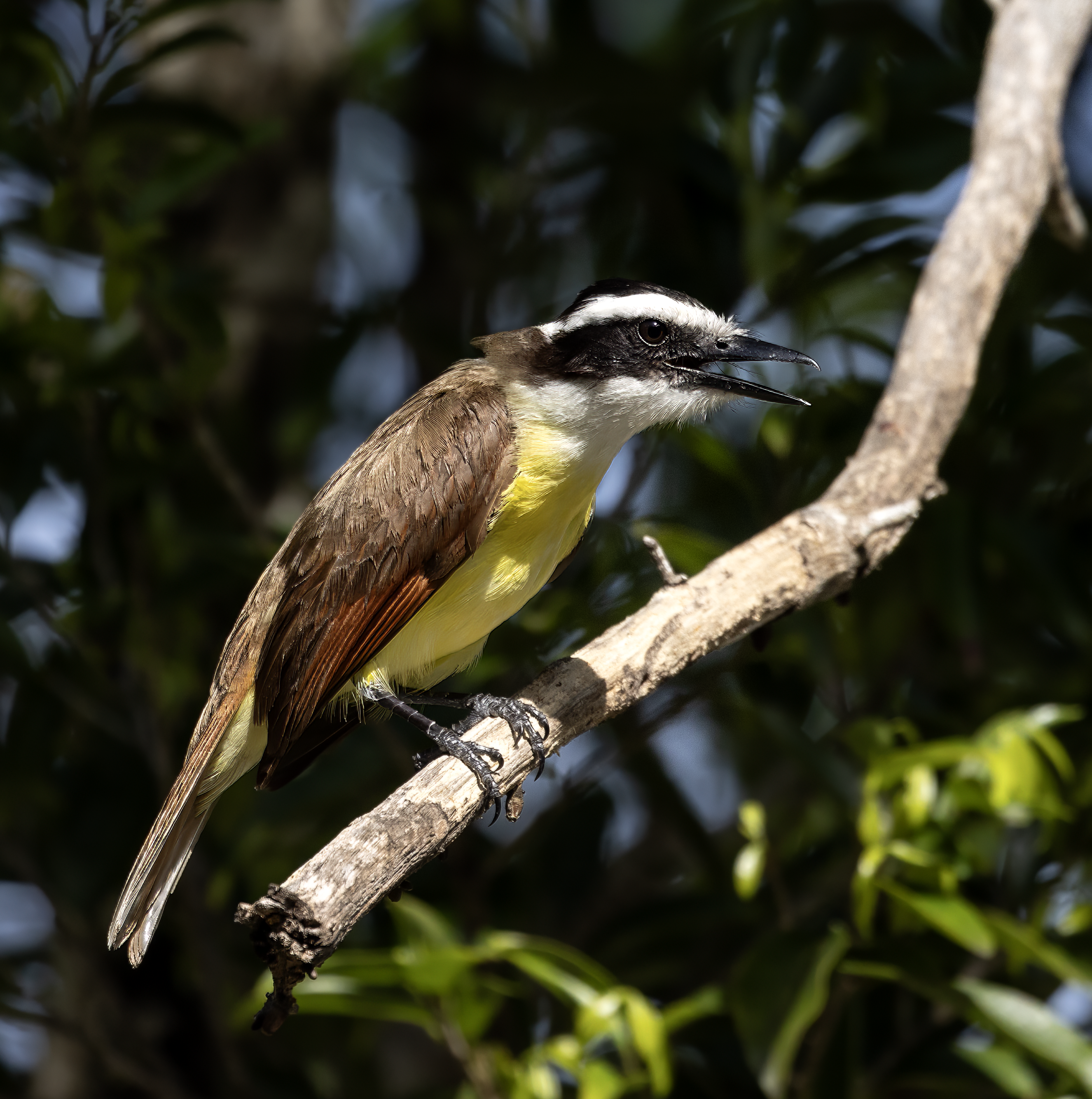
Perched in Tulum, MX.

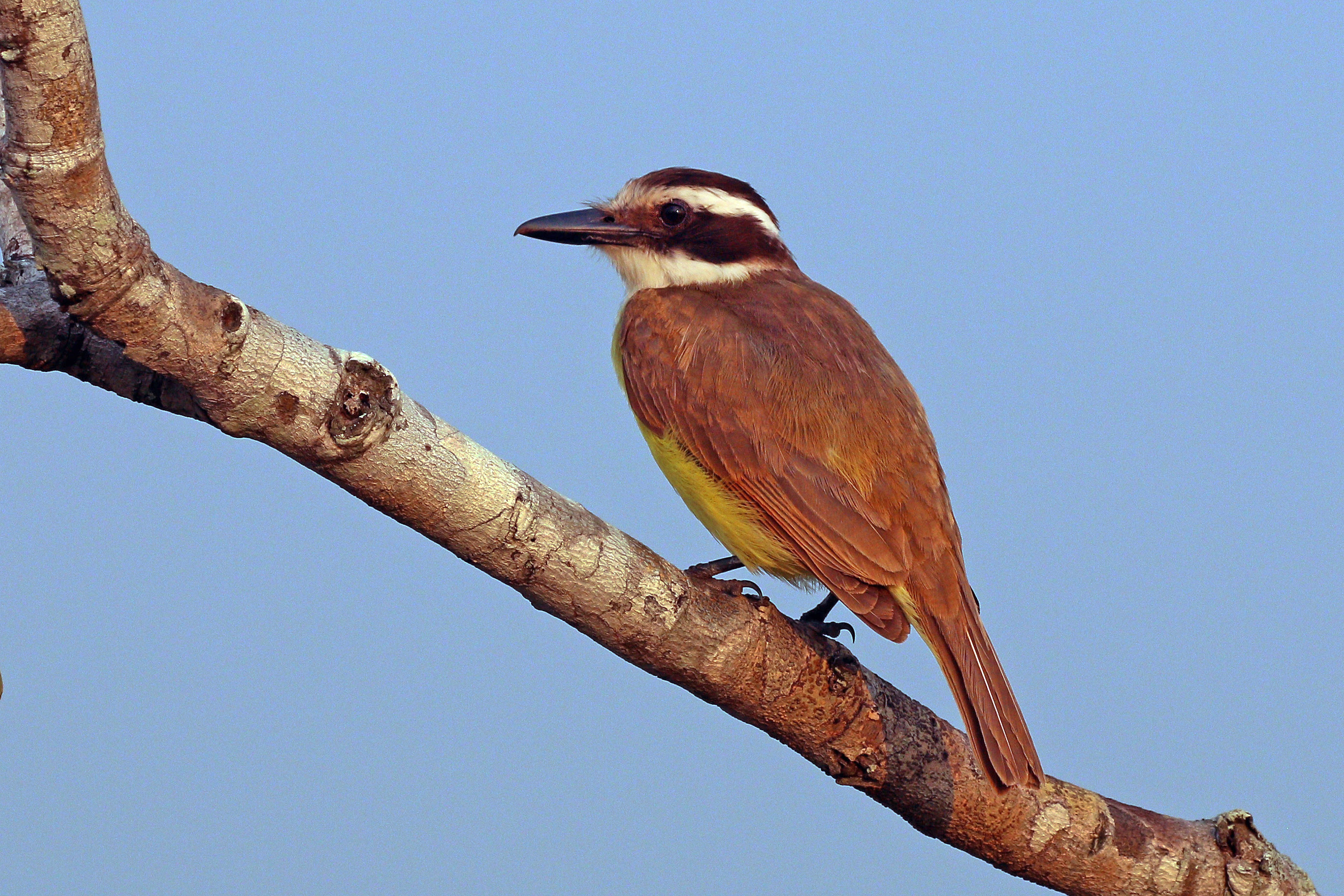
P. s. maximiliani
Brazil

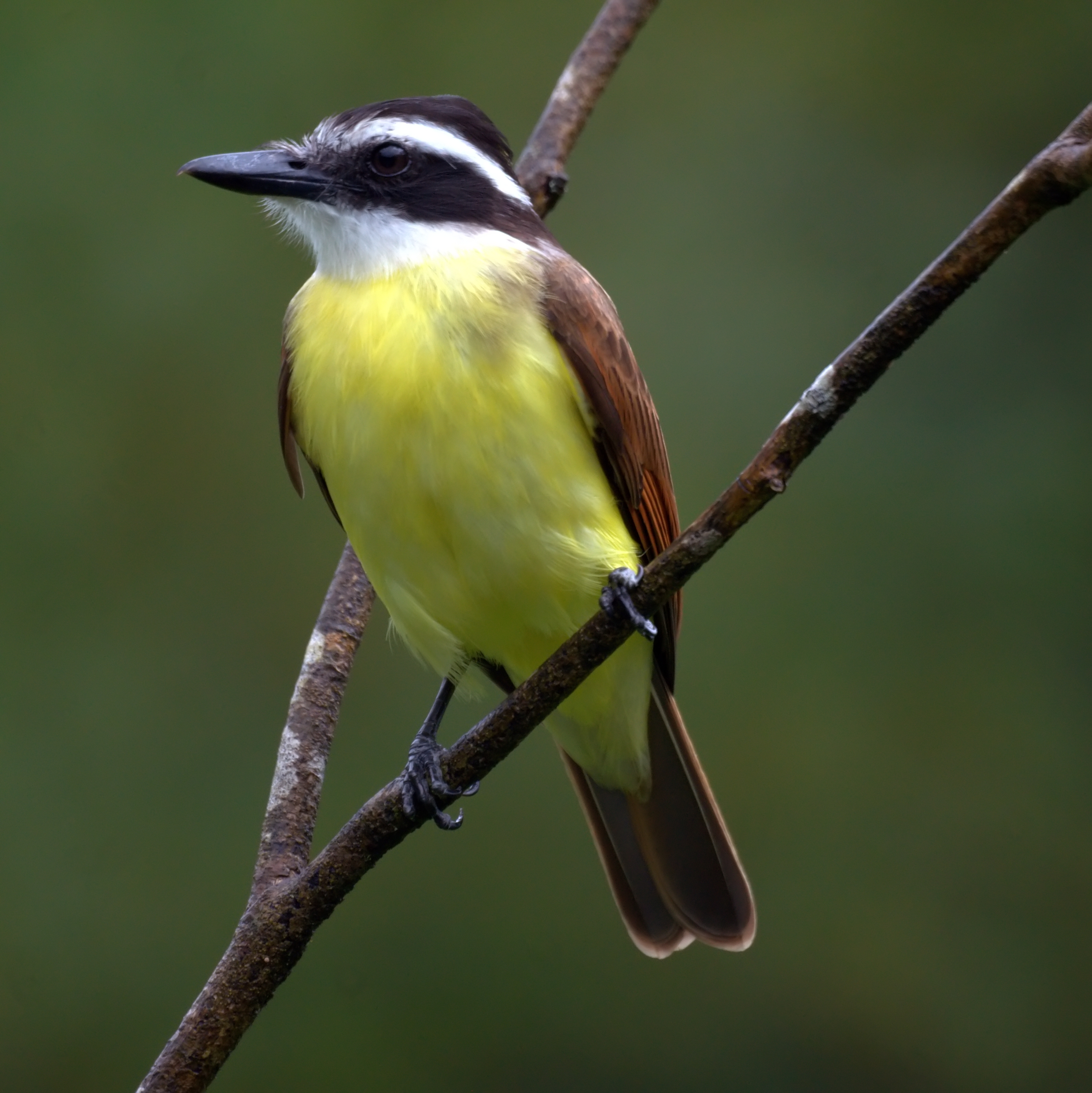
Possibly from Trinidad and Tobago

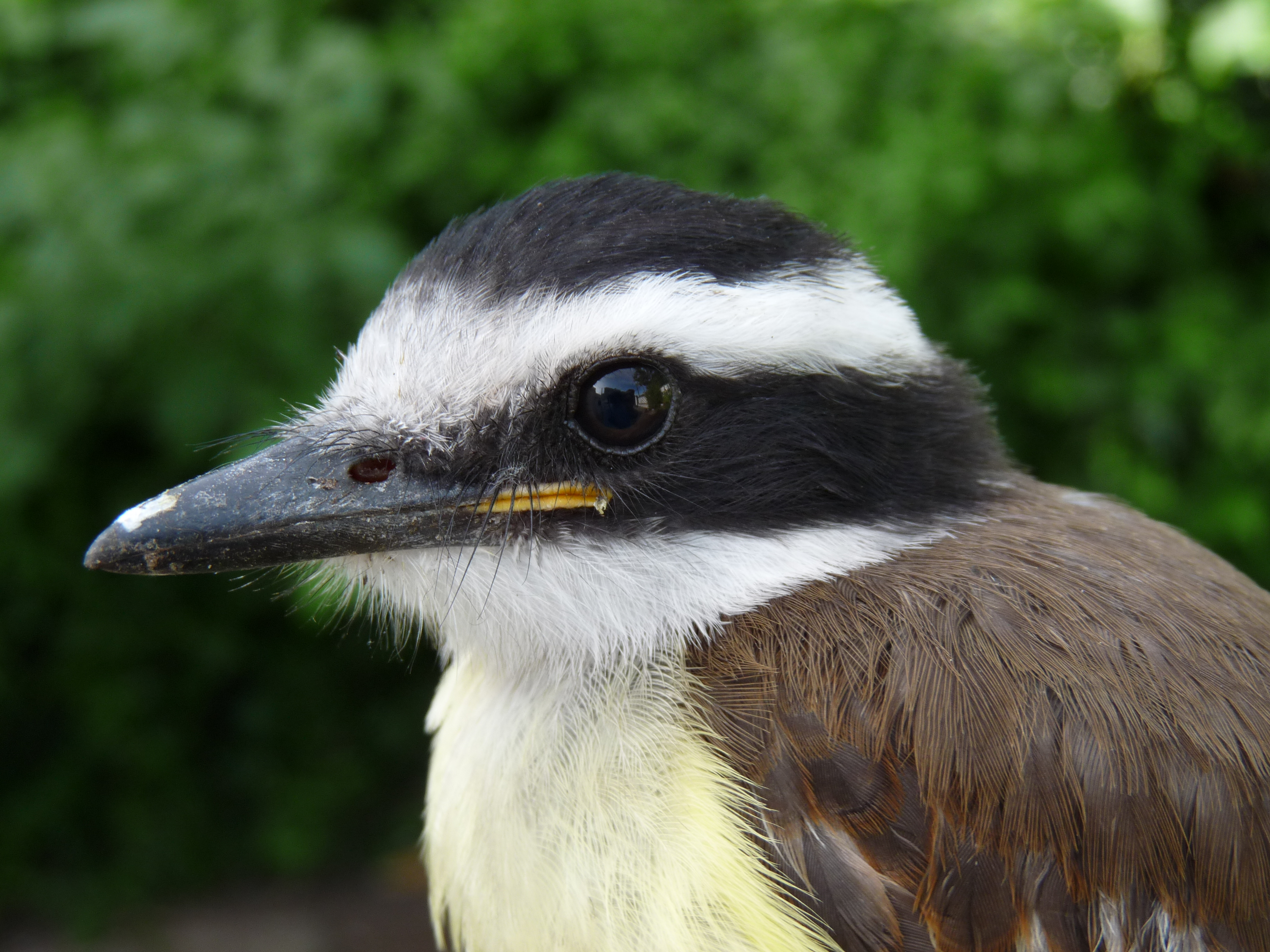
Montevideo, Uruguay

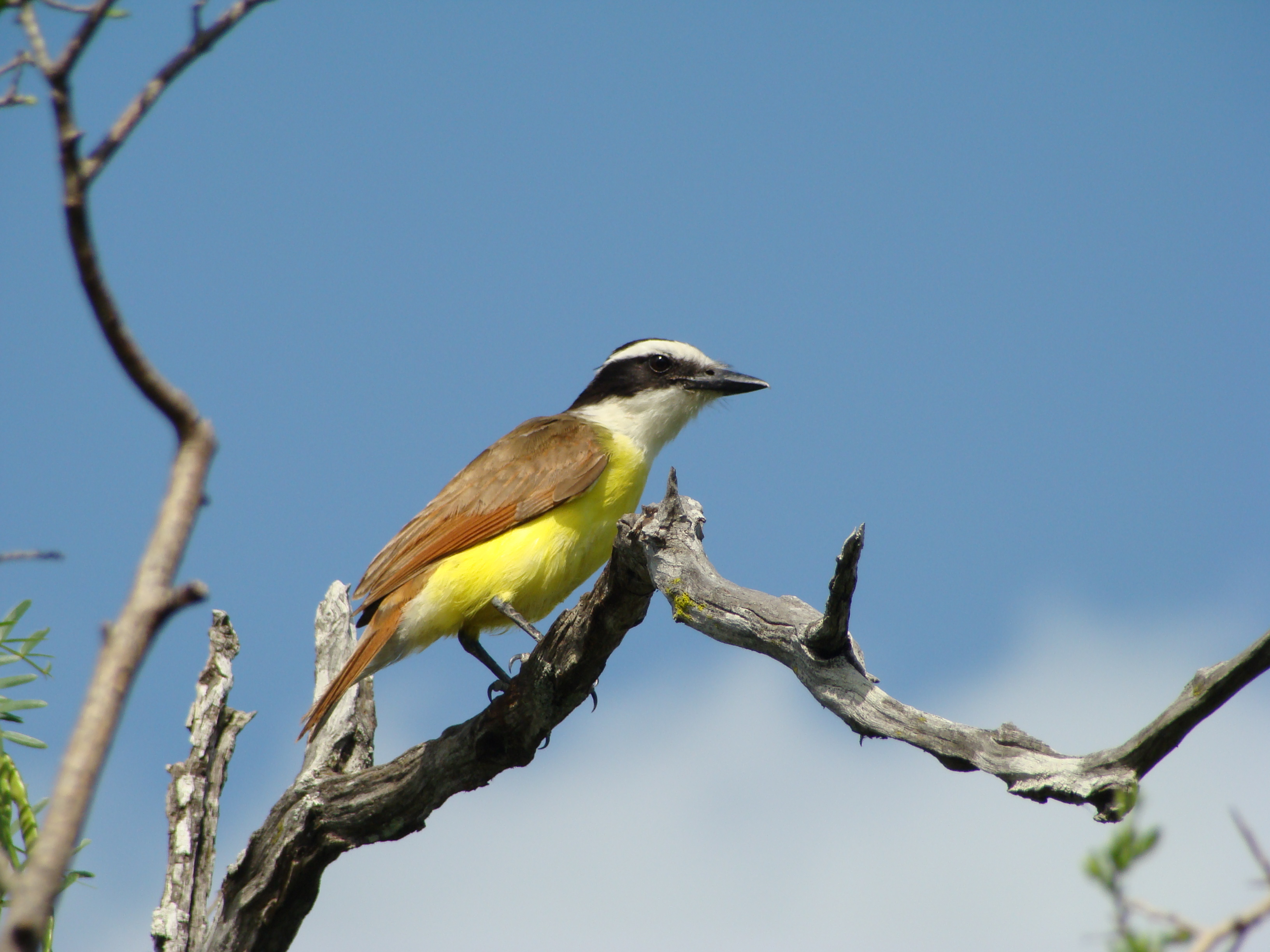
Beeville, Texas

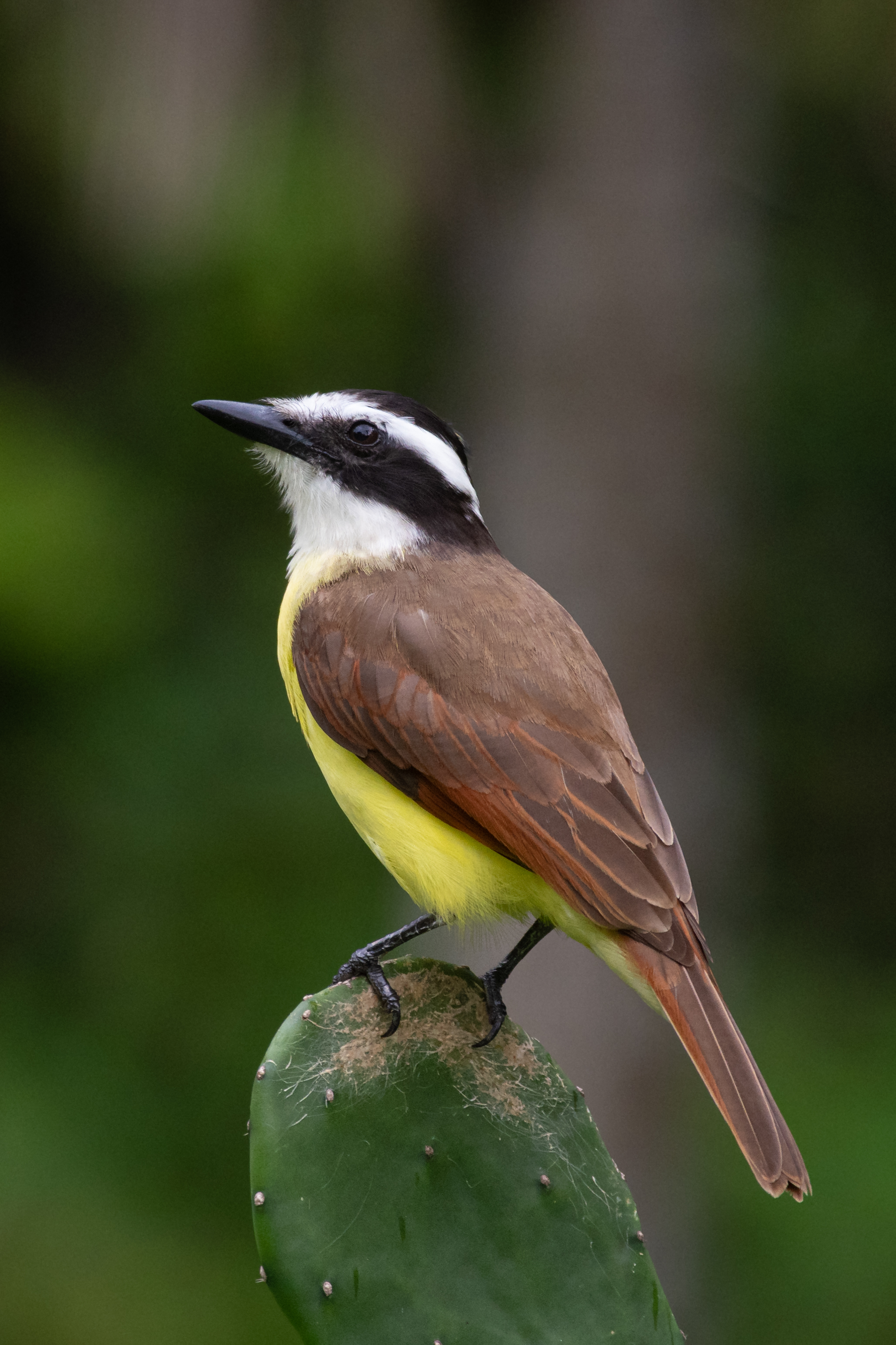
Pitangus sulphuratus guatimalensis, Costa Rica

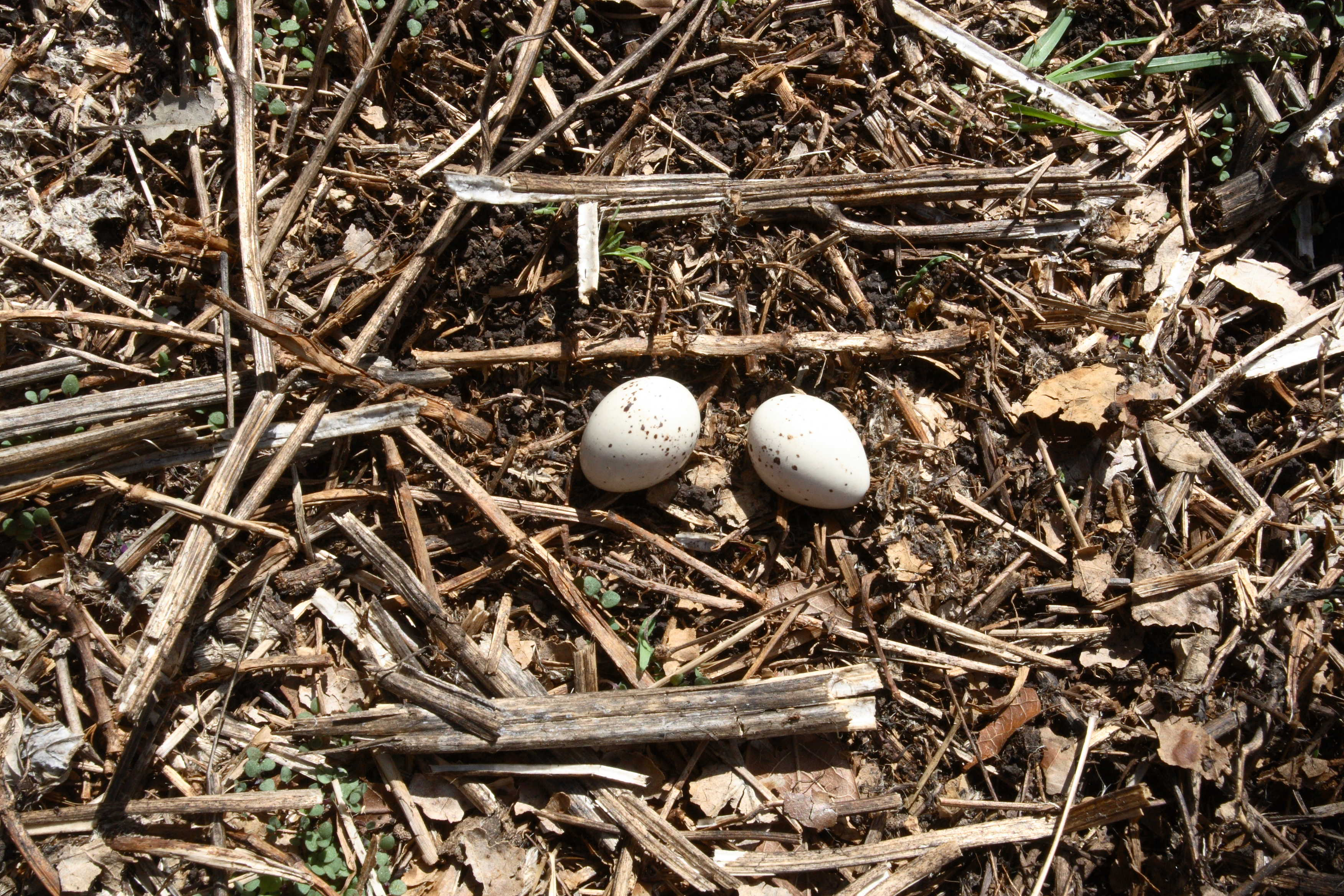
Eggs from a nest near El Copey de Dota, Costa Rica

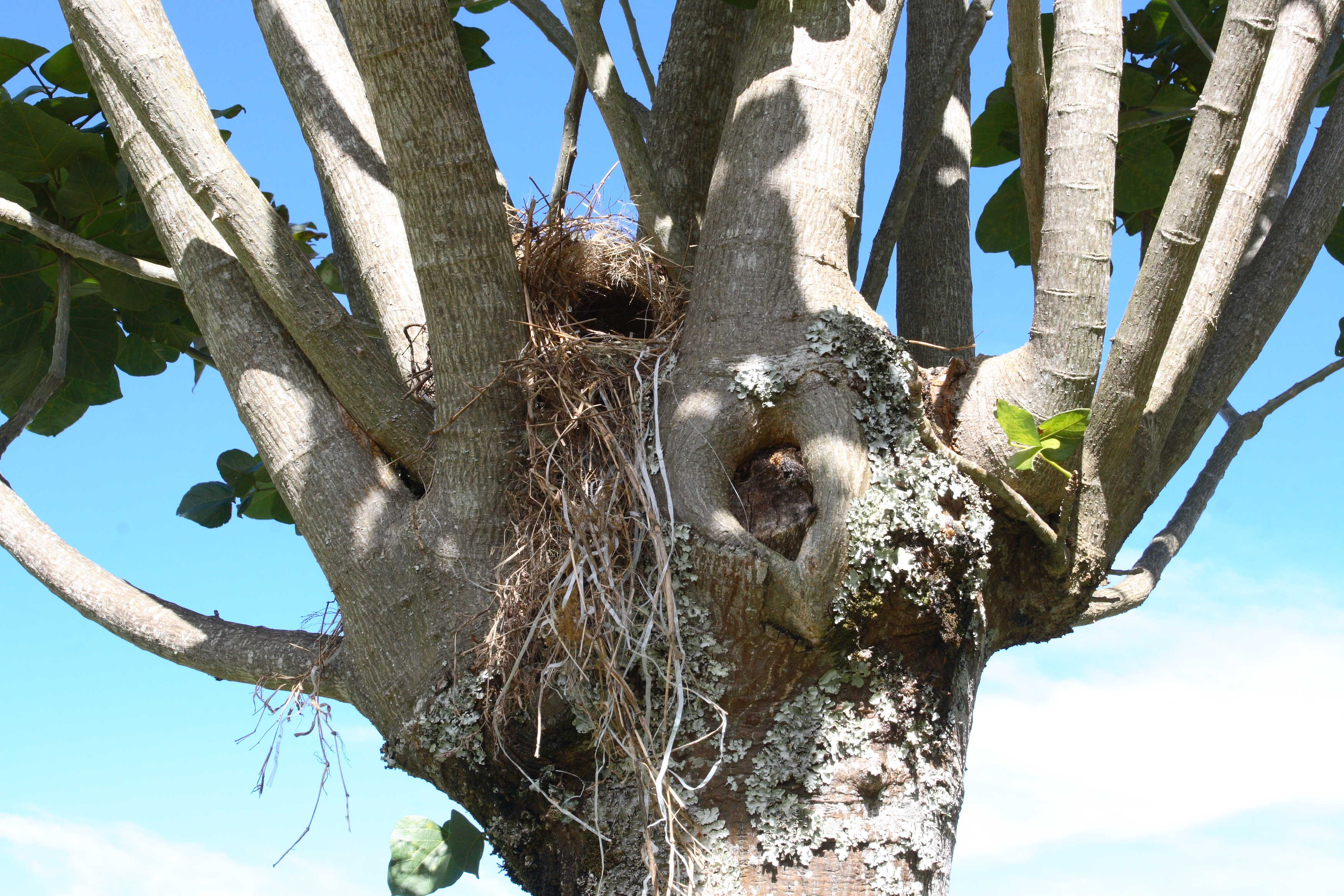
Nest near El Copey de Dota, Costa Rica

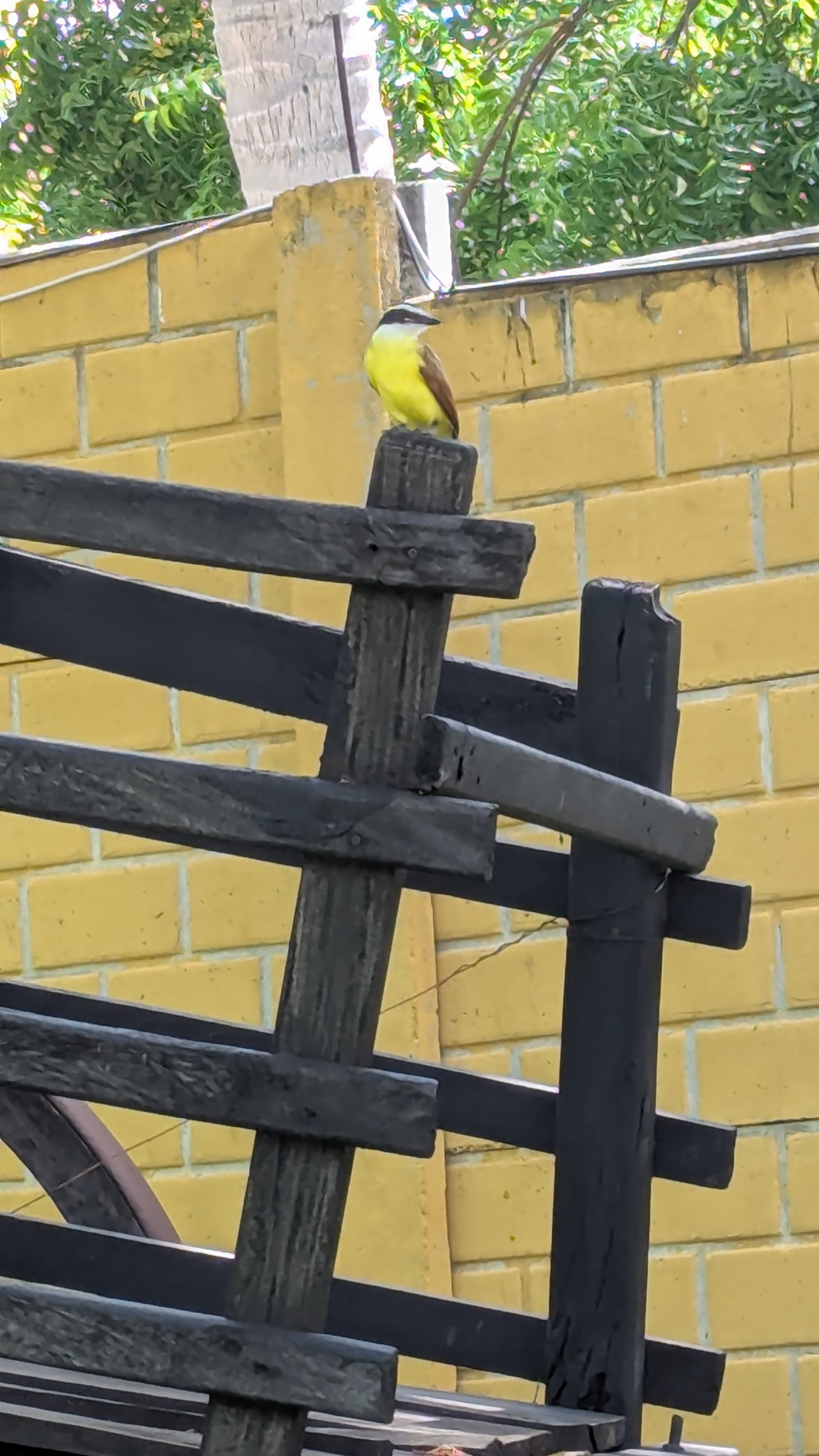
Great kiskadee seen in La Libertad, El Salvador
