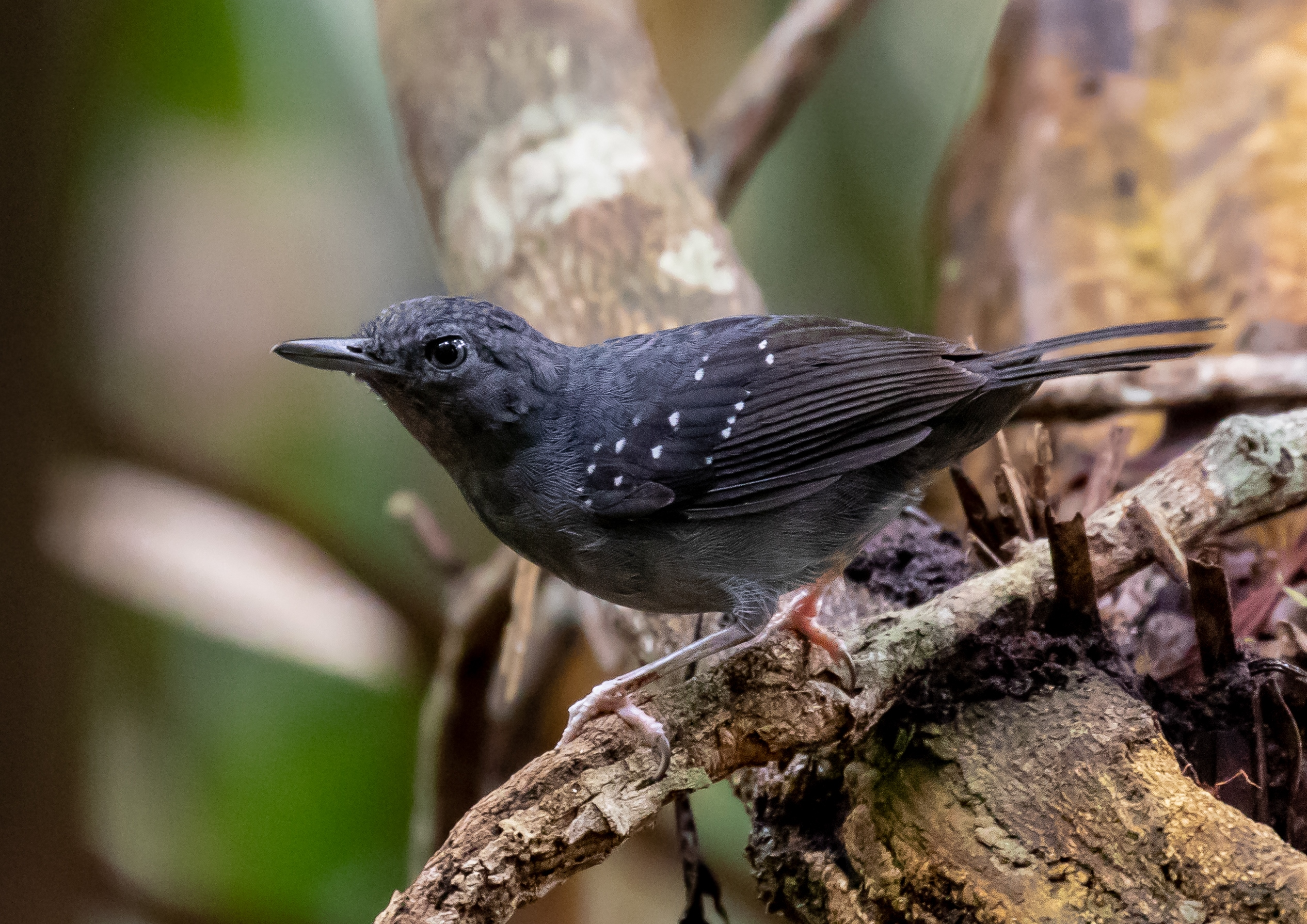
- Male at Careiro, Amazonas state, Brazil
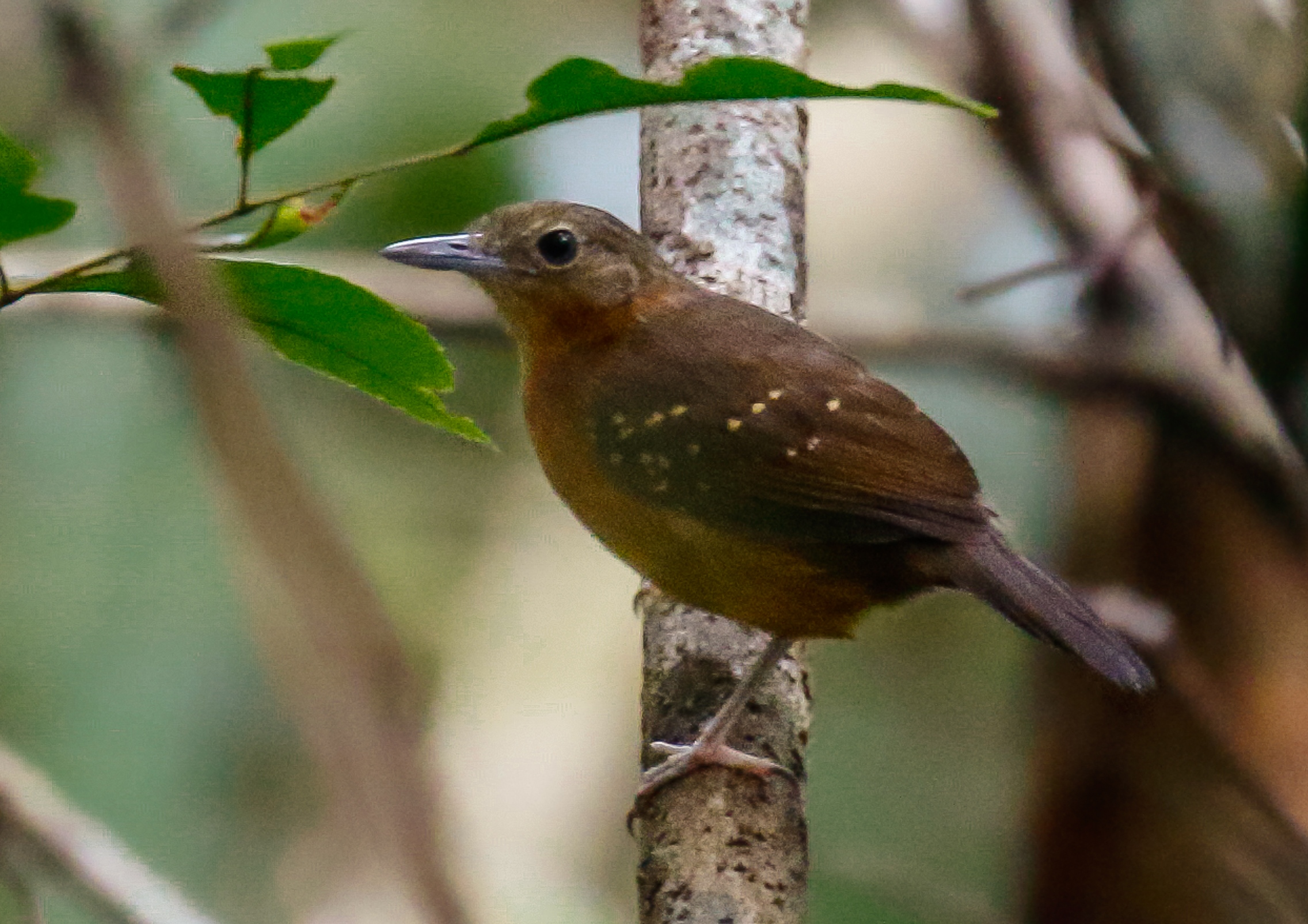
- Female at Careiro, Amazonas state, Brazil

Conservation status
- Least Concern (IUCN 3.1)

Scientific classification
- Kingdom: Animalia
- Phylum: Chordata
- Class: Aves
- Order: Passeriformes
- Family: Thamnophilidae
- Genus: Myrmelastes
- Species: M. humaythae

Binomial name
- Myrmelastes humaythae (Hellmayr, 1907)

Synonyms
- Sclateria schistacea humaythae; Percnostola humaythae; Schistocichla leucostigma humaythae; Schistocichla humaythae

= Humaita antbird =

Species of bird

The Humaita antbird (Myrmelastes humaythae) is a species of passerine bird in subfamily Thamnophilinae of family Thamnophilidae, the "typical antbirds". It is found in Brazil, Bolivia, and Peru.

== Taxonomy and systematics ==
The Humaita antbird has a complicated taxonomic history. It was described by Carl Eduard Hellmayr as Sclateria schistacea humaythae, a subspecies of the slate-colored antbird (now M. schistaceus). Later authors placed it as a subspecies of the spot-winged antbird (now M. leucostigma), which was successively placed in genera Percnostola and Schistocichla. A 2007 study of the vocal characteristics of the then many subspecies of the spot-winged found significant differences between the taxa. Based on this evidence the Humaita antbird was promoted to species status and given its English name. A 2013 study finalized its move to genus Myrmelastes.

The Humaita antbird is monotypic.

== Description ==
The Humaita antbird is 14 to 16 cm (5.5 to 6.3 in) long. Males have medium gray upperparts with an olive-brown tinge. Their wings and tail are blackish gray with wide white tips on the wing coverts. Their throat and underparts are paler gray. Females have a brown crown and upperparts. Their wings and tail are blackish brown with pale cinnamon-rufous tips on the wing coverts. Their face is gray. Their throat and belly are pale tawny and their flanks and undertail coverts olive-brown. Both sexes have pink legs and feet.

== Distribution and habitat ==
The Humaita antbird is found in western Amazonian Brazil, the eastern part of the Department of Madre de Dios in southeastern Peru, and in Pando Department in far northern Bolivia. In Brazil it occurs north of the Amazon between the lower Japurá and lower Negro rivers and south of the Amazon east to the Madeira River. It primarily inhabits the floor and understorey of terra firem evergreen forest. Within the forest it favors poorly drained areas and areas along small watercourses.

== Behavior ==
=== Movement ===
The Humaita antbird is believed to be a year-round resident throughout its range.

=== Feeding ===
The Humaita antbird's diet and foraging behavior are not known but are assumed to be very similar or identical to those of its former "parent" the spot-winged antbird, which see here.

=== Breeding ===
Nothing is known about the Humaita antbird's breeding biology.

=== Vocalization ===
The Humaita antbird's song is a long trill that rises in pitch from start to finish and whose pace increases at the beginning, is steady in the middle, and decreases towards the end. The species' calls apparently are the same as those of the spot-winged antbird, which include a "long, downslurred, typically frequency-modulated whistle", an "abrupt unclear note given singly or in series of 2–5", and a "short rattle".

== Status ==
The IUCN has assessed the Humaita antbird as being of Least Concern. It has a large range; its population size is not known and is believed to be stable. No immediate threats have been identified. It is considered uncommon in most of its range. It occurs in Brazil's Humaitá Reserve, and its range also includes "extensive areas of intact habitat which are not formally protected, but seem unlikely to be threatened by development in the near future".
