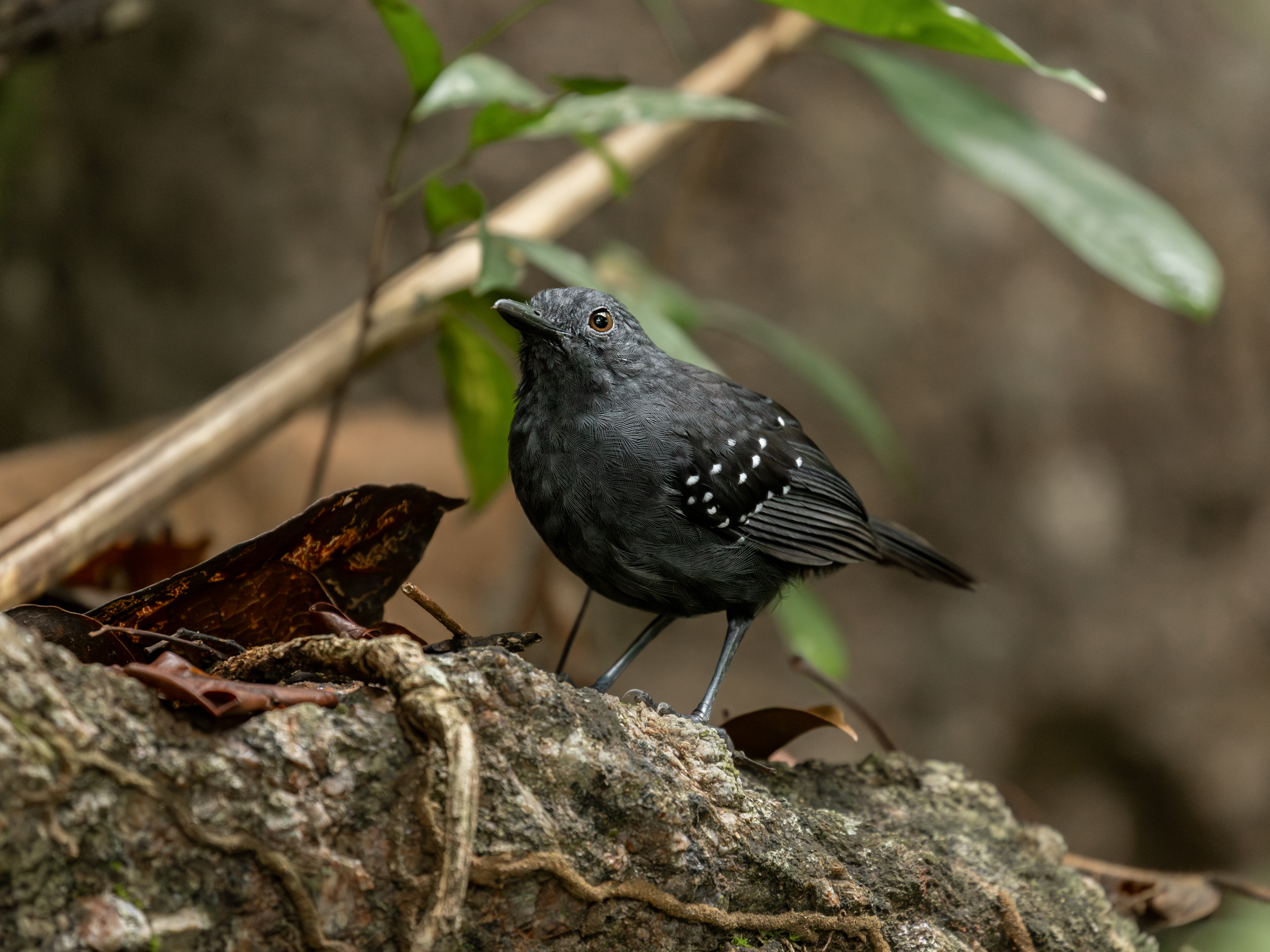
- Male, Mucajai, Roraima, Brazil

Conservation status
- Least Concern (IUCN 3.1)

Scientific classification
- Kingdom: Animalia
- Phylum: Chordata
- Class: Aves
- Order: Passeriformes
- Family: Thamnophilidae
- Genus: Myrmelastes
- Species: M. caurensis

Binomial name
- Myrmelastes caurensis (Hellmayr, 1906)

Synonyms
- Sclateria schistacea caurensis; Sclateria caurensis; Percnostola caurensis; Schistocichla caurensis

= Caura antbird =

Species of bird

The Caura antbird (Myrmelastes caurensis) is a species of bird in subfamily Thamnophilinae of family Thamnophilidae, the "typical antbirds". It is found in Brazil and Venezuela.

== Taxonomy and systematics ==
The Caura antbird has a complicated taxonomic history. It was described as Sclateria schistacea caurensis, a subspecies of the slate-colored antbird (now M. schistaceus). A 1924 publication listed it as a separate species, Sclateria caurensis. It was later placed in genera Schistocichla and Percnostola. A 2013 study finalized its move to genus Myrmelastes.

The Caura antbird has two subspecies, the nominate M. c. caurensis (Hellmayr, 1906) and M. c. australis (Zimmer, JT & Phelps, WH, 1947).

== Description ==
The Caura antbird is 18 to 19 cm (7.1 to 7.5 in) long and weighs about 39 g (1.4 oz). Males of the nominate subspecies are mostly slate gray. Their upperparts have a slight brown tinge and their wing coverts have white tips. Their iris is deep red. Females have a mostly dark gray head with paler, brown tinged, feather centers. Their upperparts and wings are dark reddish yellow-brown with wide cinnamon-rufous tips on the wing coverts. Their tail is blackish gray. Their underparts are mostly deep rufous that is browner on their flanks and crissum. Their iris is dark brown. Males of subspecies M. c. australis have pale edges on their crown feathers and no brown tinge on their upperparts. Females are paler overall than the nominate and have a blackish brown crown.

== Distribution and habitat ==
The Caura antbird's nominate subspecies is found in western Bolívar and northern Amazonas states of southern Venezuela. Subspecies M. c. australis is found in southern Amazonas in Venezuela and very slightly into adjoining Roraima state in Brazil. It inhabits the floor and understorey of humid evergreen and semi-deciduous forest in foothills and on lower slopes of tepuis. It favors areas with large moss- and fern-covered boulders and outcrops and a fairly open understorey. In elevation it reaches 1,500 m (4,900 ft).

== Behavior ==
=== Movement ===
The Caura antbird is believed to be a year-round resident throughout its range.

=== Feeding ===
The Caura antbird's diet has not been detailed but is known to be mostly insects and probably also includes spiders. It forages as individuals, pairs, and small family groups and mostly on the ground though also up to several meters above it. It hops along the ground and takes prey mostly by tossing leaf litter. It also creeps along rock faces and into crevices to glean prey. It is not known to join mixed-species feeding flocks or to attend army ant swarms.

=== Breeding ===
The Caura antbird's breeding season appears to include February but nothing else is known about the species' breeding biology.

=== Vocalization ===
The Caura antbird's song is "a slow [series] of shrill, slightly buzzy notes (strongly modulated), JEEP..JEEP, JEET, JEET-jee-jee-jit-jit-jaa-jaa, descending throughout". It also makes a "variety of snarls, jeea and jeer, and rough chattering plee-ap" calls.

== Status ==
The IUCN has assessed the Caura antbird as being of Least Concern. Its population size is not known and is believed to be decreasing. No immediate threats have been identified. It is considered fairly common but only in very local areas. "Localities where it has been found are in remote regions of Bolívar and Amazonas states, where human populations and development are low. Gold-mining operations represent the primary environmental threat in this region."
