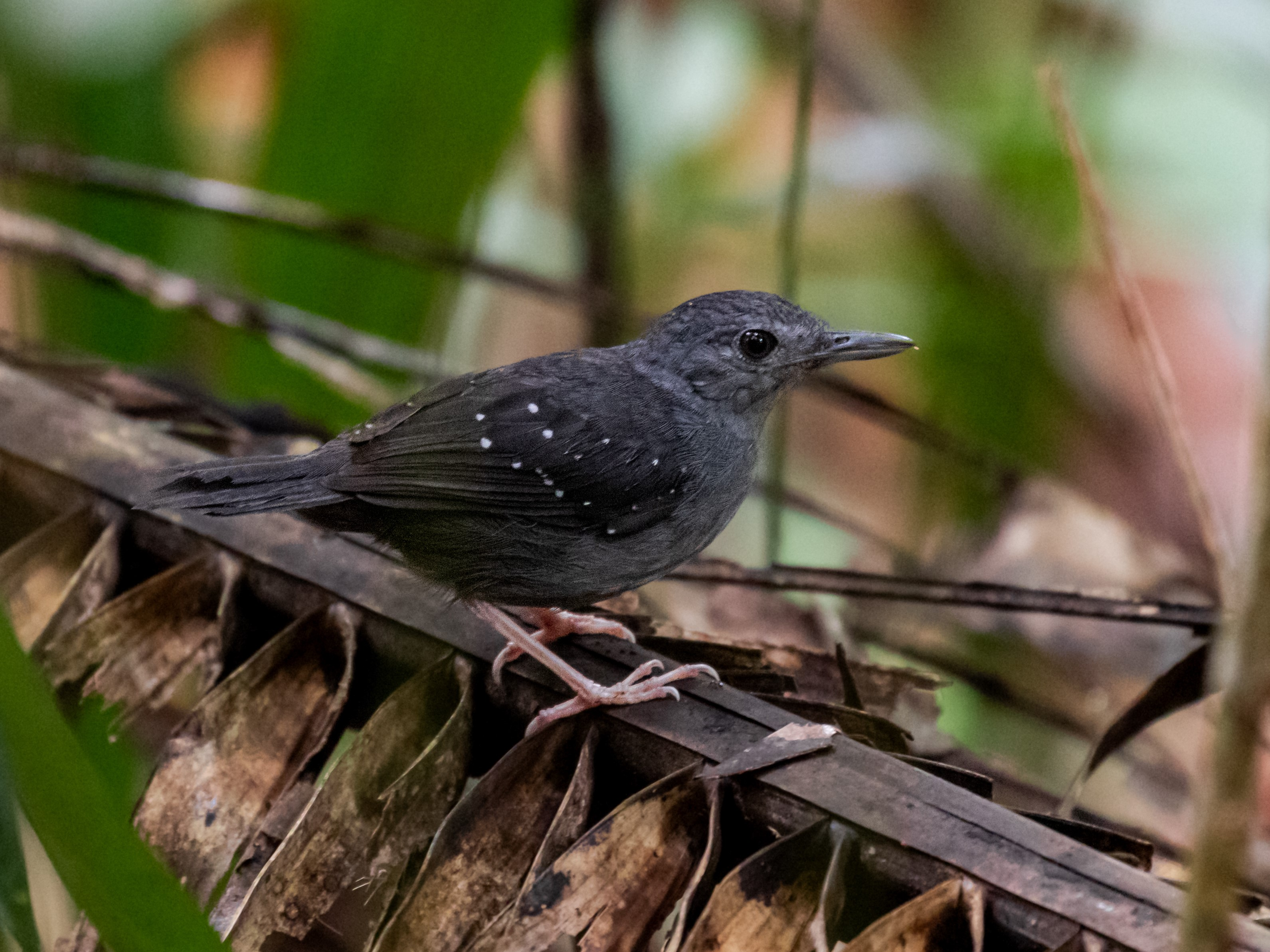
- Male
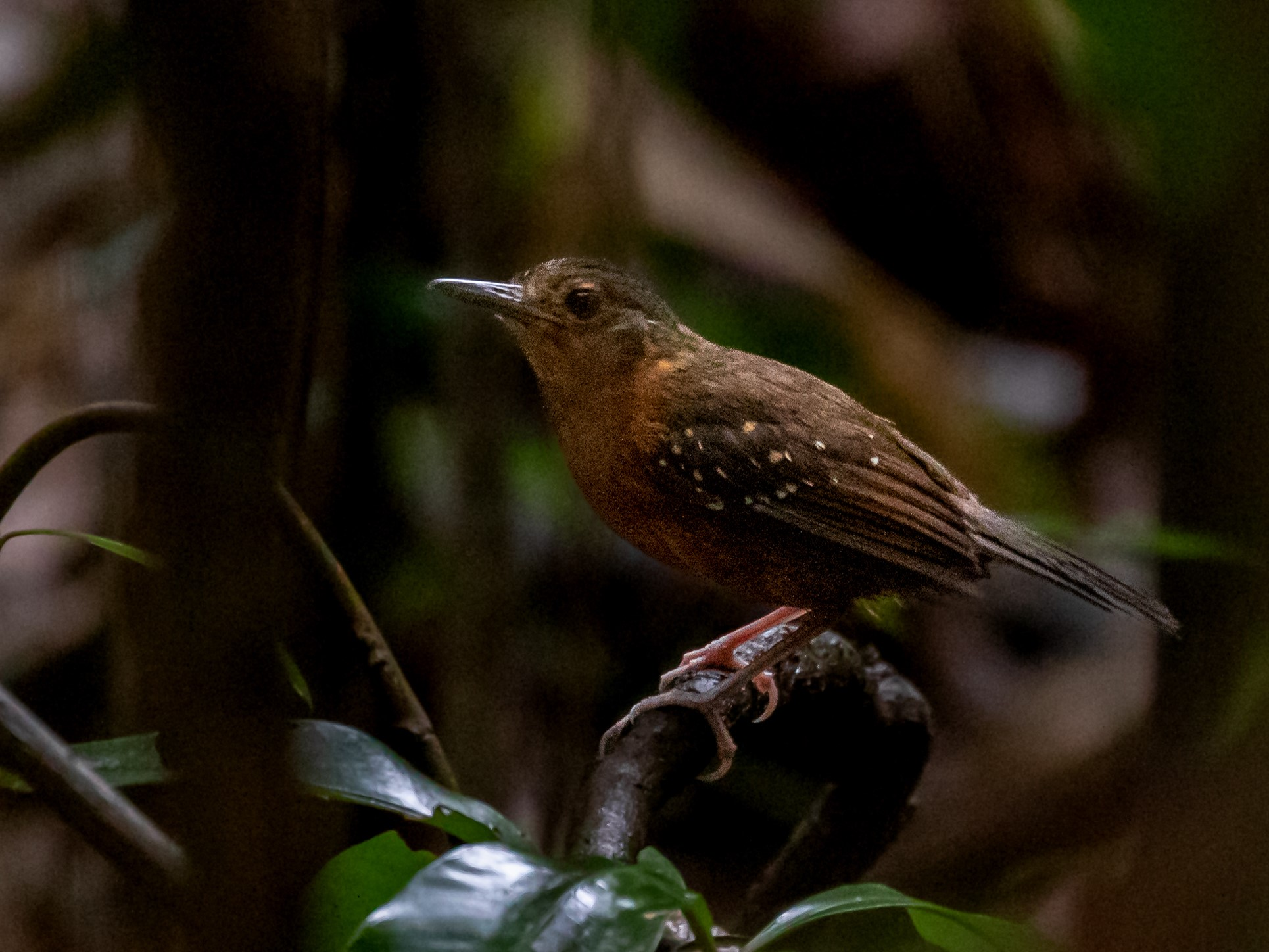
- Female

Conservation status
- Least Concern (IUCN 3.1)

Scientific classification
- Kingdom: Animalia
- Phylum: Chordata
- Class: Aves
- Order: Passeriformes
- Family: Thamnophilidae
- Genus: Myrmelastes
- Species: M. rufifacies

Binomial name
- Myrmelastes rufifacies (Hellmayr, 1929)

Synonyms
- Percnostola rufifacies; Schistocichla leucostigma rufifacies; Schistocichla rufifacies

= Rufous-faced antbird =

Species of bird

The rufous-faced antbird (Myrmelastes rufifacies) is a species of bird in subfamily Thamnophilinae of family Thamnophilidae, the "typical antbirds". It is endemic to Brazil.

== Taxonomy and systematics ==
The rufous-faced antbird has a complicated taxonomic history. It was previously considered as a subspecies of the spot-winged antbird (now M. leucostigma), which at times had been placed in genera Percnostola and Schistocichla. A 2007 study of the vocal characteristics of the then many subspecies of the spot-winged found significant differences between the taxa. Based on this evidence the brownish-headed antbird was promoted to species status and given its English name. A 2013 study finalized its move to genus Myrmelastes.

The fufous-faced antbird is monotypic.

== Description ==
The rufous-faced antbird is 14 to 16 cm (5.5 to 6.3 in) long and weighs 21 to 26 g (0.74 to 0.92 oz). Males have medium gray upperparts with an olive-brown tinge. Their wings and tail are blackish gray with wide white tips on the wing coverts. Their throat and underparts are medium gray with an olive-brown tinge to their sides, flanks, and crissum. Females have a gray-brown crown and upperparts. Their wings and tail are blackish brown with pale cinnamon-rufous tips on the wing coverts. Their face is rufous. Their throat and belly are pale tawny that gently becomes olive-brown on their flanks and undertail coverts. Both sexes have pinkish legs and feet.

== Distribution and habitat ==
The rufous-faced antbird is found in the central Amazon Basin south of the Amazon between the Madeira and Tocantins rivers and south into northern Rondônia and far northern Mato Grosso states. It primarily inhabits the floor and understorey of terra firme evergreen forest. It occasionally also occurs in seasonally flooded forest. Within the forest it favors poorly drained areas and areas along small watercourses. In elevation it mostly occurs below 500 m (1,600 ft) though it is found locally up to about 800 m (2,600 ft).

== Behavior ==
=== Movement ===
The rufous-faced antbird is believed to be a year-round resident throughout its range.

=== Feeding ===
The rufous-faced antbird feeds primarily on insects; its diet also includes arachnids. Its foraging behavior is not known but is assumed to be very similar or identical to those of its former "parent" the spot-winged antbird, which see here.

=== Breeding ===
Nothing is known about the rufous-faced antbird's breeding biology.

=== Vocalization ===
The rufous-faced antbird's song is described as most similar to that of the Roraiman antbird (M. saturatus), a "series of slowly starting, accelerating notes, sharply lowered in pitch at end". With one exception the species' calls apparently are the same as those of the spot-winged antbird, which include a "long, downslurred, typically frequency-modulated whistle", an "abrupt unclear note given singly or in series of 2–5", and a "short rattle". The exception is a variation of the downslurred whistle ("teeeeur") in which it is repeated in a series, and which is not known from others of the spot-winged complex.

== Status ==
The IUCN has assessed the rufous-faced antbird as being of Least Concern. It has a large range; its population size is not known and is believed to be stable. No immediate threats have been identified. It is considered uncommon across its range but occurs in several protected areas. "Regions inhabited by [the] species also encompass extensive areas of intact habitat which are not formally protected, but seem unlikely to be threatened by development in the near future."
