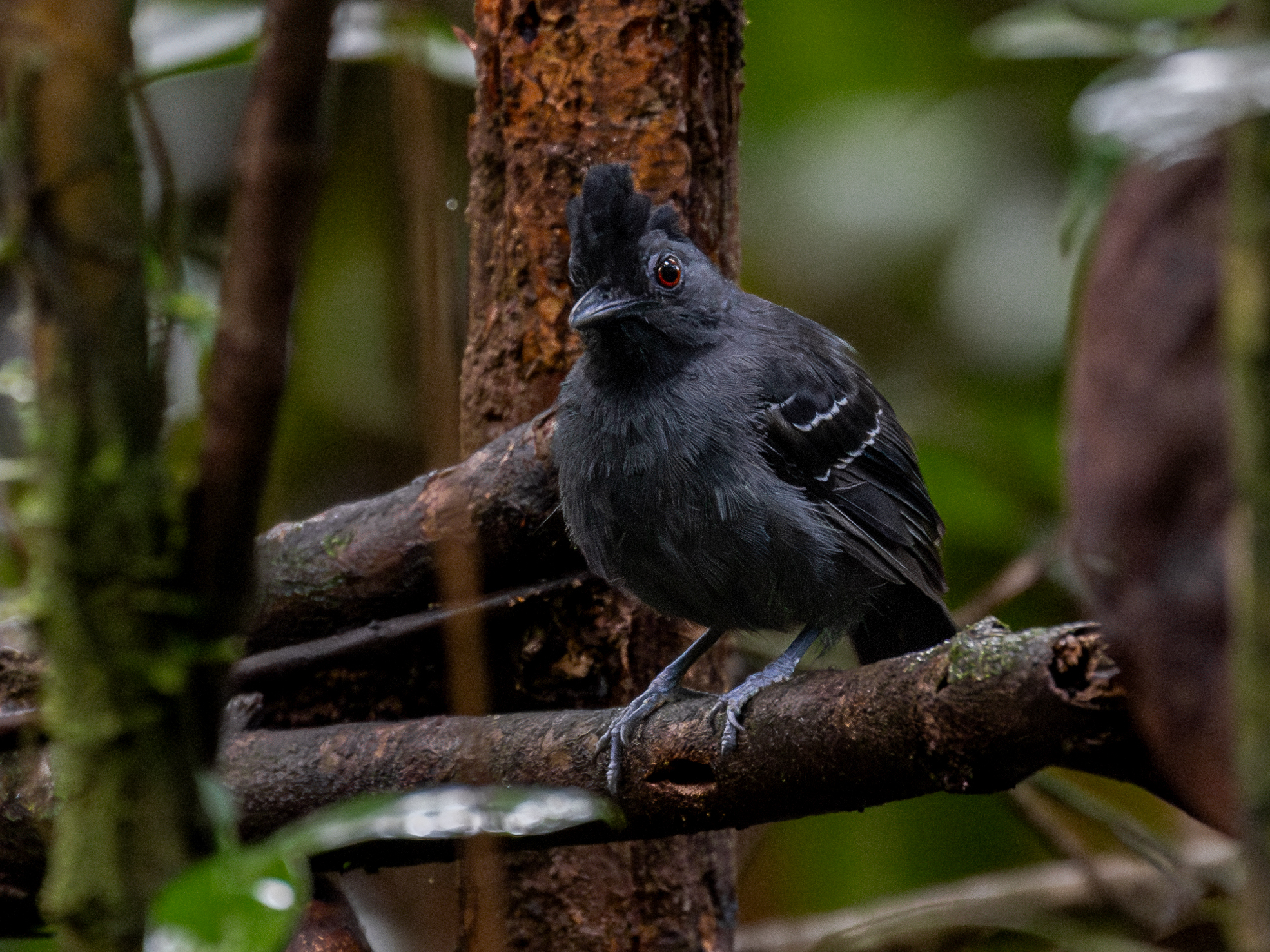

Conservation status
- Least Concern (IUCN 3.1)

Scientific classification
- Kingdom: Animalia
- Phylum: Chordata
- Class: Aves
- Order: Passeriformes
- Family: Thamnophilidae
- Genus: Percnostola
- Species: P. rufifrons

Binomial name
- Percnostola rufifrons (Gmelin, JF, 1789)

= Black-headed antbird =

Species of bird

The black-headed antbird (Percnostola rufifrons) is a species of passerine bird in subfamily Thamnophilinae of family Thamnophilidae, the "typical antbirds". It is found in Brazil, Colombia, French Guiana, Guyana, Peru, Suriname, and Venezuela.

== Taxonomy and systematics ==
The black-headed antbird was formally described in 1789 by the German naturalist Johann Friedrich Gmelin in his revised and expanded edition of Carl Linnaeus's Systema Naturae. He placed it with the thrushes in the genus Turdus and coined the binomial name Turdus rufifrons. The specific epithet rufifrons combines the Latin rufus meaning "red" or "rufous" with frons meaning "forehead" or "front". Gmelin based his description on "Le merle roux de Cayenne" that had been described and illustrated in 1775 by the French polymath the Comte de Buffon in his book Histoire Naturelle des Oiseaux.

The black-headed antbird is now placed together with the Allpahuayo antbird (P. arenarum) in genus Percnostola that was introduced in 1860 by Jean Cabanis and Ferdinand Heine. The white-lined antbird (Myrmoborus lophotes) was originally placed in Percnostola but following a 2013 study was moved to its present genus.

The black-headed antbird has these four subspecies:

- P. r. rufifrons (Gmelin, JF, 1789)
- P. r. subcristata Hellmayr, 1908
- P. r. minor Pelzeln, 1868
- P. r. jensoni Capparella, Rosenberg, GH, & Cardiff, 1997

Capparella et al. suggested that P. r. minor (with P. r. jensoni) should be treated as a species but this view has not gained worldwide support. The Clements taxonomy does group the two pairs of subspecies within the single species.

== Description ==
The black-headed antbird is 13 to 15.5 cm (5.1 to 6.1 in) long and weighs 21 to 32 g (0.74 to 1.1 oz). Adult males of the nominate subspecies P. r. rufifrons are mostly gray, with black crown, short crest, and throat. Their wings and tail are blackish gray with white tips on their wing coverts and gray underwing coverts. Adult females have a black crown and grayish olive-brown upperparts, wings, and tail. Their flight feathers have thin rufous edges and their wing coverts are black with pale cinnamon-rufous tips. Their forehead, face, throat, and underparts are mostly cinnamon-rufous with an olive tinge on their flanks and crissum. Both sexes have a red iris. Subadult males have patches of cinnamon-rufous on their wings and belly but are otherwise like adults.

Males of subspecies P. r. subcristata are like the nominate. Females have a dark chestnut crown with dark grayish brown edges on the feathers. Subspecies P. r. minor is smaller than the nominate. Males do not have a crest and their crown feathers have gray edges. Females have a rufous-brown crest with dark grayish brown feather edges, gray-brown edges on their flight feathers, and paler underparts than the nominate with a yellow-ochre center to their belly and dark olive flanks. Both sexes have a gray iris. Subspecies P. r. jensoni also has a gray iris. Males are like minor males but with wider and paler gray edges on their crown feathers. Females have a black crest with gray feather edges, a dark olive-gray face, a whitish throat, and paler and more uniform underparts than minor.

== Distribution and habitat ==
The black-headed antbird has a disjunct distribution within the Amazon Basin. Subspecies P. r. rufifrons is found from eastern and southern Guyana east through Suriname and French Guiana, in northern Brazil from the Trombetas River to the Atlantic in Amapá, and south into northeastern Roraima. P. r. subcristata is found in Brazil north of the Amazon from the lower Negro River to the Trombetas. P. r. minor is found separately, in eastern Colombia, Amazonas state in southwestern Venezuela, and northwestern Brazil east to the middle Negro River and south to the north bank of the Içá River. P. r. jensoni is widely separated from the other subspecies, found in northeastern Peru's Department of Loreto.

The subspecies of the black-headed antbird differ somewhat in their habitats, but in general they occur in lowland and foothill terra firme evergreen forest and mature secondary woodland. In all areas they favor dense thickets, shrubby forest edges, and densely vegetated forest openings like those caused by fallen trees. Subspecies P. r. rufifrons also occurs in savanna forest on the coastal plain of the Guianas, in mangroves in French Guiana, and locally in seasonally flooded forest in Brazil. In addition to evergreen forest, P. r. subcristata also occurs in forest on laterite and sandy soils. P. r. minor and P. r. jensoni also include sandy-soil forest as part of their habitats. In elevation the species reaches 350 m (1,100 ft) in Venezuela and 300 m (1,000 ft) in Colombia.

== Behavior ==
=== Movement ===
The black-headed antbird is believed to be a year-round resident throughout its range.

=== Feeding ===
The black-headed antbird feeds on a wide variety of insects and other arthropods and occasionally also on small reptiles and fruit. It typically forages singly, in pairs, or in family groups in dense vegetation, mostly on the ground and within about 2 m (7 ft) above it. It hops between short feeding stops, pumping its tail. It captures prey by gleaning, reaching, jumping (upward and to the ground), lunging from a perch, and by searching leaf litter. Less frequently it makes short sallies to glean. It regularly follows army ant swarms to capture prey fleeing the ants; at the swarms it is subordinate to obligate ant-followers. It seldom joins mixed-species feeding flocks.

=== Breeding ===
The black-headed antbird's breeding season varies geographically, spanning August to March in French Guiana and October to August in northwestern Brazil. In northeastern Brazil it includes June. Its nest varies somewhat across its range but in general is a ball or dome made mostly of dead leaves on the ground or only slightly above it. The usual clutch size appears to be two eggs though single eggs are known. Eggs of the nominate subspecies are creamy white with many dark brown speckles and blotches. Both parents brood and feed young, though each appears to separately tend one of the typical two. The incubation period, time to fledging, and other details of parental care are not known.

=== Vocalization ===
The black-headed antbird's song in Brazil is a "high, calm, decelerating series of loud sharp 'tieew' notes". It is described as "a loud, whistled pa, peer-peer-peer-peer-peer-pear-pear" in Venezuela and in Peru as "a moderate-paced series of monotone whistles with a stuttered, higher-pitched introductory whistle: hee'hee hew hew hew hew". Its calls include a "short, somewhat screeching note", a "longer (e.g. 0·35 seconds) complaining, downslurred note", and a "short rattle".

== Status ==
The IUCN has assessed the black-headed antbird as being of Least Concern. It has a large range; its population size is not known and is believed to be stable. No immediate threats have been identified. Except for subspecies P. r. jensoni it is considered uncommon in Colombia, fairly common in Venezuela, and locally uncommon to fairly common elsewhere. The ranges of those three subspecies include substantial protected areas. In Peru P. r. jensoni is considered very local which "suggests that it is patchily distributed within its small range, placing it at greater potential risk from habitat destruction than are other races".
