= Brownish-headed antbird =

Conservation status
- Least Concern (IUCN 3.1)

Scientific classification
- Kingdom: Animalia
- Phylum: Chordata
- Class: Aves
- Order: Passeriformes
- Family: Thamnophilidae
- Genus: Myrmelastes
- Species: M. brunneiceps

Binomial name
- Myrmelastes brunneiceps (Zimmer, 1931)

Synonyms
- Schistocichla leucostigma brunneiceps; Percnostola brunneiceps; Schistocichla brunneiceps

Species of bird

The brownish-headed antbird (Myrmelastes brunneiceps) is a species of passerine bird in subfamily Thamnophilinae of family Thamnophilidae, the "typical antbirds". It is found in Bolivia and Peru.

== Taxonomy and systematics ==
The brownish-headed antbird has a complicated taxonomic history. It was described by John T. Zimmer as Schistocichla leucostigma brunneiceps, a subspecies of the spot-winged antbird (now M. leucostigma). Later authors placed it in genus Percnostola. A 2007 study of the vocal characteristics of the then many subspecies of the spot-winged found significant differences between the taxa. Based on this evidence the brownish-headed antbird was promoted to species status and given its English name. A 2013 study finalized its move to genus Myrmelastes.

The brownish-headed antbird is monotypic.

== Description ==
The brownish-headed antbird is 14 to 16 cm (5.5 to 6.3 in) long. Males have dark gray upperparts. Their wings and tail are blackish gray with wide white tips on the wing coverts. Their throat and underparts are medium gray. Females have a dark brown crown and face. Their upperparts are olive-brown. Their wings and tail are blackish brown with pale cinnamon-rufous tips on the wing coverts. Their throat and belly are dark tawny and their flanks and undertail coverts olive-brown.

== Distribution and habitat ==
The brownish-headed antbird is found in the southeastern Peruvian departments of Cuzco, Madre de Dios, and Puno and in west-central La Paz Department in far west-central Bolivia. It primarily inhabits the floor and understorey of terra firme evergreen forest. Within the forest it favors poorly drained areas and areas along small watercourses. In elevation it occurs as high as about 1,400 m (4,600 ft).

== Behavior ==
=== Movement ===
The brownish-headed antbird is believed to be a year-round resident throughout its range.

=== Feeding ===
The brownish-headed antbird's diet and foraging behavior are not known but are assumed to be very similar or identical to those of its former "parent" the spot-winged antbird, which see here.

=== Breeding ===
The brownish-headed antbird's nest is a deep open bag slung between supports. The clutch size is two eggs which are whitish with heavy dark mauve to purplish brown markings. Nothing else is known about the species' breeding biology.

=== Vocalization ===
The brownish-headed antbird's song is "a rapid, accelerating, series of high ringing notes: tee tee-ti-ti-ti'ti'ti'i'i'I'I'I'i'i'i'i'i'i'ew". The species' calls apparently are the same as those of the spot-winged antbird, which include a "long, downslurred, typically frequency-modulated whistle", an "abrupt unclear note given singly or in series of 2–5", and a "short rattle".

== Status ==
The IUCN has assessed the brownish-headed antbird as being of Least Concern. Its population size is not known and is believed to be stable. No immediate threats have been identified. It is considered uncommon across most of its range, which includes several protected areas. "Regions inhabited by species also encompass extensive areas of intact habitat which are not formally protected, but seem unlikely to be threatened by development in the near future."
