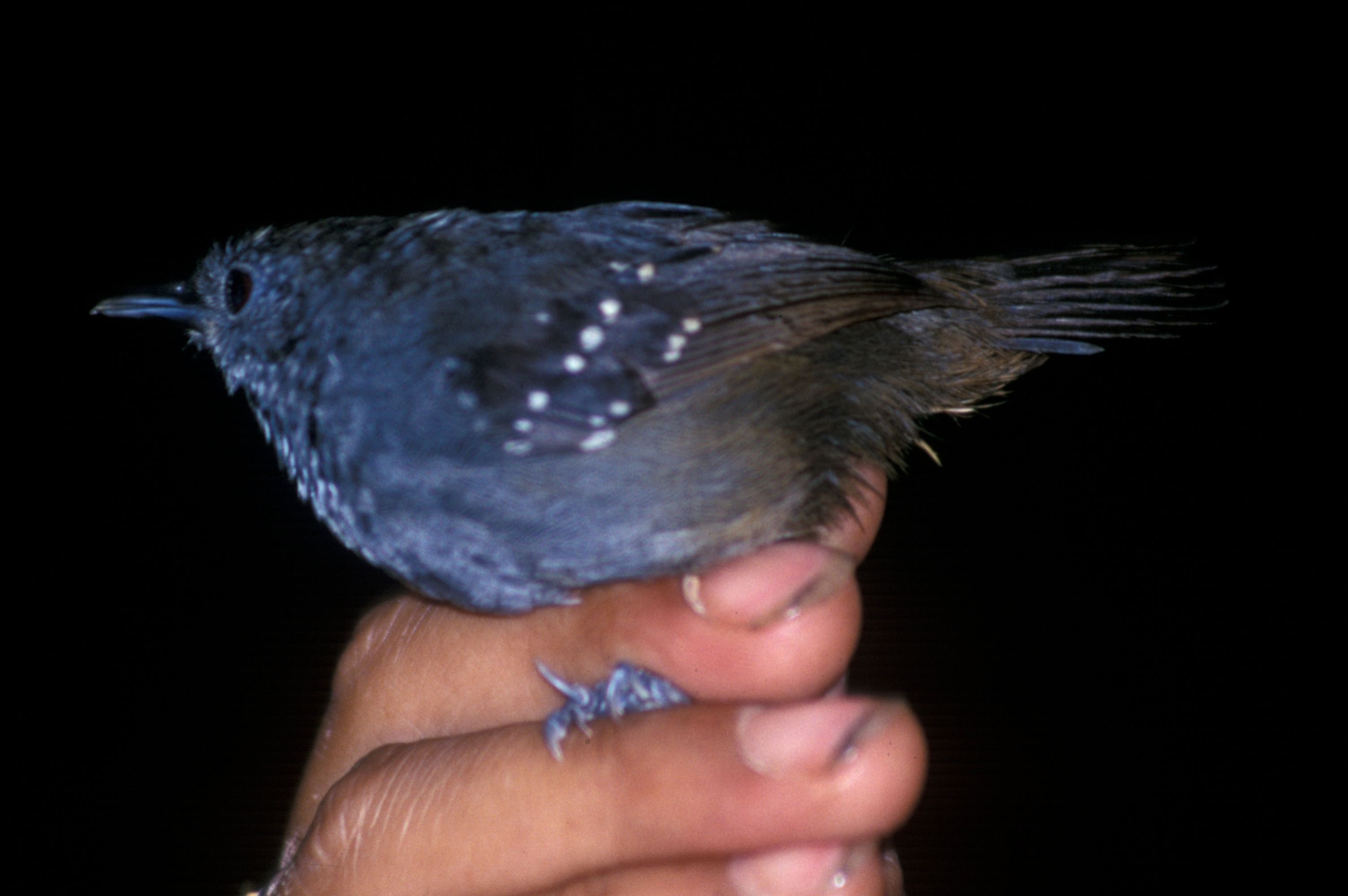

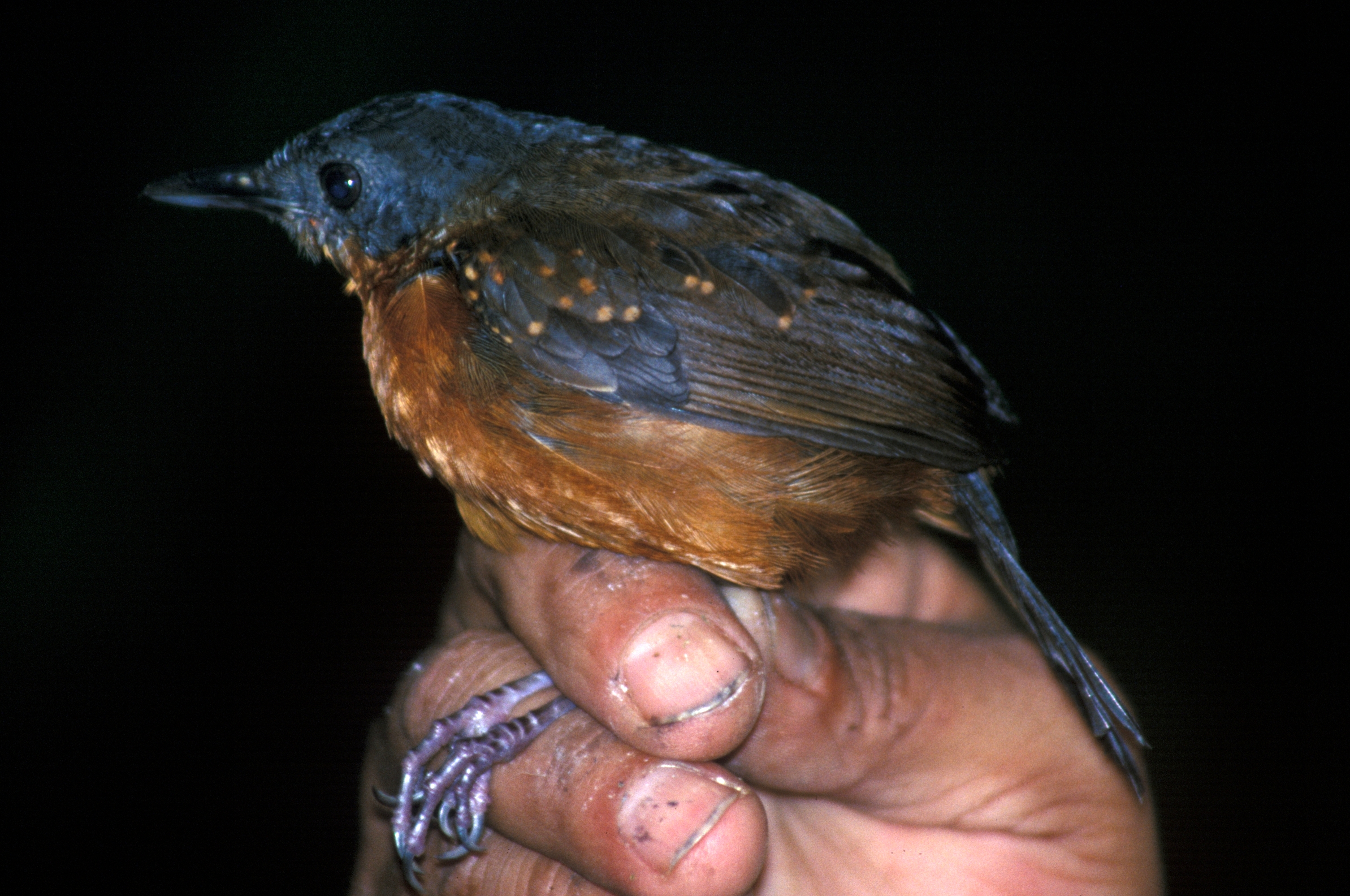
- Male (above) and female (below)

Conservation status
- Least Concern (IUCN 3.1)

Scientific classification
- Kingdom: Animalia
- Phylum: Chordata
- Class: Aves
- Order: Passeriformes
- Family: Thamnophilidae
- Genus: Myrmelastes
- Species: M. leucostigma

Binomial name
- Myrmelastes leucostigma (Pelzeln, 1868)

Synonyms
- Percnostola leucostigma; Schistocichla leucostigma

= Spot-winged antbird =

Species of bird

Schistocichla leucostigma - Spot-winged Antbird

The spot-winged antbird (Myrmelastes leucostigma) is a species of bird in subfamily Thamnophilinae of family Thamnophilidae, the "typical antbirds". It is found in Brazil, Colombia, Ecuador, French Guiana, Guyana, Peru, Suriname, and Venezuela.

== Taxonomy and systematics ==
The spot-winged antbird has a complicated taxonomic history. It was described by the Austrian ornithologist August von Pelzeln in 1868 and given the binomial name Percnostola leucostigma. Later authors placed it successively in genera Sclateria and Schistocichla. A 2013 study finalized its move to genus Myrmelastes.

As of 2024, the spot-winged antbird had these four subspecies:

- M. l. subplumbeus (Sclater, PL & Salvin, 1880)
- M. l. leucostigma (Pelzeln, 1868)
- M. l. intensus (Zimmer, JT, 1927)
- M. l. infuscatus (Todd, 1927)

What are now the Humaita antbird (M. humaythae), brownish-headed antbird (M. brunneiceps), rufous-faced antbird (M. rufifacies), and Roraiman antbird (M. saturatus) were formerly treated as additional subspecies. They were separated from the spot-winged and each other primarily because of their very different vocalizations.

== Description ==
The spot-winged antbird is 14 to 16 cm (5.5 to 6.3 in) long and weighs 20 to 28.5 g (0.71 to 1.0 oz). Males of the nominate subspecies M. l. leucostigma have dark gray upperparts. Their wings and tail are blackish gray with wide white tips on the wing coverts. Their face, throat, and underparts are pale gray to gray; their sides and belly are the darker parts. Females have a dark gray crown and dark cinnamon-brown upperparts. Their wings and tail are blackish brown with pale cinnamon-rufous tips on the wing coverts. Their face is gray. Their throat and belly are pale tawny and their flanks and undertail coverts olive-brown. Both sexes have pinkish legs and feet.

Males of subspecies M. l. subplumbeus have underparts almost as dark as their upperparts and smaller white tips on their wing coverts than the nominate. Females' throat and underparts are rufous-brown. Both sexes have bluish gray legs and feet. Males of M. l. intensus are similar to subplumbeus males but overall darker. Females have a blackish crown and deep brown upperparts. Males of M. l. infuscatus is similar to the nominate but with smaller spots on the wing coverts. Females have a brownish olive face. Both sexes have bluish gray legs and feet.

== Distribution and habitat ==
The subspecies of the spot-winged antbird are found thus:

- M. l. subplumbeus: southwestern Táchira state in extreme western Venezuela south along the eastern base of the Andes through Colombia and Ecuador into northeastern Peru as far as southern Department of Loreto and east just into western Brazil's Amazonas and Acre states
- M. l. leucostigma: from extreme eastern Bolívar state in eastern Venezuela east through the Guianas and northeastern Brazil to the Atlantic in Amapá state
- M. l. intensus: central Peru's Huánuco, Pasco, Junín, and Ucayali departments
- M. l. infuscatus: southwestern Amazonas state in southern Venezuela, eastern Colombia, and northwestern Brazil north of the upper Amazon

Some sources add extreme northwestern Bolivia to the range of intensus but the South American Classification Committee of the American Ornithological Society has no records from that country.

The spot-winged antbird primarily inhabits the floor and understorey of terra firme evergreen forest. Especially at lower elevations, within the forest it favors poorly drained areas and areas along small watercourses. In elevation it reaches 700 m (2,300 ft) in Brazil, 400 m (1,300 ft) in Venezuela, 1,100 m (3,600 ft) in Colombia, and 1,650 m (5,400 ft) in Peru. In Ecuador it mostly occurs below 600 m (2,000 ft) but locally reaches 1,100 m (3,600 ft).

== Behavior ==
=== Movement ===
The spot-winged antbird is believed to be a year-round resident throughout its range.

=== Feeding ===
The spot-winged antbird's diet has not been detailed but is known to be mostly insects and arachnids and also include small lizards. It forages as individuals, pairs, and small family groups and mostly within about 1 m (3 ft) of the ground and only rarely with mixed-species feeding flocks. It hops along the ground and among low branches, and takes prey mostly by picking from leaf litter and by reaching to leaves and twigs from the ground or a low perch. It regularly attends army ant swarms to capture prey disturbed by the ants, though more often forages away from ants.

=== Breeding ===
The spot-winged antbird's breeding season has not been fully defined but apparently includes October in French Guiana, January in Brazil, and February in Venezuela. In Ecuador it appears to span from March to October. Its only known nest was at least partly constructed of small rootlets.

=== Vocalization ===
Subspecies M. l. intensus of the spot-winged antbird sings "a rapid, fairly even-paced series of ringing notes: pi'i'i'i'i'i'I'I'I'i'i'i'i'i'i'i'i". The song's pitch and pace slightly decrease at the end. The other subspecies' songs are similar, mostly differing in how much the song's end changes. The species' calls include a "long, downslurred, typically frequency-modulated whistle", an "abrupt unclear note given singly or in series of 2–5", and a "short rattle".

== Status ==
The IUCN has assessed the spot-winged antbird as being of Least Concern. It has a large range; its population size is not known and is believed to be stable. No immediate threats have been identified. It is considered fairly common in Venezuela, fairly common in Colombia, "scarce" in Ecuador, and fairly common in Peru. Its range includes many protected areas and "[r]egions inhabited by species also encompass extensive areas of intact habitat which are not formally protected, but seem unlikely to be threatened by development in the near future".
