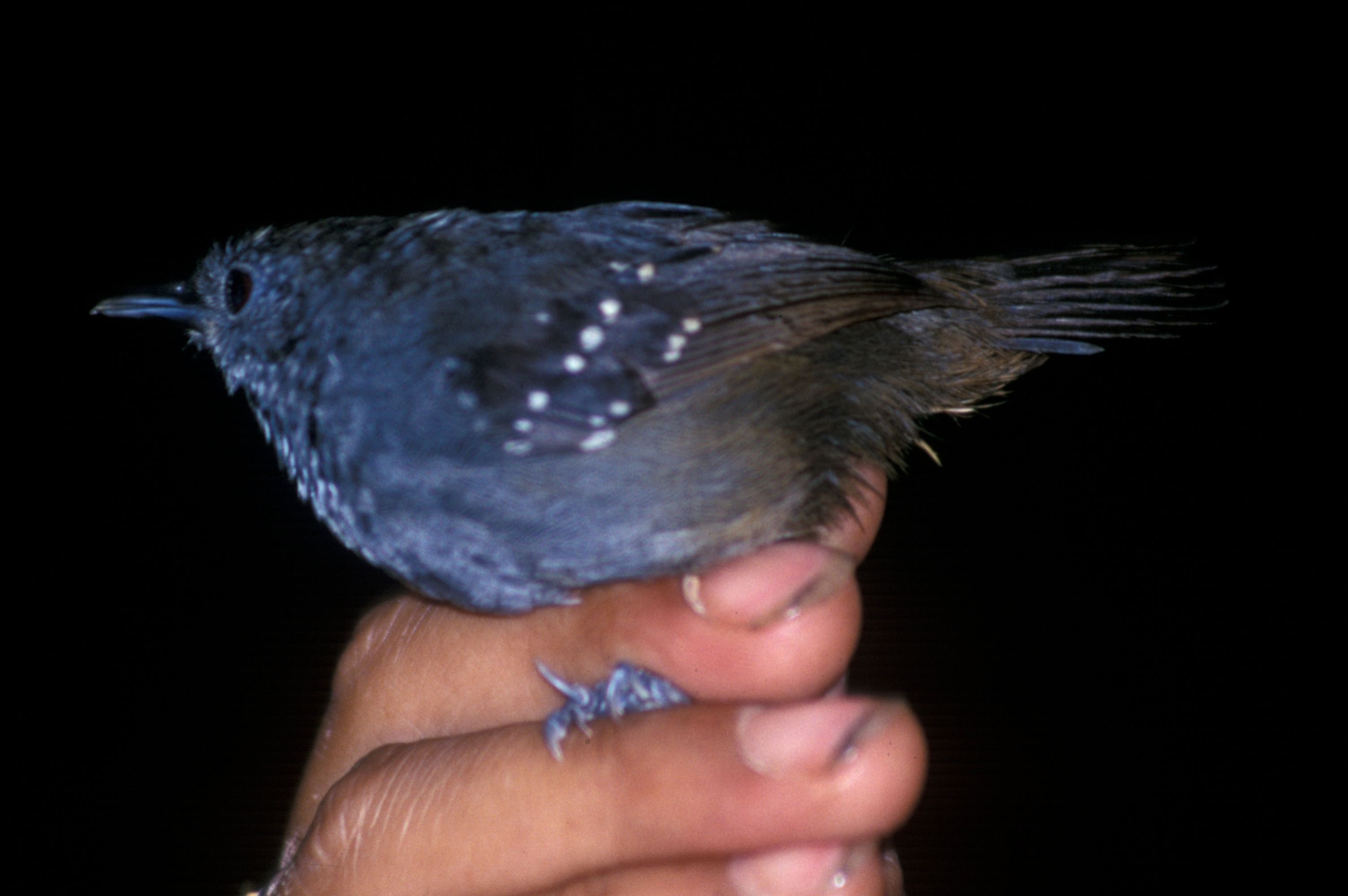
- Spot-winged antbird (Myrmelastes leucostigma)

Scientific classification
- Kingdom: Animalia
- Phylum: Chordata
- Class: Aves
- Order: Passeriformes
- Family: Thamnophilidae
- Genus: Myrmelastes; P.L. Sclater, 1858

Type species
- Thamnophilus plumbeus P.L. Sclater, 1858

Species
- See text

= Myrmelastes =

Genus of birds

Myrmelastes is a genus of passerine birds in the antbird family (Thamnophilidae). The eight recognised species inhabit the understorey of lowland and sub‑montane evergreen forests of the Amazon Basin and the Guiana Shield, from sea level to about 1 200 m. All species regularly follow marching swarms of army‑ants (Eciton spp.), feeding on arthropods flushed by the ants. The generic name, coined by Philip Sclater in 1858, combines the Ancient Greek words for “ant” and “robber.” Molecular data place the genus in the core antbird clade, sister to Hypocnemis. Seven species are currently assessed as Least Concern and one as Near Threatened; nevertheless, progressive deforestation and forest fragmentation are causing local declines .

== Taxonomy and systematics ==
=== Etymology ===
The generic name Myrmelastes combines the Ancient Greek words μυρμηξ (myrmēx, meaning “ant”) and λῇστης (lēstēs, meaning “robber” or “bandit”). The name reflects the birds’ distinctive ecological habit of following swarms of army ants and feeding on arthropods flushed out by the ants' activity. This behavior is among the most specialized foraging strategies in Neotropical avifauna and underlies the ecological identity of the genus.

=== Nomenclatural history ===
The genus Myrmelastes was introduced in 1858 by the British ornithologist Philip Lutley Sclater to accommodate two species but did not specify the type species. In his Latin diagnosis, he highlighted key morphological traits such as the thick, straight bill, strong feet with long toes and a small rounded tail — a set of features still considered diagnostic.

In 1890, Sclater himself designated M. plumbeus as the type species of the genus, confirming its nomenclatural foundation. Subsequently, Myrmelastes was retained by the Austrian ornithologist Carl Eduard Hellmayr in the Catalogue of Birds of the Americas, though closely related genera such as Schistocichla were occasionally treated as separate based on morphological distinctions such as head shape and wing markings. Over the 20th century, however, Myrmelastes fell into disuse as most authors subsumed its members into the broader genus Myrmeciza.

The genus was later revived following advances in phylogenetic studies that clarified the polyphyletic nature of Myrmeciza. Sclater's original diagnosis, once sidelined, regained taxonomic significance in light of congruent genetic and behavioral data.

=== Phylogenetic relationships ===
Modern molecular phylogenetics places Myrmelastes firmly within the core radiation of the antbird family (Thamnophilidae). Mitochondrial cytochrome b and three nuclear gene regions consistently recover Myrmelastes as the sister group to Hypocnemis, a result supported across multiple tree-building methods. This relationship suggests a relatively deep evolutionary split within the tribe Thamnophilini.

A broader multilocus study by Brumfield et al. involving 46 genera indicated that the divergence between Myrmelastes and its sister taxa likely occurred during the late Miocene, a period associated with increased Amazonian diversification due to tectonic uplift and climate fluctuation.

Building upon this foundation, Morton Isler and collaborators carried out a comprehensive revision of the genus Myrmeciza, which had long served as a taxonomic "wastebasket" for many phenotypically similar antbirds. Their integrative approach, combining DNA sequences, vocalizations, plumage patterns, and ecological traits, confirmed that Myrmeciza was polyphyletic. Consequently, they proposed dividing the former genus into 12 monophyletic genera, one of which was Myrmelastes. This revision helped restore evolutionary coherence to antbird classification and better align genera with their natural history attributes.

The taxonomic changes have since been adopted by the International Ornithologists' Union in its IOC World Bird List (Gill et al., 2025) and by global authorities such as Birds of the World (Cornell Lab of Ornithology, 2025).

=== Synonymy ===
The genus Schistocichla, introduced by Ridgway in 1909, was historically used for several Amazonian taxa within what is now considered Myrmelastes. Defining characters such as a rounded head and the absence of crown tufts were once considered sufficient to merit generic separation. However, Isler et al. argued that these features were inconsistently distributed and did not correspond to monophyletic lineages.

Later genetic and vocal analyses confirmed that species assigned to Schistocichla did not form a distinct clade and were better treated within Myrmelastes. As a result, Schistocichla is now treated as a junior synonym of Myrmelastes, and its former members are reassigned accordingly.

== Species ==
The genus contains eight species:

Image	Common name	Scientific name	Distribution	IUCN2024
	Plumbeous antbird	Myrmelastes hyperythrus	W Amazonia (Colombia • Ecuador • Peru)	LC
	Slate-colored antbird	Myrmelastes schistaceus	W Amazonia (Brazil • Peru • Ecuador • Colombia)	LC
	Spot-winged antbird	Myrmelastes leucostigma	SE Amazonia (Brazil)	LC
	Humaita antbird	Myrmelastes humaythae	SW Amazonia (Brazil)	LC
-	Brownish-headed antbird	Myrmelastes brunneiceps	SW Amazonia (Peru • Bolivia)	LC
	Rufous-faced antbird	Myrmelastes rufifacies	S Amazonia (Brazil)	NT
-	Roraiman antbird	Myrmelastes saturatus	Tepui region (Venezuela • Guyana)	LC
-	Caura antbird	Myrmelastes caurensis	S Venezuela → NW Brazil	LC

These species were formerly placed in the genus Schistocichla which had been erected by the American ornithologist W.E. Clyde Todd in 1927 with spot-winged antbird as the type species. A molecular phylogenetic study published in 2013 found that the plumbeous antbird which had previously been placed in the genus Myrmeciza was instead a member of a clade containing species in the genus Schistocichla. The plumbeous antbird was the type species of the genus Myrmelastes which had been introduced by the English zoologist Philip Sclater in 1858. This was much earlier than Schistocichla, Todd 1927, and had precedence.

The Humaita antbird, brownish-headed antbird, rufous-faced antbird and Roraiman antbird were formerly considered as subspecies of the spot-winged antbird. They were promoted to species status based on detailed studies of the plumage and vocal characteristics.

== Morphology and description ==
Adults of the genus Myrmelastes range in body length from approximately 13 to 17 cm and typically weigh between 18 and 27 grams (del Hoyo et al., 2004, p. 699). The overall body plan conforms to the antbird family's typical morphology, with short, rounded wings, a relatively long tail, and robust legs adapted for maneuvering through dense forest undergrowth.

Males are generally slate-grey to blackish in coloration, often with a faint bluish or silvery sheen and limited spotting. Females, in contrast, exhibit warm rufous to cinnamon underparts and darker brown upperparts, resulting in pronounced sexual dimorphism. This sex-based divergence in plumage is consistent across most species in the genus and is considered a diagnostic feature. The bill is straight, heavy, and laterally compressed—an adaptation for gleaning and probing for prey in leaf litter and among bark crevices. The lores (featherless area between the eye and the bill) are usually sparsely feathered, revealing bluish or grey skin, especially in adult males.

Wings are short and rounded, consistent with a lifestyle adapted to maneuverability rather than long-distance flight. The hand wing index, a measure of flight feather proportion relative to wing length, ranges from 23 to 27% in most species (Marcondes & Brumfield, 2020, p. 3), indicating reduced wing aspect ratio and confirming low flight efficiency in favor of forest interior agility.

Plumage variation exists within and between species but is generally subtle. For example, populations west of the Andes tend to have slightly duller or sootier plumage compared to their trans-Andean counterparts, possibly due to environmental or selective pressures related to light penetration and microhabitat structure (Marcondes & Brumfield, 2020, p. 6). In some populations, crown and mantle feathers exhibit faint barring or fringing, though these markings are often only visible at close range.

=== Plumage Variation and Sexual Dimorphism ===
Plumage variation across the genus Myrmelastes is relatively conservative in terms of pattern, yet shows important divergence in hue and saturation correlated with ecological and geographic factors. Males across most species exhibit uniformly dark coloration—ranging from charcoal to blackish-slate—providing camouflage in shaded forest understory. In contrast, females are typically more variable in appearance, with coloration from warm chestnut to reddish brown, likely serving as background matching during nesting or brooding .

This consistent pattern of sexual dichromatism is characteristic of the Thamnophilidae family and is thought to be driven by both sexual selection and ecological partitioning. In Myrmelastes, males tend to be more conspicuous in display contexts, whereas females adopt more cryptic plumage suited to concealment. Nesting females, for example, may benefit from subdued coloration in dense understory habitats where predator avoidance is critical.

Within the genus, morphometric differences such as bill depth, tarsus length, and wing chord are also moderately variable and may reflect adaptations to microhabitat differences or resource partitioning among sympatric species. While no subspecies are currently recognized, individual and population-level variation remains a subject of interest in ongoing phylogeographic studies.

== Ecology and Behavior ==
=== Army-ant-following Behavior ===
Myrmelastes species are regular to obligate army-ant followers, a foraging strategy centered on trailing the large nomadic columns of ants—primarily Eciton burchellii and Labidus praedator—as they raid through the forest litter. These birds exploit the ecological disturbance created by army-ant swarms, feeding on invertebrates and small vertebrates that flee from the advancing ants .

While E. burchellii has traditionally been considered the principal driver of this behavior due to its large swarm size and predictability, recent studies emphasize the underappreciated role of L. praedator, which produces longer-lasting foraging fronts and may increase prey availability and spatial foraging opportunities . In some habitats, especially during seasonal shifts or ant nest relocations, birds may shift allegiance between species of army ants, indicating behavioral flexibility in response to swarm density and movement.

Army-ant following in Myrmelastes represents a highly specialized form of commensalism, sometimes verging on mutualism when the presence of birds helps to concentrate prey in open zones, improving capture efficiency for both taxa. This niche specialization is deeply conserved within the Thamnophilidae family and likely evolved independently multiple times . Birds utilize a complex auditory landscape to detect ant activity and vocal cues from other followers, creating an "information cascade" that leads to multi-species feeding aggregations.

=== Foraging Specialization ===
Although Myrmelastes species broadly share the army-ant-following niche, fine-scale behavioral and morphological differences allow coexistence. For example, the Caura Antbird (M. caurensis) has been documented engaging in ground-foraging strategies uncommon among antbirds, such as flipping over leaf litter and small stones in moist, rocky forests, suggesting a partially independent food-searching capacity. These birds typically inhabit altitudes of 280–400 m and prefer structurally complex understory, often near streambeds or steep slopes.

Body mass differences are a key mechanism for resource partitioning among co-occurring ant-followers. Larger species like Phlegopsis nigromaculata dominate the high-yield core of the ant swarm front, while smaller Myrmelastes species exploit the periphery, reducing direct foraging conflict. This spatial segregation is reinforced by dominance hierarchies and aggressive interactions, which structure the composition and stability of antbird assemblages during swarming events.

=== Territoriality and population dynamics ===
In contrast to many insectivorous forest birds that maintain strongly defended territories, Myrmelastes species—particularly obligate ant-followers like M. fortis—exhibit low territorial aggression and a high degree of home range overlap. This behavioral pattern is likely an adaptation to the unpredictable and wide-ranging movements of army-ant swarms, which render fixed territorial boundaries less meaningful.

Population density of Myrmelastes species shows high interannual variability. Long-term field studies in southeastern Peru recorded substantial fluctuations in group size and local abundance, often correlated with changes in ant colony activity, forest phenology, and competitive pressure from other army-ant-following species. These dynamics underscore the ecological dependency of Myrmelastes on both biotic and abiotic cycles in the rainforest.

=== Nesting Behavior ===
Reproductive behavior in Myrmelastes reflects both structural adaptation and environmental constraints. Nests are typically built low to the ground in dense understory vegetation and show considerable architectural diversity. Three main types have been described: open cup nests loosely woven with rootlets and moss; semi-domed nests made from dead leaves and coarse debris; and pendant nests suspended from hanging foliage.

Nest-site selection appears highly influenced by microhabitat features such as humidity, cover, and predator access. In the case of M. fortis, nests were first documented in 1997 and were found placed in deep shade near water sources, possibly to regulate temperature and reduce detection by visually hunting predators . These nesting strategies likely represent an evolutionary trade-off between concealment and environmental buffering in the variable conditions of tropical forests.

=== Vocalizations and Communication ===
Vocal behavior in Myrmelastes species is marked by short, evenly spaced phrases that function in territory announcement, mate coordination, and flock cohesion. The Caura Antbird (M. caurensis), for example, produces a series of harsh, descending whistles most often at dawn and dusk. These calls are usually repeated at regular intervals and may be accompanied by wing-flicking or lateral head movements.

Unlike the elaborate duets found in some other Thamnophilid genera, Myrmelastes species are typically solo singers, though call–response behavior has been noted in pair-bonded individuals. Vocal convergence with other ant-following species may occur during mixed-species foraging flocks, suggesting acoustic plasticity in high-competition contexts.

== Conservation ==
=== Current protection status ===
According to the latest assessment published by the International Union for Conservation of Nature (IUCN) in 2024, all assessed species of the genus Myrmelastes are currently listed as Least Concern. Although the overall status is stable, several surveys have indicated that population trends for these species show a slow decline, mainly due to declines in habitat area and quality.

=== Habitat threats ===
Myrmelastes species are highly dependent on native forest habitat. Forest cover within each species' habitat range has declined by approximately 1% to 9% over the past decade, presumably resulting in population declines of 1%-19%, with best estimates ranging from 5%-9%. Being highly sensitive to forest integrity, these species are at increased risk of survival in the face of forest fragmentation, microclimate change and increased predation pressure.

=== Conservation recommendations ===
To effectively conserve species in the genus Myrmelastes, assessments recommend prioritizing the protection of native forests and enhancing the maintenance of forest connectivity to reduce habitat fragmentation. Meanwhile, Isler et al. note that taxonomic revisions that explicitly subdivide species under the genus can help to identify evolutionarily significant units and support more targeted conservation measures, and Braun et al. further emphasize the importance of geographic isolation and ecological specialization to species formation, suggesting that conservation efforts need to pay special attention to endemic species and their unique ecological needs.
