= Allpahuayo antbird =

Conservation status
- Vulnerable (IUCN 3.1)

Scientific classification
- Kingdom: Animalia
- Phylum: Chordata
- Class: Aves
- Order: Passeriformes
- Family: Thamnophilidae
- Genus: Percnostola
- Species: P. arenarum

Binomial name
- Percnostola arenarum M.L. Isler, J.A. Alonso, P.R. Isler & B.M. Whitney, 2001

Species of bird

The Allpahuayo antbird (Percnostola arenarum) is a Vulnerable species of bird in subfamily Thamnophilinae of family Thamnophilidae, the "typical antbirds". It is endemic to northeastern Peru.

== Taxonomy and systematics ==
The Allpahuayo antbird was formally described in 2001. The holotype is a female collected in 1998 and further specimens were collected during studies in the same general area. The study authors assigned the new species to genus Percnostola that had been erected in 1860; it shares this genus with the black-headed antbird (P. rufifrons). The specific epithet arenarum is derived from the Latin word for "sand", "arena", to reflect the sandy soils of the species' main habitat. The English name recognizes the Zona Reservada Allpahuayo-Mishana.

The Allpahuayo antbird is monotypic. However, females of a sub-population have different colored underparts than the rest and might represent a second subspecies.

== Description ==
The Allpahuayo antbird is 13 to 15 cm (5.1 to 5.9 in) long. One male weighed 22.9 g (0.81 oz) and one female 24.2 g (0.85 oz). Adult males have mostly dark gray upperparts that are darkest on their forecrown and lightest in the center of their back. Their wings are dark gray and their wing coverts black with white edges and tips. Their tail is dark gray with paler gray outer edges. Their lores and ear coverts are dark gray, their chin and throat blackish, and the rest of their underparts dark gray. Adult females have dark gray crown, nape, and upperparts. Their wings are dark gray and their wing coverts black with reddish yellow-brown tips. Their tail is dark gray with paler bluish gray outer edges on the feathers. Their face is a paler gray than their crown and has a yellowish brown tinge. Their chin and the center of their throat are white with a reddish yellow-brown tinge. The underparts of most females are mostly reddish yellow-brown that is darker on the breast than on their belly and crissum. The center of their belly is white and their sides and flanks have a dusky tinge. In one area females have tawny underparts. Both sexes have a gray iris and bluish gray legs and feet. Males have a black bill; females have a black maxilla and a bluish gray mandible.

== Distribution and habitat ==
The Allpahuayo antbird is known only from the Department of Loreto in northeastern Peru. It apparently has a disjunct distribution, with sub-populations known in several areas north of the Amazon River. The main part of its distribution appears to be the drainages of the Nanay and Itaya rivers and a smaller sub-population is along the Morona River to the west. It primarily inhabits the understorey of a forest type locally called varillal. It grows on white sand soils and is characterized by a stunted canopy and dense undergrowth. The western sub-population occurs in a similar forest type (irapayal) on both sandy and weathered clay soils and that is taller with a different understorey plant community. In elevation the species ranges between about 100 and 250 m (330 and 820 ft).

== Behavior ==
=== Movement ===
The Allpahuayo antbird is a year-round resident throughout its range.

=== Feeding ===
The Allpahuayo antbird feeds on insects but no details of its diet are known. It typically forages in pairs or in family groups in dense vegetation, mostly on the ground and within about 1 m (3 ft) above it. It actively hops between short feeding stops. It captures prey by gleaning from vegetation and stems and by searching leaf litter. The western sub-population regularly follows army ant swarms to capture prey fleeing the ants. The main eastern population has not been observed doing so, possibly because ant swarms are known to be rare in its habitat. The species does not join mixed-species feeding flocks.

=== Breeding ===
Nothing is known about the Allpahuayo antbird's breeding biology. Its nest and eggs are assumed to be similar to those of the black-headed antbird, for which see here.

=== Vocalization ===
The Allpahuayo antbird's song is "a moderately paced, slightly decelerating series of monotone whistles usually with a stuttered, higher-pitched introductory note: hi'hi hew-hew-hew-hew-hew-hew-hew". Its calls include "a descending whine or whistle, a harsher tchah, a rising, melodic k'lee? and a musical, rising-falling sputtering rattle: pur'E'E'E'e'e'rr".

== Status ==
The IUCN has assessed the Allpahuayo antbird as Vulnerable. It has a small range; its "uncommon and local" population is estimated at between 600 and 1700 mature individuals and is believed to be decreasing. "Based on current knowledge about this species, it has a very specialised habitat niche and a very small geographic range. The habitats in which it is found are subject to intense human activity...exacerbated by the fact that the species has only been found in certain 'varillales', and even fewer 'irapayales'." "The establishment of the Allpahuayo-Mishana National Reserve...which includes much of the known range of P. arenarum, was a critical step in the protection of this species." Its largest known population is in the Zona Reservada Allpahuayo-Mishana, "but in view of the proximity of this reserve to the growing city of Iquitos, this reserve remains vulnerable to illegal homesteading, hunting, logging, and even road construction".
