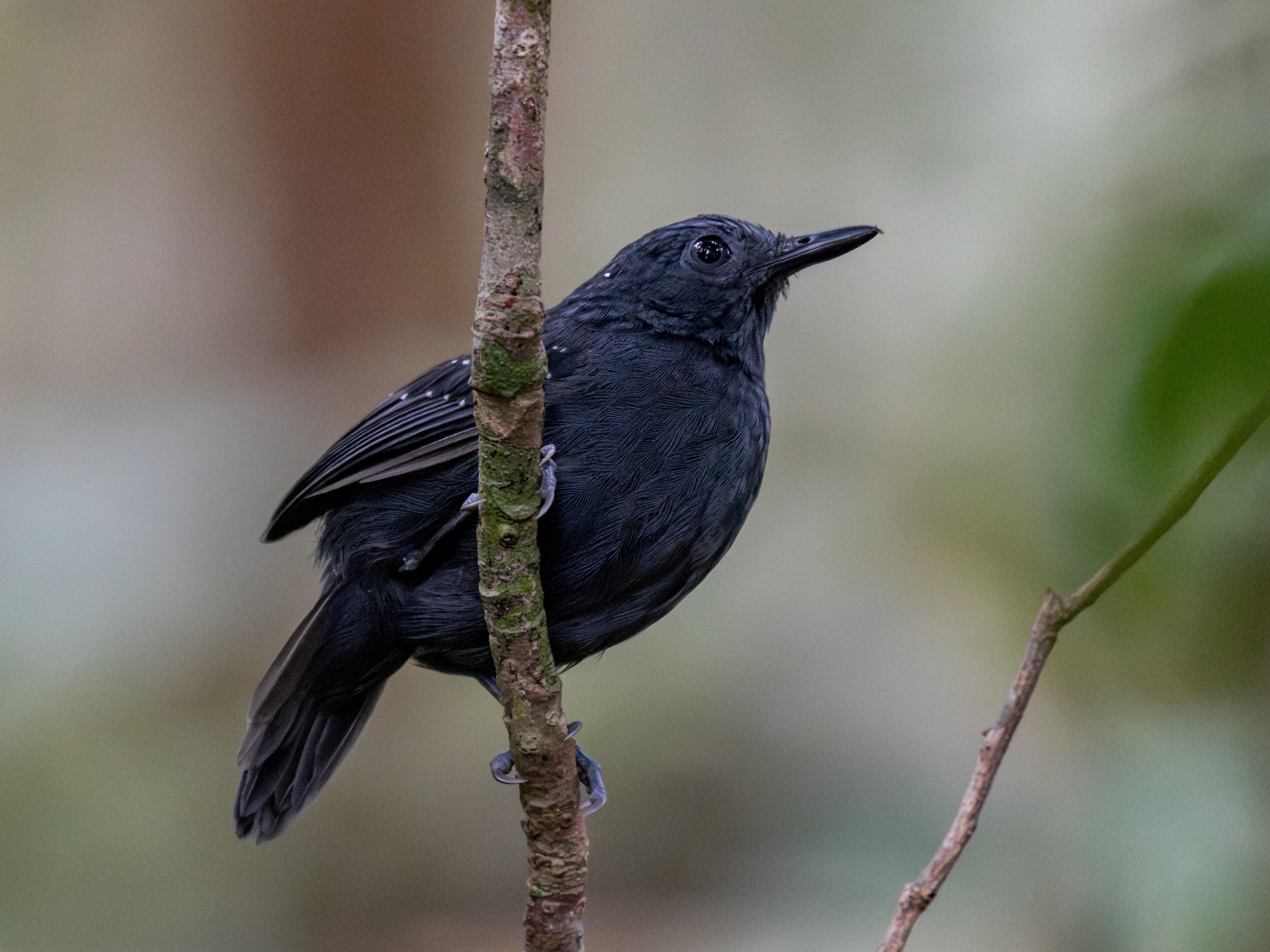
- Male
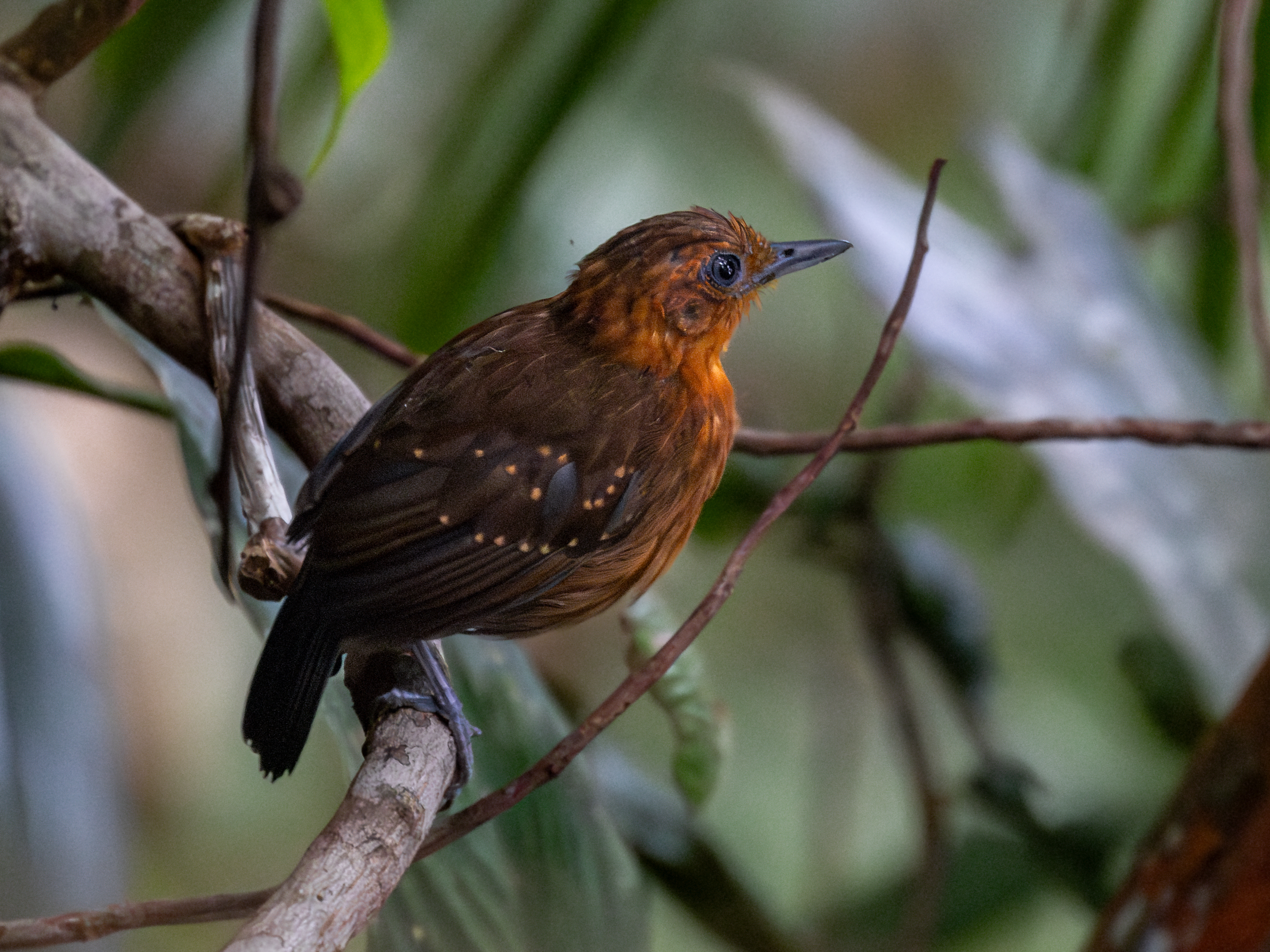
- Female

Conservation status
- Least Concern (IUCN 3.1)

Scientific classification
- Kingdom: Animalia
- Phylum: Chordata
- Class: Aves
- Order: Passeriformes
- Family: Thamnophilidae
- Genus: Myrmelastes
- Species: M. schistaceus

Binomial name
- Myrmelastes schistaceus (Sclater, PL, 1858)

Synonyms
- Percnostola schistacea; Schistocichla schistacea; Sclateria schistacea

= Slate-colored antbird =

Species of bird

The slate-colored antbird (Myrmelastes schistaceus) is a species of bird in subfamily Thamnophilinae of family Thamnophilidae, the "typical antbirds". It is found in Brazil, Colombia, Ecuador, and Peru.

== Taxonomy and systematics ==
The slate-colored antbird has a complicated taxonomic history. It was described by the English zoologist Philip Sclater in 1858 and given the binomial name Hypnocmenis schistacea. Later authors placed it successively in genera Sclateria, Schistocichla, and Percnostola. Some time after its initial description it was assigned several subspecies, but a 1924 study determined that some of them were species in their own right and a 1931 study confirmed that schistacea is monotypic. A 2013 study finalized its move to genus Myrmelastes, and because that name is masculine, the change of its specific name to schistaceus.

== Description ==
The slate-colored antbird is 14.5 to 15.5 cm (5.7 to 6.1 in) long and weighs 19 to 28.5 g (0.67 to 1.0 oz). Males are mostly dark bluish gray or slate gray. Their wings and tail are blackish gray with small white spots at the tips of the wing coverts. Females have a dark chestnut crown with thin rufous streaks. Their back and wings are olive brown with wide ochraceous buff tips on the wing coverts. Their tail is slate gray, their face and underparts are orangish rufous or rufous. Both sexes have a gray iris and leaden to bluish gray legs and feet. Males have a black bill; females have a gray maxilla and a black mandible.

== Distribution and habitat ==
The slate-colored antbird is found in the lowlands of the western Amazon Basin. It occurs in southern Colombia, far northeastern Ecuador, northeastern to east-central Peru, and western Brazil east to central Amazonas state. It inhabits the understory of terra firme forest. In elevation it reaches 250 m (800 ft) in Ecuador and 400 m (1,300 ft) in Colombia.

== Behavior ==
=== Movement ===
The slate-colored antbird is believed to be a year-round resident throughout its range.

=== Feeding ===
The slate-colored antbird's diet has not been detailed but is known to include insects. It forages as individuals, pairs, and small family groups and mostly within about 1 m (3 ft) of the ground and only rarely with mixed species feeding flocks. They hop along the ground and among low branches and take prey mostly by picking from leaf litter and by reaching to leaves and twigs from the ground or a low perch. They occasionally attend army ant swarms to capture prey disturbed by the ants.

=== Breeding ===
Nothing is known about the slate-colored antbird's breeding biology.

=== Vocalization ===
The slate-colored antbird's song has been described as "a simple series of penetrating but semi musical notes, 'peeyr-peeyr-peeyr-peeyr-peeyr' " and "a slow, accelerating, rising series of clear whistles: heew hew-hew-hew-hew, rarely with a buzzy terminal note".

== Status ==
The IUCN has assessed the slate-colored antbird as being of Least Concern. It has a large range; its population size is not known and is believed to be decreasing. No immediate threats have been identified. It is considered uncommon in Colombia and Peru and local in Ecuador. "As is true of all species that occupy forested habitats, Slate-colored Antbird is vulnerable to habitat loss or degradation; this species may be particularly vulnerable, as it is suspected to avoid second growth or forests that have been subjected to disturbance, such as from logging operations."
