= Roraiman antbird =

Conservation status
- Least Concern (IUCN 3.1)

Scientific classification
- Kingdom: Animalia
- Phylum: Chordata
- Class: Aves
- Order: Passeriformes
- Family: Thamnophilidae
- Genus: Myrmelastes
- Species: M. saturatus

Binomial name
- Myrmelastes saturatus (Salvin, 1885)

Synonyms
- Schistocichla leucostigma saturata; Schistocichla saturata; Percnostola saturata

Species of bird

The Roraiman antbird (Myrmelastes saturatus) is a species of passerine bird in subfamily Thamnophilinae of family Thamnophilidae, the "typical antbirds". It is found in Brazil, Guyana, and Venezuela.

== Taxonomy and systematics ==
The Roraiman antbird has a complicated taxonomic history. It was previously considered as a subspecies of the spot-winged antbird (now M. leucostigma), which at times had been placed in genera Percnostola and Schistocichla. A 2007 study of the vocal characteristics of the then many subspecies of the spot-winged found significant differences between the taxa. Based on this evidence the Roraiman antbird was promoted to species status and given its English name. A 2013 study finalized its move to genus Myrmelastes.

The Roraiman antbird has two subspecies, the nominate M. s. saturatus (Salvin, 1885) and M. s. obscurus (Zimmer, JT & Phelps, WH, 1946).

== Description ==
The Roraiman antbird is 14 to 16 cm (5.5 to 6.3 in) long and weighs 24 to 31.7 g (0.85 to 1.1 oz). Males of the nominate subspecies are mostly blackish slate, with wide white tips on their wing coverts. Females have a dark gray crown and dark cinnamon-brown upperparts. Their wings and tail are blackish brown with pale cinnamon-rufous tips on the wing coverts. Their face is gray. Their throat, breast, and belly are chestnut and their flanks and undertail coverts olive-brown. Both sexes have a brown or gray-brown iris and gray to black legs and feet. Males of subspecies M. s. obscurus are slightly blacker than nominate males and females have slightly darker underparts than nominate females.Males of both subspecies usually have a black bill though some have a gray base to the mandible. Females of both have a black maxilla and a gray mandible.

== Distribution and habitat ==
The Roraiman antbird is found in the eastern tepui region where eastern Venezuela, western Guyana, and far northern Brazil meet. The nominate subspecies occurs on Mount Roraima that straddles the Venezuela-Guyana border. Subspecies M. s. obscurus is found on tepuis other than Roraima in Venezuela's eastern Bolívar state and adjoining extreme northern Roraima state of Brazil. The species inhabits dense understorey in tall evergreen forest on the tepuis, where it favors the margins of clear, swift, streams on steep rocky slopes. In elevation it mostly occurs above 700 m (2,300 ft) in Brazil and Guyana, though there are records as low as 125 m (400 ft) in the latter country. In Venezuela it mostly occurs between 1,000 and 1,500 m (3,300 and 4,900 ft).

== Behavior ==
=== Movement ===
The Roraiman antbird is believed to be a year-round resident throughout its range.

=== Feeding ===
The Roraiman antbird's diet and foraging behavior are not known but are assumed to be very similar or identical to those of its former "parent" the spot-winged antbird, which see here.

=== Breeding ===
Nothing is known about the Roraiman antbird's breeding biology.

=== Vocalization ===
The Roraiman antbird's song is a "series of slowly starting, accelerating notes, sharply lowered in pitch at [the] end". The species' "long call" is an abrupt high-pitched note followed by a downslurred whistle. Its other calls are apparently the same as those of the spot-winged antbird, an "abrupt unclear note given singly or in series of 2–5" and a "short rattle".

== Status ==
The IUCN has assessed the Roraiman antbird as being of Least Concern. It has a restricted range; its population size is not known and is believed to be stable. No immediate threats have been identified. It is considered uncommon across its range; it does occur in several protected areas. "Regions inhabited by [the] species also encompass extensive areas of intact habitat which are not formally protected, but seem unlikely to be threatened by development in the near future."
