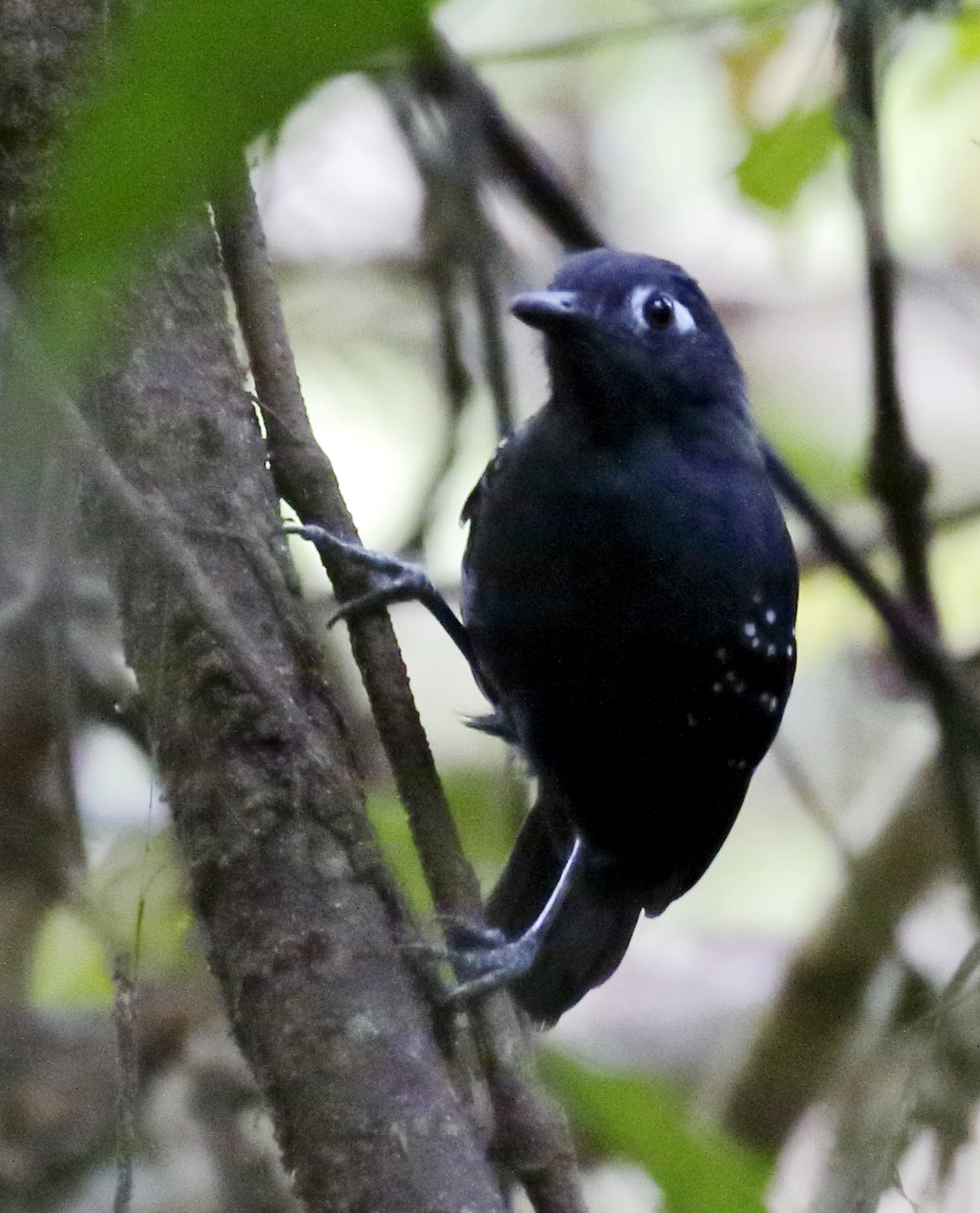
- Male
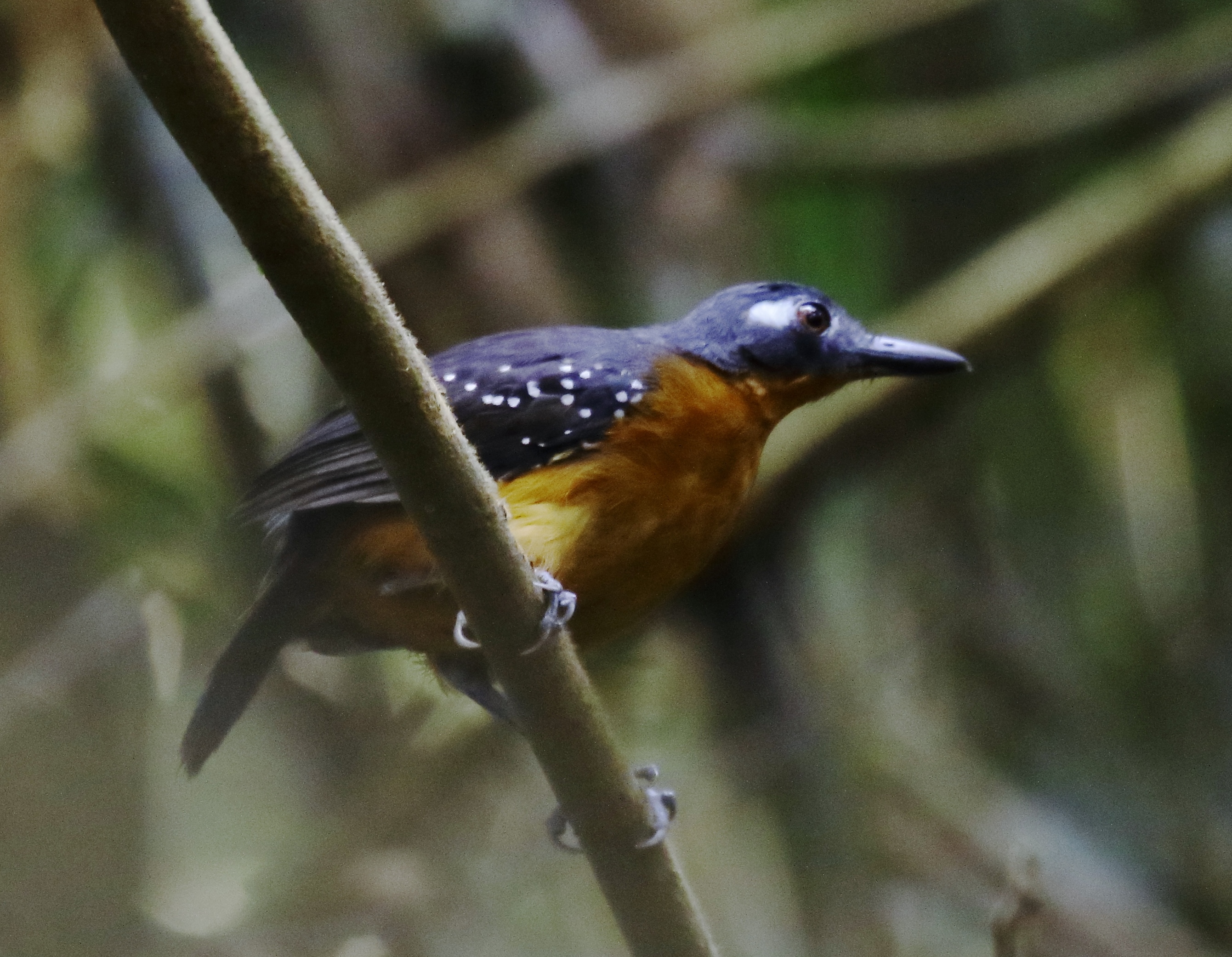
- Female

Conservation status
- Least Concern (IUCN 3.1)

Scientific classification
- Kingdom: Animalia
- Phylum: Chordata
- Class: Aves
- Order: Passeriformes
- Family: Thamnophilidae
- Genus: Myrmelastes
- Species: M. hyperythrus

Binomial name
- Myrmelastes hyperythrus (Sclater, PL, 1855)

Synonyms
- Myrmeciza hyperythra

= Plumbeous antbird =

Species of bird

The plumbeous antbird (Myrmelastes hyperythrus) is a species of bird in subfamily Thamnophilinae of family Thamnophilidae, the "typical antbirds". It is found in Bolivia, Brazil, Colombia, Ecuador, and Peru.

== Taxonomy and systematics ==
The plumbeous antbird was described by the English zoologist Philip Sclater in 1855 and given the binomial name Thamnophilus hyperythrus. The specific name combines the Ancient Greek words hupo "beneath" and eruthros "red". Alternatively, the name may be from the Greek word huperuthros for "reddish". The current genus Myrmelastes was introduced by Sclater in 1858 with the plumbeous antbird as the type species. This placement was confirmed by a genetic study published in 2013.

The plumbeous antbird is monotypic.

== Description ==
The plumbeous antbird is 17 to 18 cm (6.7 to 7.1 in) long and weighs 38 to 44 g (1.3 to 1.6 oz). Males are mostly dark slaty gray. Their wings and tail are blackish gray with white spots at the tips of the wing coverts. They have a large area of bare light blue skin around their eye. Females have dark slaty gray upperparts, wings, and tail like males. Their underparts are bright rufous with a brown tinge on their flanks and crissum.

== Distribution and habitat ==
The plumbeous antbird is found in the western Amazon Basin. It ranges from Caquetá Department in southern Colombia and Sucumbíos and Orellana provinces in northeastern Ecuador south through eastern Peru into northwestern Bolivia and east in Brazil to the basin of the Purus River. It inhabits the floor and understorey of evergreen forest. It favors the interior of várzea where tree falls create openings, but also occurs in transitional forest and along small watercourses and oxbow lakes. In elevation it reaches 500 m (1,600 ft) in Colombia and 300 m (1,000 ft) in Ecuador. It Peru it mostly occurs below 500 m (1,600 ft) but locally is found as high as 800 m (2,600 ft).

== Behavior ==
=== Movement ===
The plumbeous antbird is believed to be a year-round resident throughout its range.

=== Feeding ===
The plumbeous antbird's diet has not been detailed but is known to include insects, other arthropods, and snails. It forages as individuals, pairs, and small family groups and mostly within about 3 m (10 ft) of the ground and usually not with mixed-species feeding flocks. They hop along the ground and among low branches, and take prey mostly by picking from leaf litter and by reaching to leaves and twigs from the ground or a low perch. They occasionally attend army ant swarms to capture prey disturbed by the ants.

=== Breeding ===
The plumbeous antbird's breeding season appears to vary geographically. In Ecuador it could span as much as from April to December; in Peru it includes March and October and in Brazil August. Its nest was first described in 2003 based on two nests found in Manú National Park, Peru. The open cup-shaped nests were suspended 0.7 m (2 ft) and 1.0 m (3 ft) above the ground. They were constructed of black rhizomorphs and covered in dry leaves attached with spider silk. Each nest contained two eggs. These had a pinkish white background which was almost completely covered with dark purplish-red streaks. The first nest measured 23 mm × 17 mm (0.91 in × 0.67 in) and the second 24 mm × 20 mm (0.94 in × 0.79 in). A nest in Brazil was similarly woven of blackish brown rootlets and hung about 1 m (3 ft) above the ground in spiny palms. The incubation period, time to fledging, and details of parental care are not known.

=== Vocalization ===
The plumbeous antbird's song is "a long...rattling trill that accelerates throughout, and gains and then declines in intensity". It has been written as "wo-wu-wu-wu-wu-wu-wu-wrrrrrrrrrr" and "wur-wur-wurwrwrwe'e'e'e'e'ip". Its calls include "wo-púr" or "klo-kú" and "a fast chattering 'chrr-trr-trr-trr-trr-trr-trr' ".

== Status ==
The IUCN has assessed the plumbeous antbird as being of Least Concern. It has a large range; its population size is not known and is believed to be stable. No immediate threats have been identified. It is considered fairly common to common in most of its range. Its range includes several large protected areas both public and private, and "also encompasses extensive areas of intact habitat which, although not formally protected, are at little risk of being developed in the near future".
