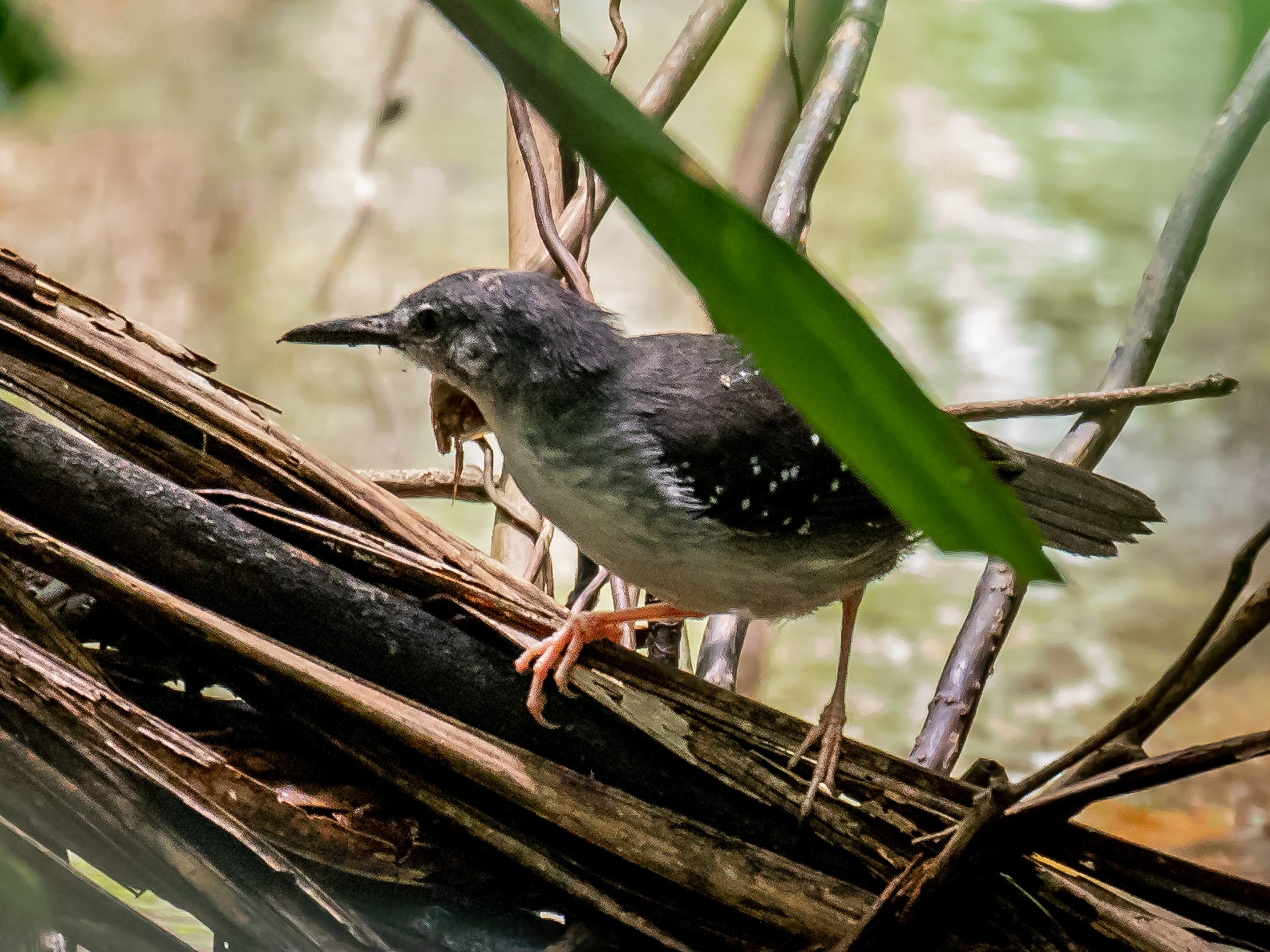
- Male
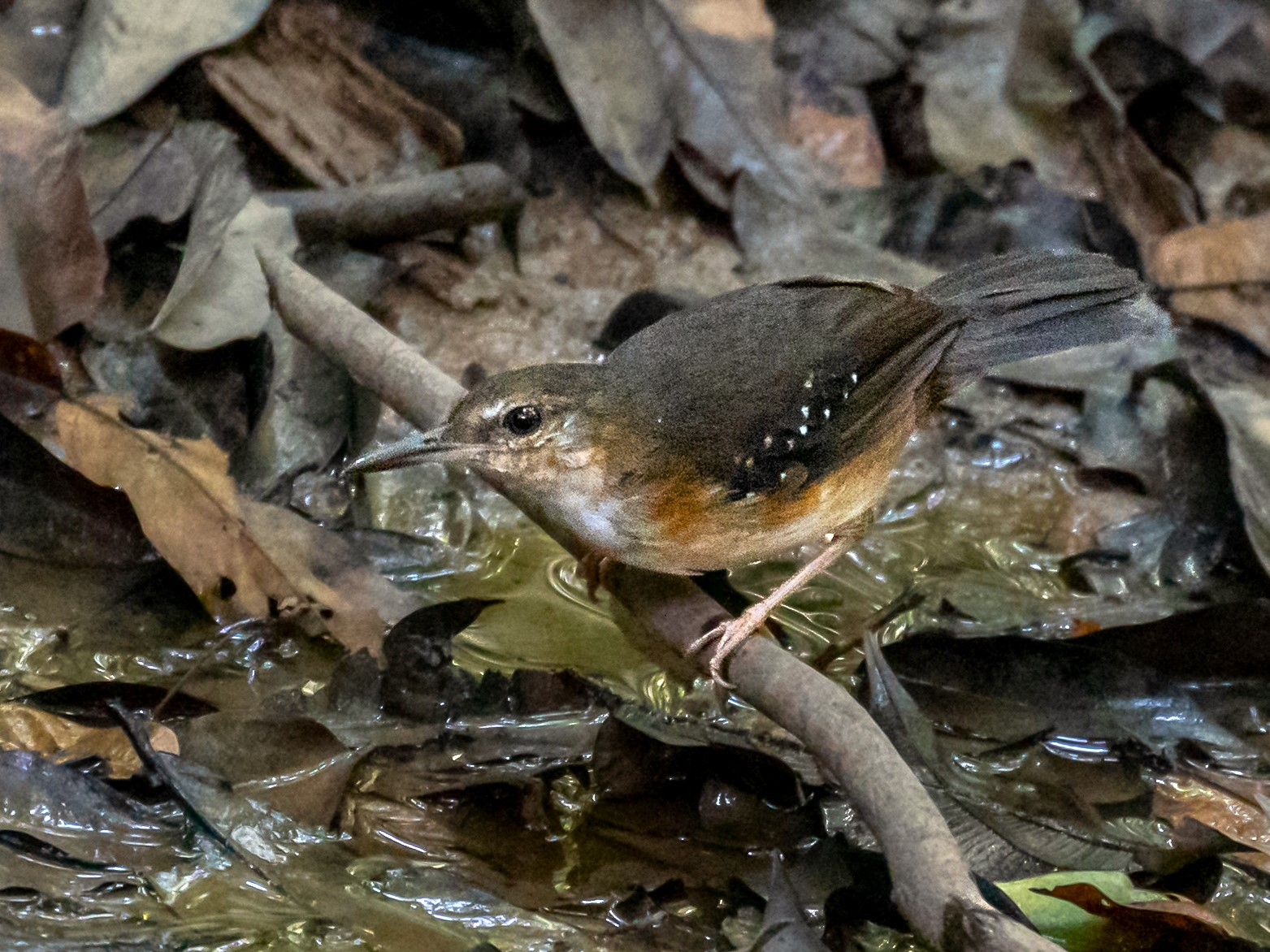
- Female

Conservation status
- Least Concern (IUCN 3.1)

Scientific classification
- Kingdom: Animalia
- Phylum: Chordata
- Class: Aves
- Order: Passeriformes
- Family: Thamnophilidae
- Genus: Sclateria; Oberholser, 1899
- Species: S. naevia

Binomial name
- Sclateria naevia (Gmelin, JF, 1788)

Synonyms
- Sitta naevia Herpsilochmus argentatus

= Silvered antbird =

Species of bird

The silvered antbird (Sclateria naevia) is a passerine bird in the subfamily Thamnophilinae of the family Thamnophilidae, the "typical antbirds." It is found in Trinidad and every mainland South American country except Argentina, Chile, Paraguay, and Uruguay.

== Taxonomy and systematics ==
The silvered antbird was formally described in 1788 by the German naturalist Johann Friedrich Gmelin in his revised and expanded edition of Carl Linnaeus's Systema Naturae. He placed it with the nuthatches in the genus Sitta and coined the binomial name Sitta naevia. Gmelin based his description of the "wall-creeper of Surinam," described and illustrated in 1764 by the English naturalist George Edwards in his Gleanings of Natural History. Edwards' specimen was preserved in spirits. It had been presented to the physician John Fothergill. The silvered antbird is now the only species in the genus Sclateria, introduced in 1899 by the American ornithologist Harry C. Oberholser. The genus name was chosen to honor the ornithologist Philip Sclater. The specific epithet is from the Latin naevius, meaning "spotted."

The silvered antbird has these four subspecies:

- S. n. naevia (Gmelin, JF, 1788)
- S. n. diaphora Todd, 1913
- S. n. argentata (Des Murs, 1856)
- S. n. toddi Hellmayr, 1924

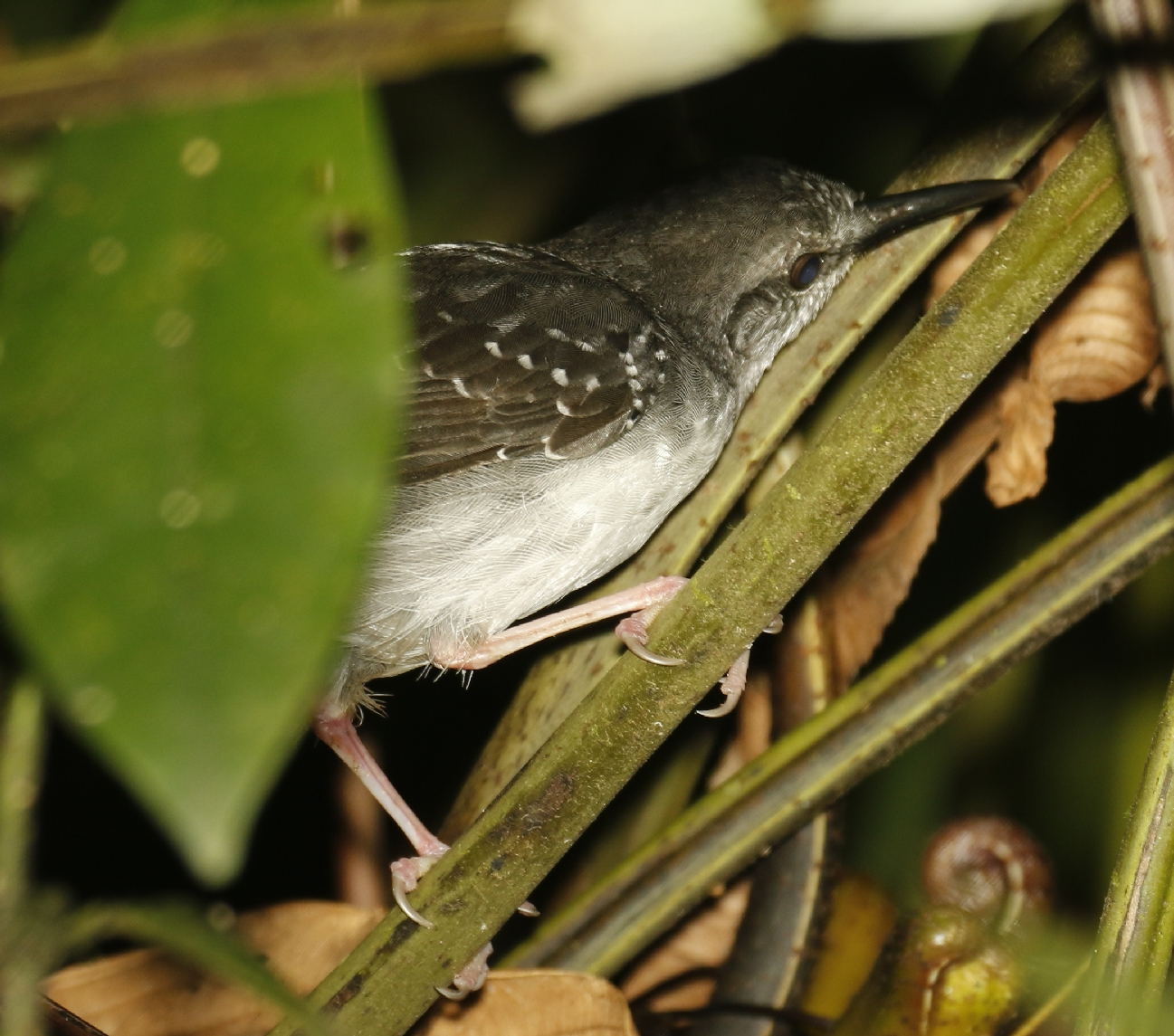
At Sacha Lodge, Ecuador (flash photo)

== Description ==
The silvered antbird is 14 to 16 cm (5.5 to 6.3 in) long and weighs 21 to 27 g (0.74 to 0.95 oz). Adult males of the nominate subspecies S. n. naevia have a dark gray crown, nape, and upperparts. Their wings and tail are blackish gray with white tips on the wing coverts. Their face is mostly dark gray with a paler gray supercilium. Their underparts are mostly white with gray scalloping that is lightest on the throat. Their flanks, crissum, and underwing coverts are gray. Adult females have the same pattern as males, but are grayish brown, whereas males are gray and have cinnamon tips on the wing coverts. Subadult males look like adult females.

Males of subspecies S. n. argentata have almost white underparts with faint light gray mottling on the breast and flanks and a paler gray crissum than the nominate. Females have grayer upperparts than the nominate; their underparts vary from white with buffy brown sides and vent area to deep buff with browner sides and vent. S. n. toddi is intermediate between the nominate and argentata. S. n. diaphora males have small white dots, rather than white tips, on their wing coverts, and mostly gray underparts with a few thin white streaks on the breast. Females have ochraceous tawny underparts with little to no mottling.

== Distribution and habitat ==
The subspecies of the silvered antbird are found thus:

- S. n. naevia: Trinidad, eastern Venezuela, the Guianas, and northeastern Brazil, mostly south of the Amazon
- S. n. diaphora: drainage of the lower Rio Caura in Venezuela's Bolívar state
- S. n. argentata: southeastern Colombia and southern Venezuela south through eastern Ecuador, eastern Peru, and western Amazonian Brazil into northwestern and eastern Bolivia
- S. n. toddi: south-central Amazonian Brazil south of the Amazon from the Rio Madeira and Teles Pires to the Rio Tocantins

The silvered antbird inhabits the floor and understorey of tropical evergreen forest, primarily várzea and igapó, along streams, terra firme and in swampy areas within the forest. It favors areas with vine tangles, branches, and vegetation that overhang the water's edge. In Trinidad and Suriname, it also occurs in mangrove swamps, and Ecuador and Peru, found in Mauritia flexuosa palm swamps. In elevation, it reaches 500 m (1,600 ft) in Venezuela and Colombia, 450 m (1,500 ft) in Ecuador, and 600 m (2,000 ft) in Peru.

== Behavior ==
=== Movement ===
The silvered antbird is believed to be a year-round resident throughout its range.

=== Feeding ===
The silvered antbird feeds primarily on a variety of insects and spiders. It forages as individuals, pairs, and small family groups, mostly within about 1 m (3 ft) of the ground and seldom with mixed-species feeding flocks. They hop along the ground and among low branches, and take prey mostly by picking from leaf litter and reaching up to leaves and twigs. They also pick prey from the water's surface while perched above it. They rarely attend army ant swarms, which are rare in their often-flooded habitat.

=== Breeding ===
The silvered antbird's breeding season is unknown but varies geographically. It includes August in Suriname and northern Brazil and spans at least October to November in Peru. Its nest is an open cup of thick rootlets and moss with bits of fern and lined with thinner rootlets. It is typically woven to low branches overhanging water. The clutch is usually two bluish white eggs with red-brown spots and blotches. The incubation period, time to fledging, and details of parental care are not known.

=== Vocalization ===
The silvered antbird's song is "a long rapid trill...of abrupt notes, introduced by more emphatic and higher notes than immediately following ones, latter building in intensity and rising in pitch, then dropping off steeply at end". It has been written as "jyíp, ji-ji-ji-ji-ji-jíjíjíjíjí-ji-ji-jrrr" and "tweep, twep, tip-tip-tip-tip-tí-tí-ti-ti-ti=TI-TI-TI-TI-TI-ti-ti-ti-ti-ti-i-i-i". Its calls include "abrupt 'pit' notes" and a "long downslurred whistle".

== Status ==
The IUCN has assessed the silvered antbird as being of Least Concern. It has a very large range; its population size is unknown and is believed to be stable. No immediate threats have been identified. It is considered fairly common in most of its range and common in Colombia. Its range includes many protected areas and "also encompasses extensive areas of suitable habitat which are not formally protected, but appear to be at little risk of development in the near future."
