= Carl Eduard Hellmayr =

Austrian ornithologist (1878–1944)

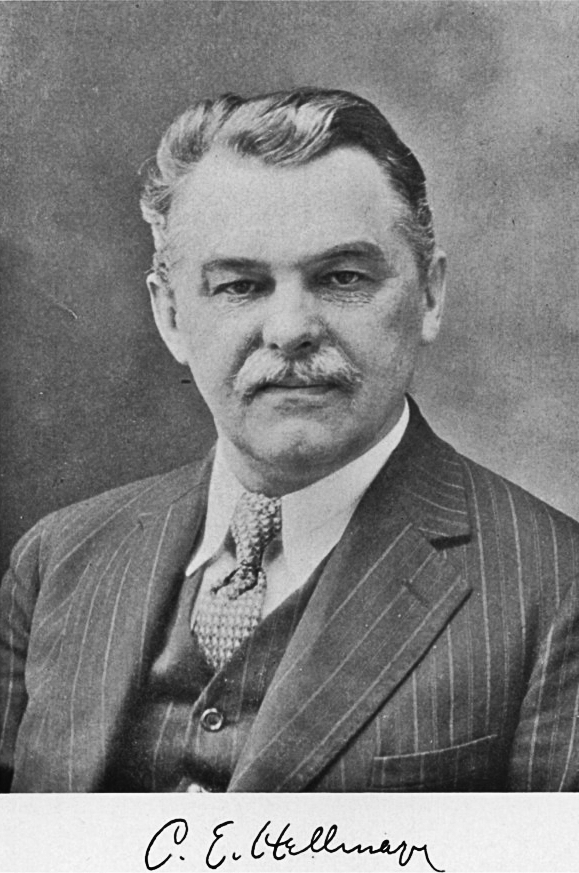
Carl Eduard Hellmayr

Carl Eduard Hellmayr (29 January 1878 – 24 February 1944) was an Austrian ornithologist.

== Biography ==
Carl Eduard Hellmayr was born on 29 January 1878 in Vienna and studied at the University of Vienna, although he did not complete his degree. After his studies he worked in Vienna, Munich, Berlin, Paris, Tring (England), and Chicago.

He spent the years 1905–1908 studying Baron Rothschild's private collection of natural history specimens at Tring, near London. There he received guidance from the German ornithologist Ernst Hartert.

In 1908, Hellmayr was appointed Curator of the Bird Department at the Bavarian State Museum, which he had helped organize in 1903 and where he became a specialist in Neotropical birds, studying Johann Baptist von Spix's collection of Brazilian birds.

In 1922, he was made Curator in Zoology at the Field Museum in Chicago. He stayed there until 1931. His books included 13 of the 15 volumes of the Catalogue of Birds of the Americas (1918–1949), a work initiated by Hellmayr's predecessor, Charles B. Cory. With Henry Boardman Conover he published The Birds of Chile.

In 1931, Hellmayr went back to Vienna. After the Nazi takeover of Austria in 1938, he was arrested and briefly jailed for reasons that are not fully known but probably related to his unsympathetic views toward the Nazi Party (Hellmayr did not make political statements in public, but his interest – as an amateur historian – in the French Revolution shows that he was more than casually interested in such topics). After his release he emigrated with his wife to Switzerland. Following a long period of declining health, he died in 1944 in Orselina, near Locarno.

Historian François Vuilleumier writes that "Hellmayr's pivotal role was first and foremost to bring order to [the] nomenclatural chaos" of his day that had resulted in erroneous citations and hindered analysis of species and genera.
