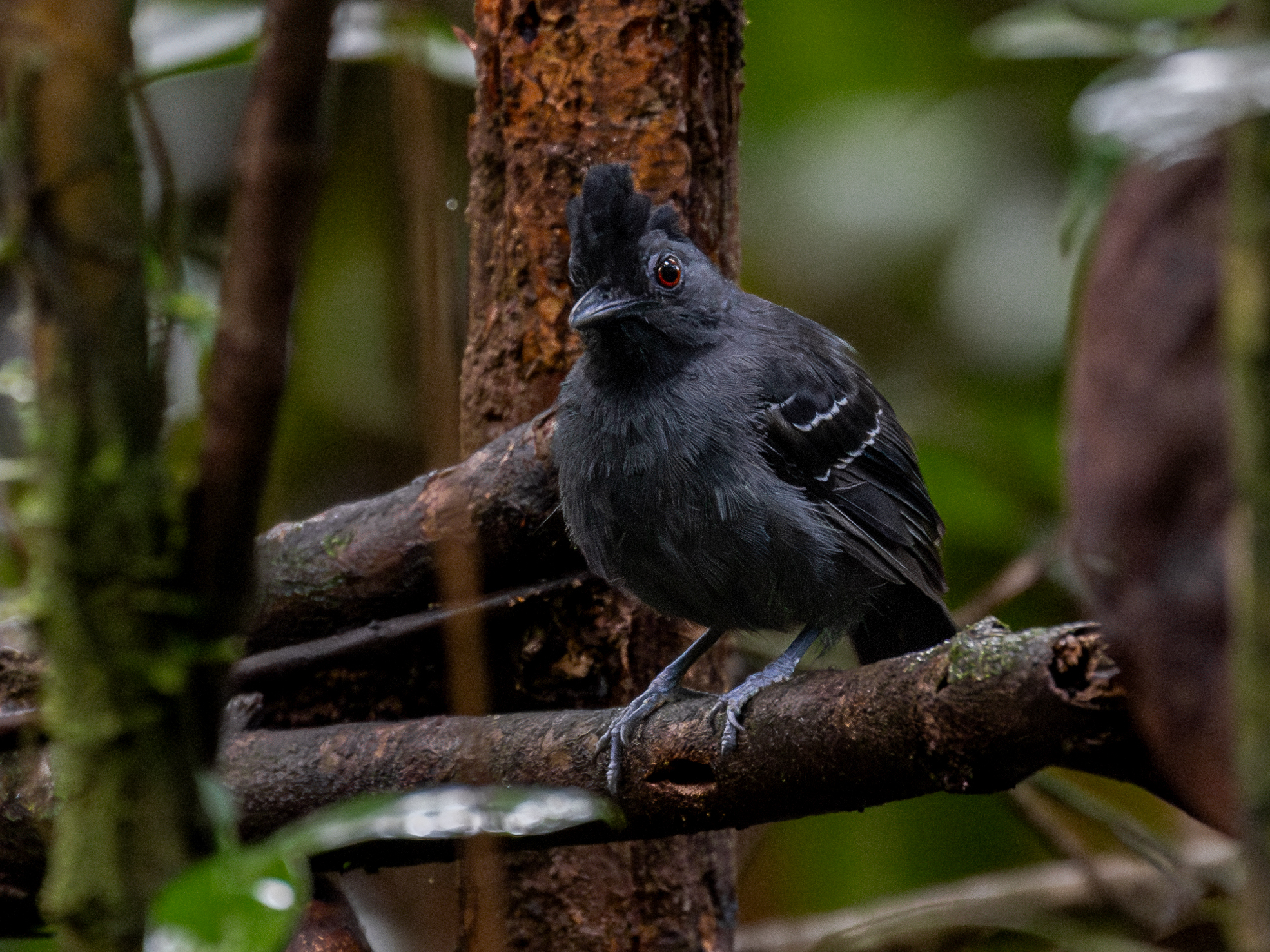
- Black-headed antbird (Percnostola rufifrons)

Scientific classification
- Kingdom: Animalia
- Phylum: Chordata
- Class: Aves
- Order: Passeriformes
- Family: Thamnophilidae
- Genus: Percnostola; Cabanis & Heine, 1860

Type species
- Lanius funebris Lichtenstein, 1823

Species
- see text

= Percnostola =

Genus of birds

Percnostola is a genus of insectivorous passerine birds in the family Thamnophilidae.

The genus was erected by the German ornithologists Jean Cabanis and Ferdinand Heine in 1860. The type species is the black-headed antbird. The name of the genus comes from the Ancient Greek words perknos meaning "dark" or "dusky" and stolē meaning "dress" or "clothing".

The genus contains two species:

- Black-headed antbird (Percnostola rufifrons)
- Allpahuayo antbird (Percnostola arenarum)

The genus previously included the white-lined antbird but a genetic study published in 2013 found that it is embedded within Myrmoborus.
