= Trochilini =

- Red-billed streamertail (Trochilus polytmus)

Scientific classification
- Kingdom: Animalia
- Phylum: Chordata
- Class: Aves
- Order: Apodiformes
- Family: Trochilidae
- Subfamily: Trochilinae
- Tribe: Trochilini; Vigors, 1825

Genera
- 36, see text

Tribe of birds

Trochilini is one of the three tribes that make up the subfamily Trochilinae in the hummingbird family Trochilidae. The other two tribes in the subfamily are Lampornithini (mountain gems) and Mellisugini (bees).

The informal name "emeralds" has been proposed for this group. Several genera contain species with "emerald" in their common name including Chlorostilbon which contains ten. The tribe contains 114 species divided into 36 genera.

== Phylogeny ==
A molecular phylogenetic study of the hummingbirds published in 2007 found that the species formed nine major clades. When Edward Dickinson and James Van Remsen, Jr. updated the Howard and Moore Complete Checklist of the Birds of the World for the 4th edition in 2013 they based their classification on these results and placed three of the nine clades in the subfamily Trochilinae. The clades were placed in separate tribes which they named Trochilini (emeralds), Lampornithini (mountain gems) and Mellisugini (bees). The tribe Trochilini with the current circumscription was introduced in 2009.

Molecular phylogenetic studies by Jimmy McGuire and collaborators published between 2007 and 2014 determined the relationships between the major groups of hummingbirds. In the cladogram below the English names are those introduced in 1997. The Latin names are those proposed by Dickinson and Remsen in 2013.

- Trochilidae
  - - Florisuginae – topazes
    - Phaethornithinae – hermits
  - - Polytminae – mangoes
    - - Lesbiinae
        - Heliantheini – brilliants
        - Lesbiini – coquettes
      - - Patagoninae – giant hummingbird
        - Trochilinae
          - - Lampornithini – mountain gems
            - Mellisugini – bees
          - Trochilini – emeralds

The 2014 study by McGuire led to a major revision of the classification of the Trochilini. Many of the traditional genera were found to be polyphyletic and as a result the classification was substantially revised as shown below in the cladogram. Only one new genus was introduced (Elliotomyia) but eleven genera were resurrected (Phaeoptila, Riccordia, Pampa, Thaumasius, Talaphorus, Leucolia which was later renamed Ramosomyia, Saucerottia, Amazilis, Uranomitra, Chionomesa and Polyerata). At the same time six of the former genera were synonymized (Aphantochroa, Cyanophaia, Elvira, Goethalsia, Juliamyia and Lepidopyga). The number of species in each genus are taken from the AviList taxonomy published in 2025.

- Trochilini
  - - - Phaeoptila – dusky hummingbird
      - - Riccordia – 5 species
        - - Cynanthus – 6 species
          - Chlorostilbon – 10 species: emeralds
    - - Basilinna – 2 species
      - - Pampa – 2 species: sabrewings
        - - - - Klais – violet-headed hummingbird
              - Abeillia – emerald-chinned hummingbird
            - - Orthorhynchus – Antillean crested hummingbird
              - - Stephanoxis – 2 species: plovercrests
                - Anthocephala – 2 species: blossomcrowns
          - Campylopterus – 10 species
  - - - - Microchera – 3 species
        - - Goldmania – 2 species
          - Eupherusa – 5 species
      - - Chalybura – 2 species: plumeleteers
        - Thalurania – 4 species: woodnymphs
    - - - Phaeochroa – scaly-breasted hummingbird
        - Leucippus – buffy hummingbird
      - - - Thaumasius – 2 species
          - - Taphrospilus – many-spotted hummingbird
            - Eupetomena – 2 species
        - - - Talaphorus – olive-spotted hummingbird
            - - Trochilus – 2 species: streamertails
              - - Ramosomyia – 2 species
                - Saucerottia – 10 species
          - - Amazilia – 4 species
            - - - Amazilis – amazilia hummingbird
                - - Uranomitra – Andean emerald
                  - Chrysuronia – 10 species
              - - - Leucochloris – white-throated hummingbird
                  - - Chionomesa – 2 species: emeralds
                    - - Hylocharis – 2 species: sapphires
                      - Elliotomyia – 2 species
                - - Polyerata – 3 species
                  - Chlorestes – 5 species

== Taxonomic list ==
The tribe contains 36 genera.

Image	Genus	Living species
	Phaeoptila	Dusky hummingbird, Phaeoptila sordida
	Riccordia	Cuban emerald, Riccordia ricordii; Brace's emerald, Riccordia bracei; Hispaniolan emerald, Riccordia swainsonii; Puerto Rican emerald, Riccordia maugaeus; Blue-headed hummingbird, Riccordia bicolor
	Cynanthus	Broad-billed hummingbird, Cynanthus latirostris; Tres Marias hummingbird, Cynanthus lawrencei; Turquoise-crowned hummingbird, Cynanthus doubledayi; Golden-crowned emerald, Cynanthus auriceps; Cozumel emerald, Cynanthus forficatus; Canivet's emerald, Cynanthus canivetii
	Chlorostilbon	Garden emerald, Chlorostilbon assimilis; Western emerald, Chlorostilbon melanorhynchus; Red-billed emerald, Chlorostilbon gibsoni; Blue-tailed emerald, Chlorostilbon mellisugus; Chiribiquete emerald, Chlorostilbon olivaresi; Glittering-bellied emerald, Chlorostilbon lucidus; Coppery emerald, Chlorostilbon russatus; Narrow-tailed emerald, Chlorostilbon stenurus; Green-tailed emerald, Chlorostilbon alice; Short-tailed emerald, Chlorostilbon poortmani
	Basilinna	White-eared hummingbird, Basilinna leucotis; Xantus's hummingbird, Basilinna xantusii
	Pampa	Curve-winged sabrewing, Pampa curvipennis; Rufous sabrewing, Pampa rufa
	Abeillia	Emerald-chinned hummingbird, Abeillia abeillei
	Klais	Violet-headed hummingbird, Klais guimeti
	Orthorhyncus	Antillean crested hummingbird, Orthorhyncus cristatus
	Anthocephala	Santa Marta blossomcrown, Anthocephala floriceps; Tolima blossomcrown, Anthocephala berlepschi
	Stephanoxis	Green-crowned plovercrest, Stephanoxis lalandi; Purple-crowned plovercrest, Stephanoxis loddigesii
	Campylopterus	Grey-breasted sabrewing, Campylopterus largipennis; Outcrop sabrewing, Campylopterus calcirupicola; Diamantina sabrewing, Campylopterus diamantinensis; Rufous-breasted sabrewing, Campylopterus hyperythrus; White-tailed sabrewing, Campylopterus ensipennis; Lazuline sabrewing, Campylopterus falcatus; Santa Marta sabrewing, Campylopterus phainopeplus; Violet sabrewing, Campylopterus hemileucurus; Buff-breasted sabrewing, Campylopterus duidae; Napo sabrewing, Campylopterus villaviscensio
	Chalybura	Bronze-tailed plumeleteer, Chalybura urochrysia; White-vented plumeleteer, Chalybura buffonii
	Thalurania	Crowned woodnymph, Thalurania colombica; Fork-tailed woodnymph, Thalurania furcata; Long-tailed woodnymph, Thalurania watertonii; Violet-capped woodnymph, Thalurania glaucopis
	Microchera	Snowcap, Microchera albocoronata; Coppery-headed emerald, Microchera cupreiceps; White-tailed emerald, Microchera chionura
	Goldmania	Violet-capped hummingbird, Goldmania violiceps; Pirre hummingbird, Goldmania bella
	Eupherusa	Mexican woodnymph, Eupherusa ridgwayi; White-tailed hummingbird, Eupherusa poliocerca; Oaxaca hummingbird, Eupherusa cyanophrys; Stripe-tailed hummingbird, Eupherusa eximia; Black-bellied hummingbird, Eupherusa nigriventris
	Phaeochroa	Scaly-breasted hummingbird, Phaeochroa cuvierii
	Leucippus	Buffy hummingbird, Leucippus fallax
	Thaumasius	Tumbes hummingbird, Thaumasius baeri; Spot-throated hummingbird, Thaumasius taczanowskii
	Taphrospilus	Many-spotted hummingbird, Taphrospilus hypostictus
	Eupetomena	Swallow-tailed hummingbird, Eupetomena macrourus; Sombre hummingbird, Eupetomena cirrochloris
	Talaphorus	Olive-spotted hummingbird, Talaphorus chlorocercus
	Trochilus	Red-billed streamertail, Trochilus polytmus; Black-billed streamertail, Trochilus scitulus
	Ramosomyia	Violet-crowned hummingbird, Ramosomyia violiceps; Green-fronted hummingbird, Ramosomyia viridifrons; Cinnamon-sided hummingbird, Ramosomyia wagneri
	Saucerottia	Azure-crowned hummingbird, Saucerottia cyanocephala; Blue-vented hummingbird, Saucerottia hoffmanni; Berylline hummingbird, Saucerottia beryllina; Blue-tailed hummingbird, Saucerottia cyanura; Snowy-bellied hummingbird, Saucerottia edward; Steely-vented hummingbird, Saucerottia saucerrottei; Indigo-capped hummingbird, Saucerottia cyanifrons; Chestnut-bellied hummingbird, Saucerottia castaneiventris; Green-bellied hummingbird, Saucerottia viridigaster; Copper-rumped hummingbird, Saucerottia tobaci; Copper-tailed hummingbird, Saucerottia cupreicauda
	Amazilia	Cinnamon hummingbird, Amazilia rutila; Buff-bellied hummingbird, Amazilia yucatanensis; Rufous-tailed hummingbird, Amazilia tzacatl; Honduran emerald, Amazilia luciae; Mangrove hummingbird, Amazilia boucardi
	Amazilis	Amazilia hummingbird, Amazilis amazilia
	Uranomitra	Andean emerald, Uranomitra franciae
	Chrysuronia	Shining-green hummingbird, Chrysuronia goudoti; Golden-tailed sapphire, Chrysuronia oenone; Versicolored emerald, Chrysuronia versicolor; Sapphire-throated hummingbird, Chrysuronia coeruleogularis; Sapphire-bellied hummingbird, Chrysuronia lilliae; Humboldt's sapphire, Chrysuronia humboldtii; Blue-headed sapphire, Chrysuronia grayi; White-chested emerald, Chrysuronia brevirostris; Plain-bellied emerald, Chrysuronia leucogaster
	Leucochloris	White-throated hummingbird, Leucochloris albicollis
	Chionomesa	Glittering-throated emerald, Chionomesa fimbriata; Sapphire-spangled emerald, Chionomesa lactea
	Hylocharis	Rufous-throated sapphire, Hylocharis sapphirina; Gilded sapphire, Hylocharis chrysura
	Elliotomyia	White-bellied hummingbird, Elliotomyia chionogaster; Green-and-white hummingbird, Elliotomyia viridicauda
	Polyerata	Blue-chested hummingbird, Polyerata amabilis; Charming hummingbird, Polyerata decora; Purple-chested hummingbird, Polyerata rosenbergi
	Chlorestes	White-bellied emerald, Chlorestes candida; Blue-throated sapphire, Chlorestes eliciae; White-chinned sapphire, Chlorestes cyanus; Violet-bellied hummingbird, Chlorestes julie; Blue-chinned sapphire, Chlorestes notata

== Sources ==
- Dickinson, E.C.; Remsen, J.V. Jr., eds. (2013). The Howard & Moore Complete Checklist of the Birds of the World. Vol. 1: Non-passerines (4th ed.). Eastbourne, UK: Aves Press. ISBN 978-0-9568611-0-8.
