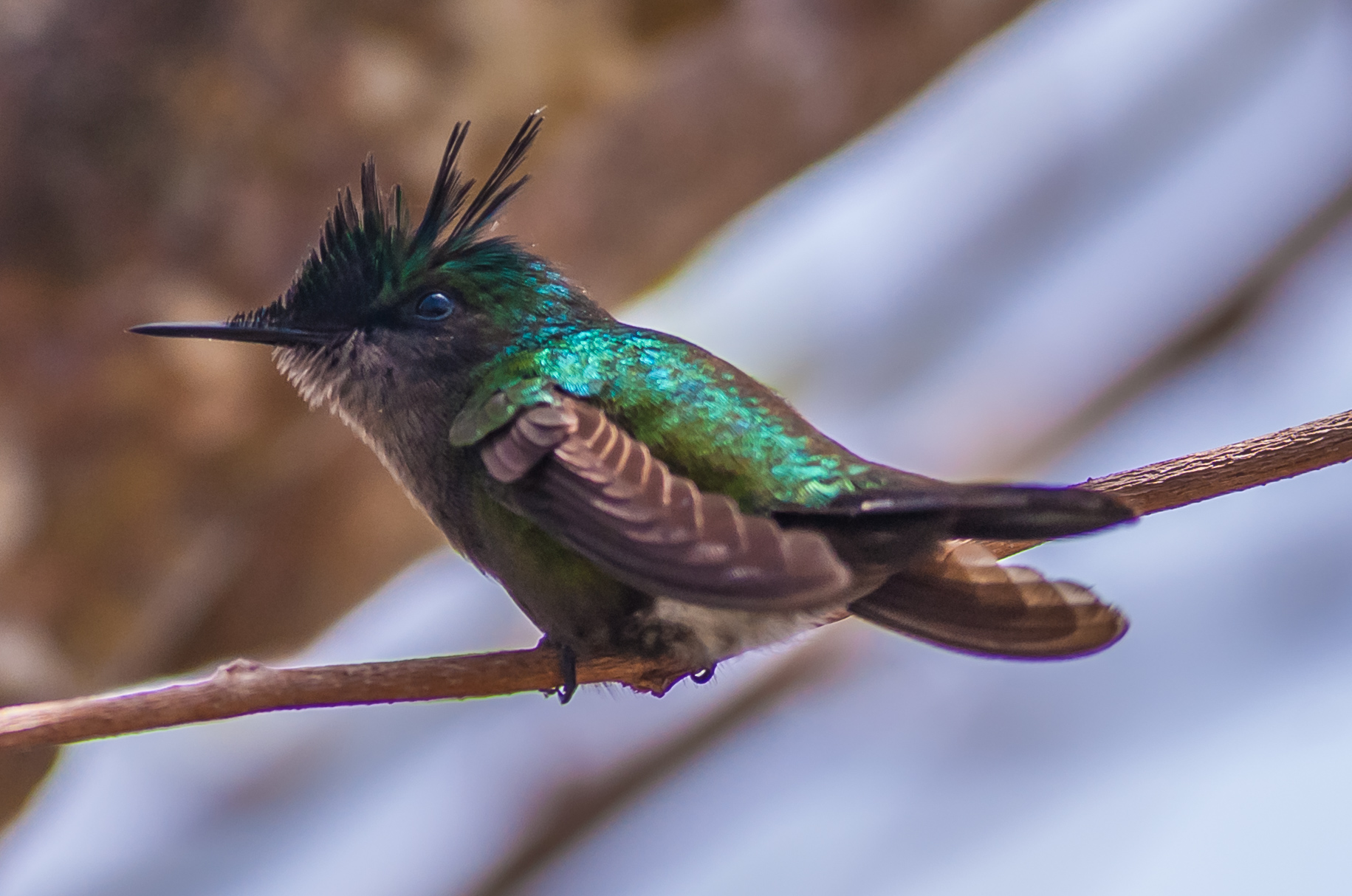

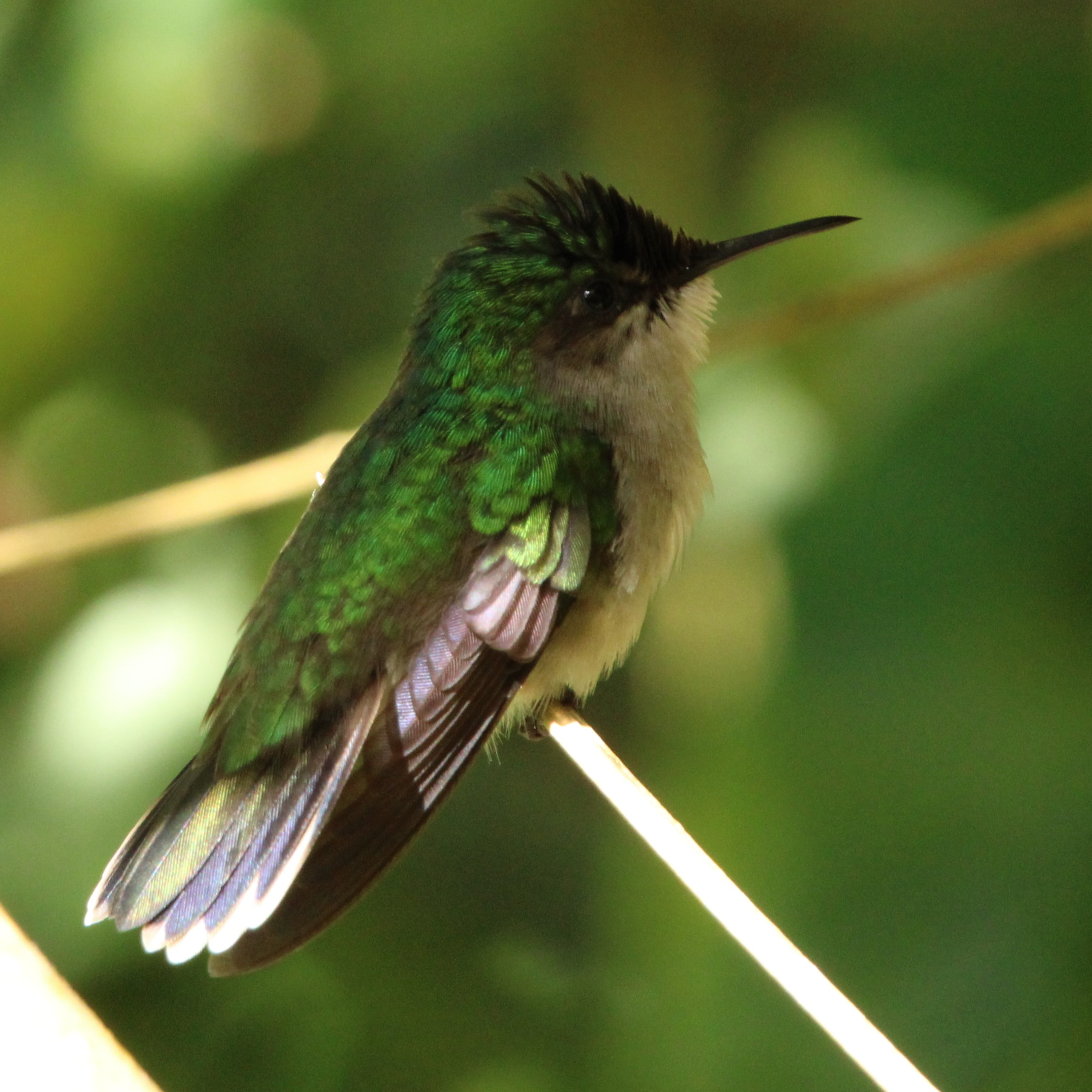
- Female in Saint George Parish, Grenada

Conservation status
- Least Concern (IUCN 3.1)
- CITES Appendix II

Scientific classification
- Kingdom: Animalia
- Phylum: Chordata
- Class: Aves
- Order: Apodiformes
- Family: Trochilidae
- Tribe: Trochilini
- Genus: Orthorhyncus; Lacépède, 1799
- Species: O. cristatus

Binomial name
- Orthorhyncus cristatus (Linnaeus, 1758)

Synonyms
- Trochilus cristatus Linnaeus, 1758

= Antillean crested hummingbird =

Species of bird

The Antillean crested hummingbird (Orthorhyncus cristatus) is a species of hummingbird in the family Trochilidae. Its range extends from eastern Puerto Rico throughout the Lesser Antilles; it has also been recorded as a vagrant in Florida, USA.

== Taxonomy ==
In 1743 the English naturalist George Edwards included an illustration and a description of the Antillean crested hummingbird in his A Natural History of Uncommon Birds. He used the English name "The crested humming bird". Edwards based his hand-coloured etching on a specimen collected in the West Indies. When in 1758 the Swedish naturalist Carl Linnaeus updated his Systema Naturae for the tenth edition, he placed the Antillean crested hummingbird with the other hummingbirds in the genus Trochilus. Linnaeus included a brief description, coined the binomial name Trochilus cristatus and cited Edwards' work. The Antillean crested hummingbird is now the only species placed in the genus Orthorhyncus that was introduced in 1799 by Bernard Germain de Lacépède. The type locality is restricted to the island of Barbados. The genus name combines the Ancient Greek orthos meaning "straight" and "rhunkhos" meaning "bill". The specific epithet cristatus is Latin meaning "crested" or "plumed".

Four subspecies are recognised:

- O. c. exilis (Gmelin, JF 1788) – Puerto Rico south through Lesser Antilles to Saint Lucia
- O. c. ornatus Gould, 1861 – Saint Vincent
- O. c. cristatus (Linnaeus, 1758) – Barbados. One study found that this subspecies showed considerable sequence divergence from the Saint Lucia and Saint Vincent subspecies. This population may have invaded Barbados from an island other than Saint Lucia or Saint Vincent, but confirmation of this possibility requires a more complete phylogeographic survey. This population has been flagged as a potentially invasive species on Barbados.
- O. c. emigrans Lawrence, 1877 – Grenadines and Grenada

== Description ==
As the name implies, Antillean crested hummingbird is one of the few hummingbirds with a crest. It demonstrates the general sexual dimorphism for hummingbirds where the male is bright and colorful whilst the female is more tannish and dull. Males have a short straight black bill; head with green crest, tipped metallic green to bright blue-green, upperparts dull metallic bronze-green; underparts sooty black; tail black, rounded. The female bill is similar to male's but its head is without a crest; the forehead, crown and upperparts are metallic bronzy-green; underparts light grey; tail blackish, rounded, four outer rectrices broadly tipped whitish grey.

The subspecies can be distinguished by the colour of their crests: exilis is wholly green or slightly tinged blue on tip; ornatus has the terminal portion abruptly blue; cristatus is golden to emerald, violet terminally; emigrans is similar to the nominate but more bluish violet, throat paler grey; the degree of paleness in underparts of female varies with race.

Calls include short "tsip" or "tzip" notes and a longer series of "tslee-tslee-tslee-tslee".

== Distribution and habitat ==
Its natural habitats are subtropical or tropical moist lowland forest, semiarid forest and heavily degraded former forest such as open vegetation, parks, plantations, forest borders from sea-level to high mountains. Commonest below 500 m. It lives a sedentary lifestyle, with possible dispersal to higher altitudes in Jul/Aug. Subspecies exilis is rare straggler to the United States.

== Behavior ==
This species holds the first record of any avian species that became prey to an amblypygid, otherwise known as a tailless whipscorpion; it is unclear though whether or not the amblypygid caught the bird as the animal was already observed deceased. The Antillean crested hummingbird had also been observed attacking the nest of a saddled anoles (Anolis stratulus). The antillean crested hummingbird and many other trochilid hummingbirds display agonistic behavior towards not only other species of hummingbirds but also other noncompetitor bird species, reptiles and insects, which can have for effect to locally reduce biotic diversity and associated ecosystem services.

=== Breeding ===
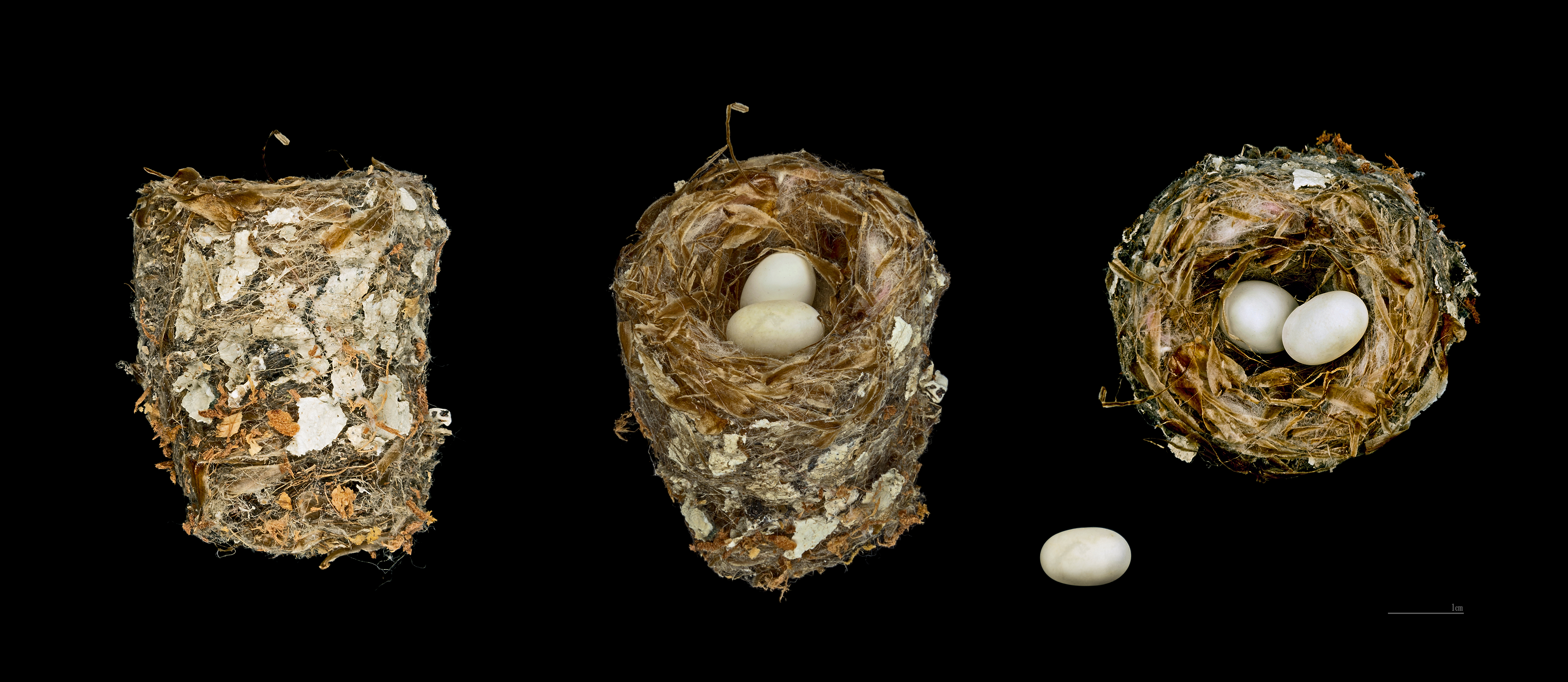
Nest and eggs MHNT

The Antillean crested hummingbird breeds all year round, but mainly from March–June. Its nest is cup-shaped, built on thin branches of shrub or vine 1–3 m above ground, often shaded by leaves. The nest interior is lined with soft plant fibre and the outside decorated with pieces of dead leaves, lichens, moss or bark. Clutch size is of two white eggs, size 11·6 mm × 8–8·2 mm; incubation is 17–19 days done by the female who will also persistently attack intruders; chicks are a darkish grey with two dorsal rows of down; fledging period is about 19–21 days; young remain with female for 3–4 weeks; single brood. They first begin to breed in their second year.

=== Food and feeding ===
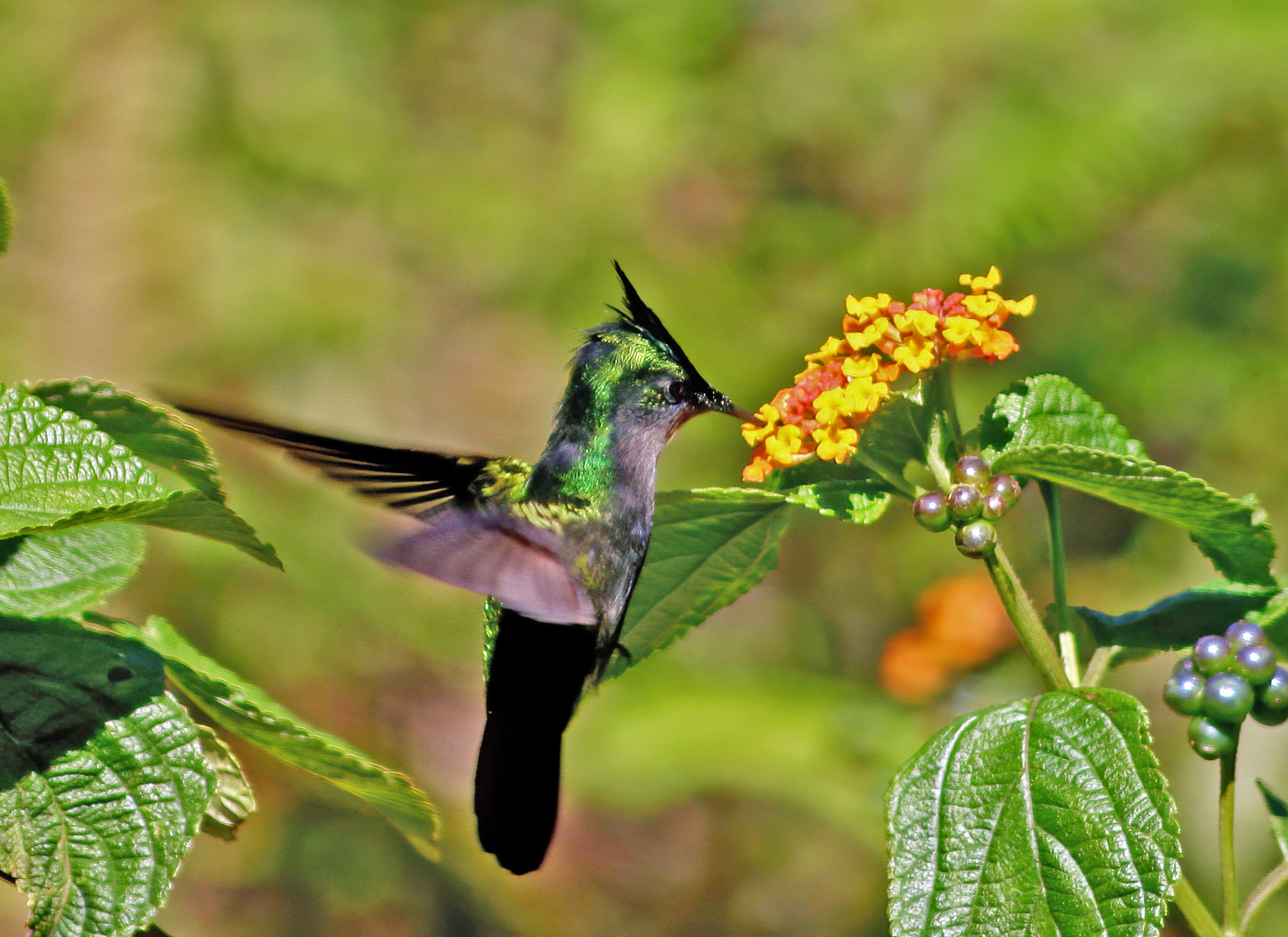
Feeding at a flower in Dominica

Its diet consists of arthropods and nectar as flowering shrubs (Lantana, Euphorbia), vines and from lower parts of hedges and large flowering trees such as the capparis tree; others include Hibiscus, Bauhinia, Tabebuia, Delonix. Antillean Crested Hummingbird feed from near the ground and up to the canopy of tall trees but appear to prefer flowering plants of the understory. Small arthropods may be collected from plant surfaces or hawked for in air.

== Conservation status ==
Not globally threatened (Least Concern). CITES II. Restricted-range species: present in Puerto Rico and the Virgin Islands EBA and Lesser Antilles EBA. Common resident. Particularly common at sea-level, with densities of at least 6–10 pairs/km^{2} on St Lucia, at least 4 to 8 pairs/km^{2} on Guadeloupe, and at least 3 to 5 pairs/km^{2} on Dominica. Widespread throughout Lesser Antilles, occurring at all altitudes and in all habitat types; ready occupation of man-made habitats suggests that habitat loss is unlikely to be a problem.
