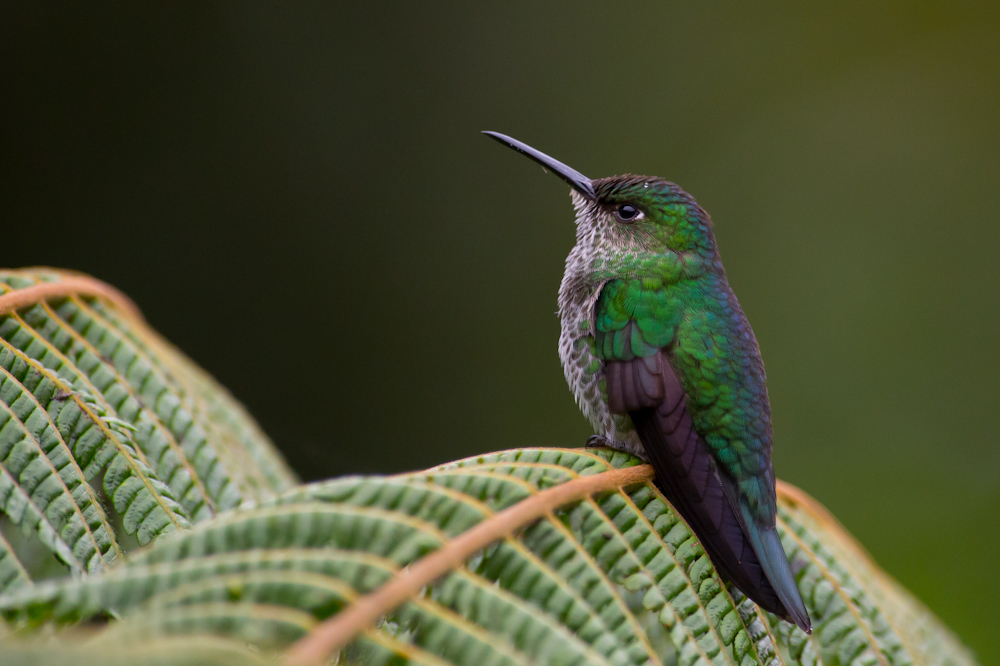

Conservation status
- Least Concern (IUCN 3.1)
- CITES Appendix II (CITES)

Scientific classification
- Kingdom: Animalia
- Phylum: Chordata
- Class: Aves
- Clade: Strisores
- Order: Apodiformes
- Family: Trochilidae
- Tribe: Trochilini
- Genus: Taphrospilus; Simon, 1910
- Species: T. hypostictus

Binomial name
- Taphrospilus hypostictus (Gould, 1862)
- Range map

Synonyms
- Talaphorus hypostictus, Leucippus hypostictus

= Many-spotted hummingbird =

The many-spotted hummingbird (Taphrospilus hypostictus) is a species of hummingbird in the "emeralds", tribe Trochilini of subfamily Trochilinae. It is found in Bolivia, Colombia, Ecuador, Peru, and possibly Argentina.

== Taxonomy and systematics ==
The many-spotted hummingbird is the only member of genus Taphrospilus and has no subspecies. However, some authors have placed it in genus Talaphorus which others merged into Leucippus.

== Description ==
The many-spotted hummingbird is 10.5 to 11.4 cm (4.1 to 4.5 in) long and weighs 6.7 to 9 g (0.24 to 0.32 oz). Both sexes have a slightly decurved black bill about 2.3 cm (0.91 in) long, and their plumage is very similar. Adults' upperparts are grass green to coppery bronze and the underparts white. The underparts except the central belly are thickly spotted with green, the female's somewhat less heavily. Their tail is blue-green with dusky gray tips to the feathers. Juveniles are the same with the addition of buffy fringes on the head feathers.

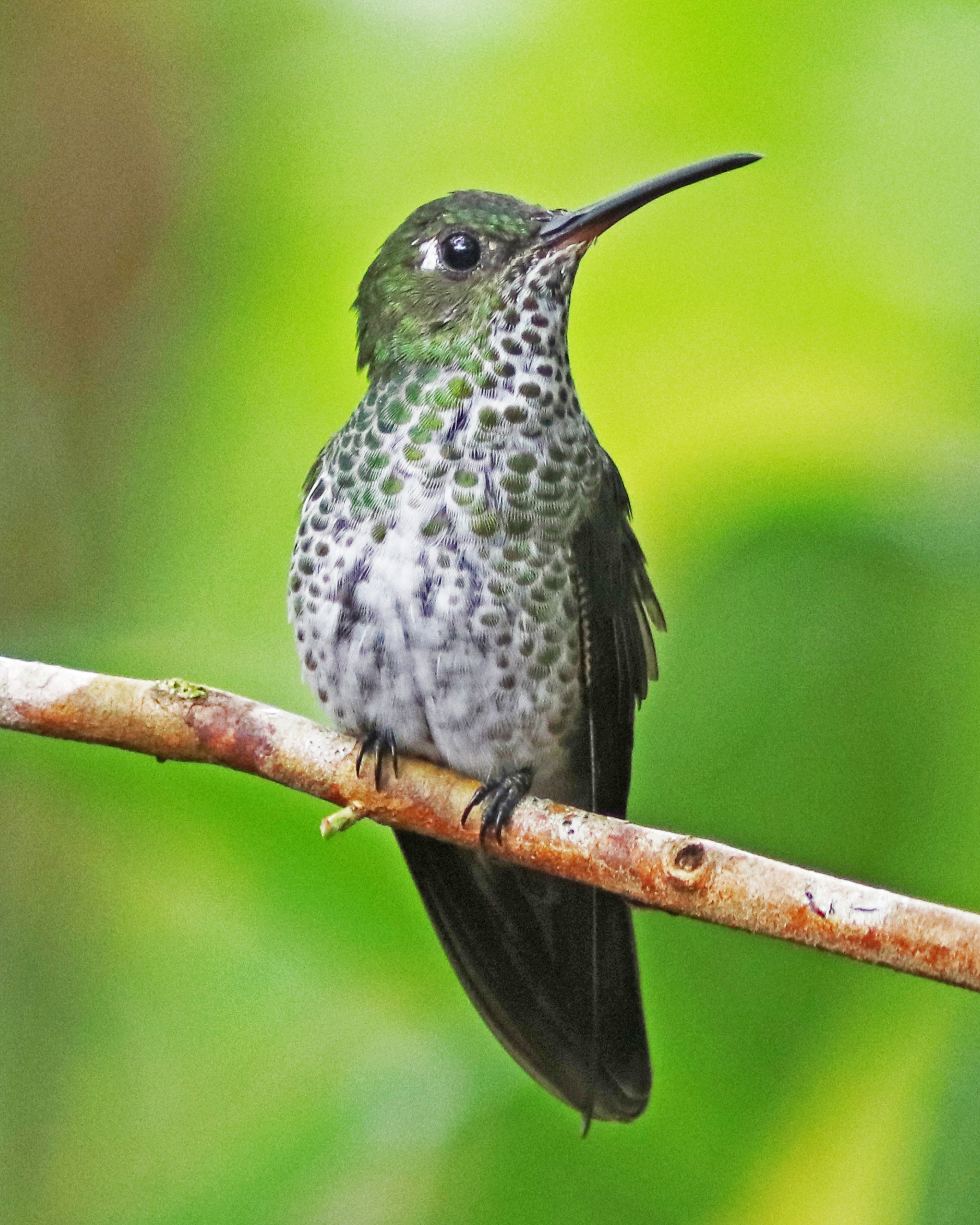

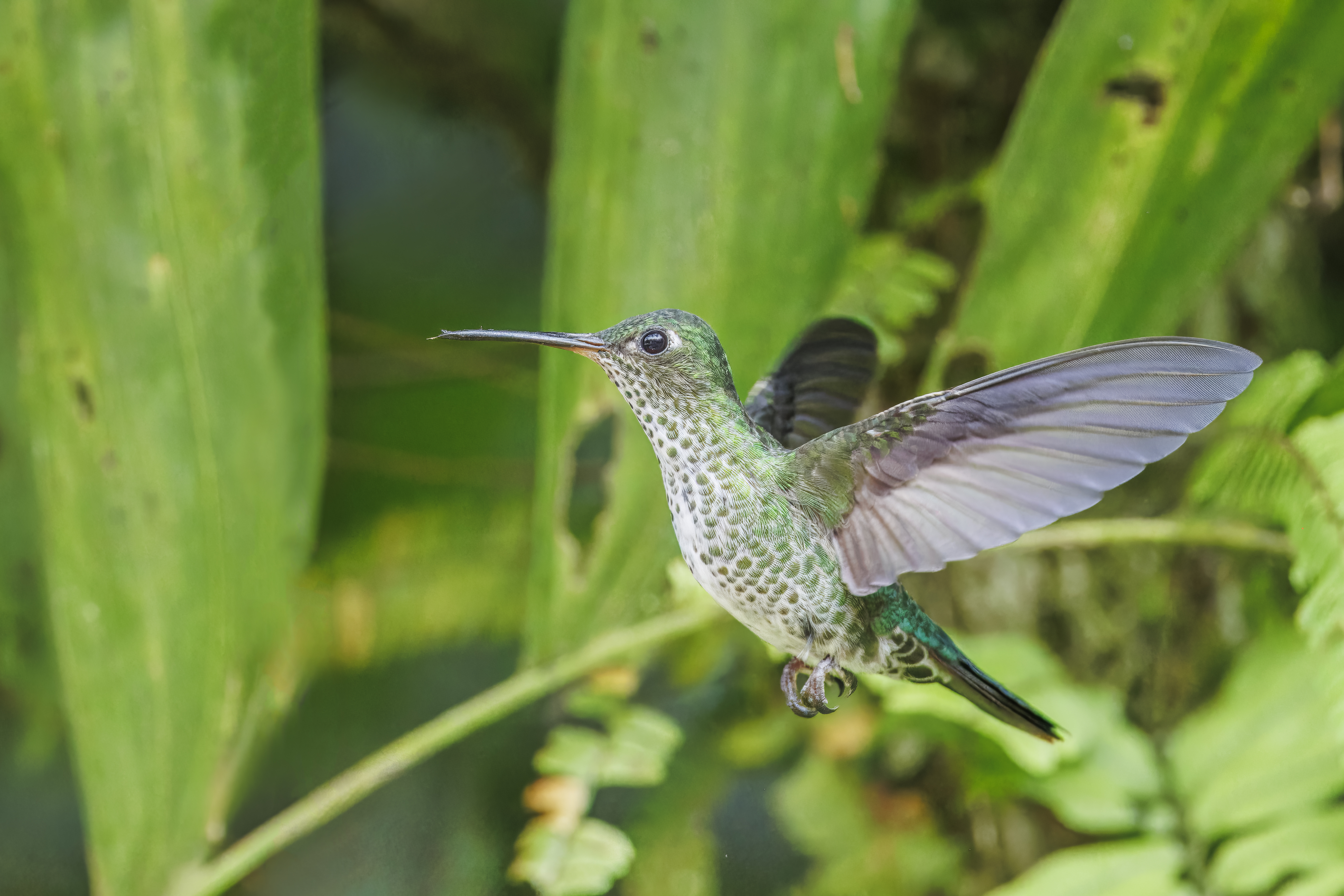

== Distribution and habitat ==
The many-spotted hummingbird's primary range is the eastern slope of the Andes from Ecuador's Napo Province through eastern Peru into central Bolivia. It has also been documented in southern Colombia. The International Ornithological Committee places it Brazil and the Clements taxonomy in Argentina. However, the South American Classification Committee of the American Ornithological Society has no records from Brazil; undocumented sight records from Argentina lead the committee to list it as hypothetical in that country.

The many-spotted hummingbird inhabits the interior and edges of humid foothill and subtropical forest, favoring small ravines. In elevation it mostly ranges between 400 and 1,500 m (1,300 and 4,900 ft) but has been found as high as 2,800 m (9,200 ft) in Peru. It is most numerous around 600 m (2,000 ft).

== Behavior ==
=== Movement ===
The many-spotted hummingbird is a year-round resident throughout its range.

=== Feeding ===
The many-spotted hummingbird forages for nectar at a variety of flowering trees, shrubs, vines, and terrestrial bromeliads. It usually does so alone, but at feeders will associate with other hummingbirds. In addition to nectar it feeds on small insects captured by hawking from a perch.

=== Breeding ===
The many-spotted hummingbird's breeding season appears to span from January to May. It makes a bulky cup nest of fine rootlets and moss and usually attaches it to a tree trunk within about 0.5 m (2 ft) of the ground. The female incubates the clutch of two eggs for 14 to 15 days and fledging occurs 20 to 22 days after hatch.

=== Vocalization ===
The many-spotted hummingbird's song is a "quiet series of wheezy, electric warbles and gravelly-sounding chatters". It also makes calls described as "a thin-sounding 'chit' and a wheezy 'dew dew dew'."

== Status ==
The IUCN has assessed the many-spotted hummingbird as being of Least Concern. It has a large range, but its population size is unknown and believed to be decreasing. No immediate threats have been identified. It is considered generally common, though in Ecuador only "scarce to locally common".
