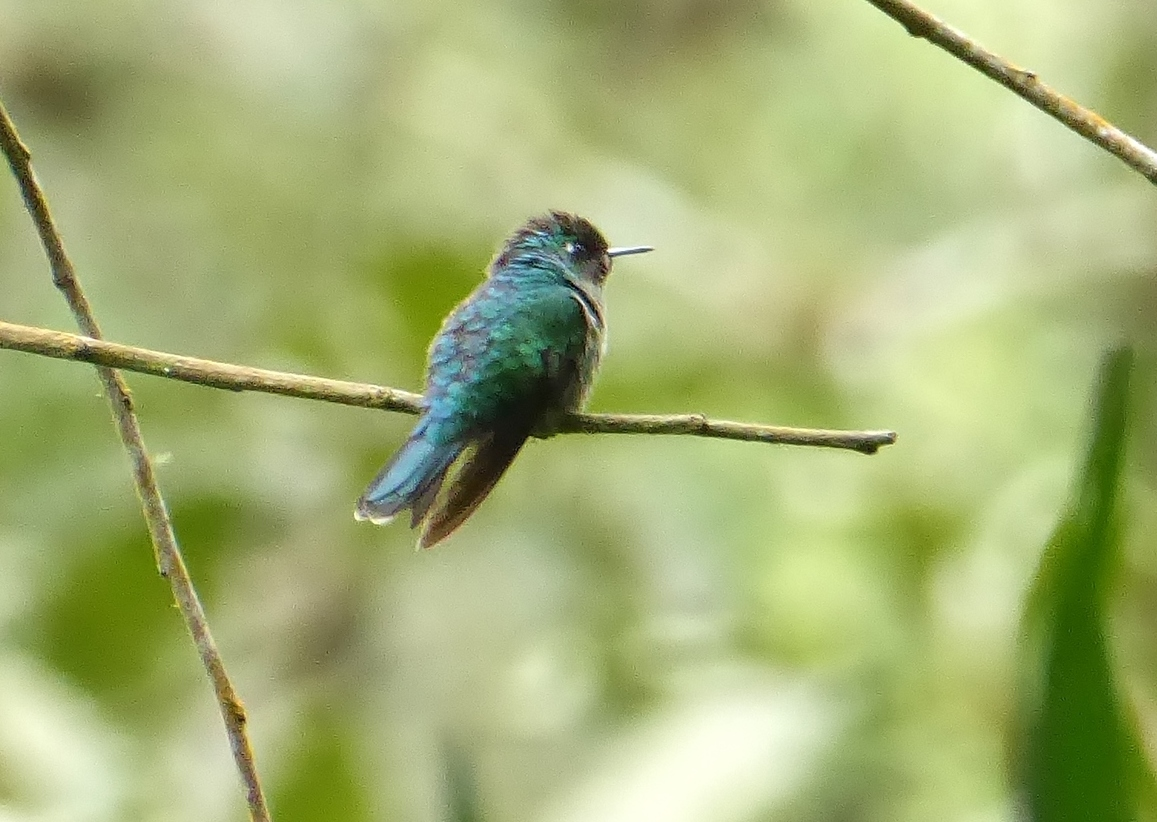

Conservation status
- Least Concern (IUCN 3.1)
- CITES Appendix II

Scientific classification
- Kingdom: Animalia
- Phylum: Chordata
- Class: Aves
- Order: Apodiformes
- Family: Trochilidae
- Tribe: Trochilini
- Genus: Abeillia; Bonaparte, 1850
- Species: A. abeillei

Binomial name
- Abeillia abeillei (Lesson & Delattre, 1839)

Subspecies
- Abeillia abeillei abeillei Abeillia abeillei aurea
- Global range in green

= Emerald-chinned hummingbird =

Species of bird

The emerald-chinned hummingbird (Abeillia abeillei) is a species of hummingbird in the "emeralds", tribe Trochilini of subfamily Trochilinae.

It is native to montane areas of southern Mexico, El Salvador, Guatemala, Honduras and Nicaragua.

== Taxonomy and systematics ==
The emerald-chinned hummingbird is the only member of genus Abeillia. It has two subspecies, the nominate A. a. abeillei and A. a. aurea.

== Description ==
The emerald-chinned hummingbird is 7 to 8.6 cm (2.8 to 3.4 in) long and weighs about 2.7 to 3.5 g (0.095 to 0.12 oz). Both sexes of both subspecies have a short, straight, dull black bill. The nominate adult male has metallic bronze green to greenish bronze upperparts. Its central pair of tail feathers are bronze green and the rest black with a faint bluish or bronzy gloss. All have brownish gray tips. Its face has a bold white spot behind the eye. Its chin and upper throat are brilliant metallic emerald green and the lower throat velvety black to dusky metallic bronze green. The rest of its underparts are deep brownish gray with some metallic bronze green gloss except on the belly. The undertail coverts are metallic bronze green with wide brownish gray edges to the feathers. Nominate females are similar to the male but lack the metallic throat. Their underparts are entirely pale gray with some metallic green spots on the sides. Subspecies A. a. aurea is smaller than the nominate. Where the nominate male is bronze green, this subspecies is golden green.

== Distribution and habitat ==
The nominate subspecies of emerald-chinned hummingbird is found discontinuously from Veracruz in southern Mexico through Guatemala into northern Honduras. A. a. aurea is found from southern Honduras into northern Nicaragua. The species inhabits the interior and edges of humid evergreen montane forest and pine-evergreen forest. In elevation it ranges between 1,000 and 2,200 m (3,300 and 7,200 ft).

== Behavior ==
=== Movement ===
The emerald-chinned hummingbird's movements, if any, are not known.

=== Feeding ===
The emerald-chinned hummingbird forages low to the ground for nectar, usually in cover. Its diet has not been detailed but is known to include the flowers of Rubiaceae, Verbenaceae, and Oenotheraceae. Males defend clusters of flowers. In addition to nectar, the species feeds on small insects that it gleans from flowers, leaves, and tree trunks while hovering.

=== Breeding ===
Little is known about the emerald-chinned hummingbird's breeding phenology. It is reported to nest in Mexico during February and March, and to build a cup nest low in the forest understory. Its incubation length and time to fledging are not known.

=== Vocalization ===
The emerald-chinned hummingbird's song is "a high, thin, slightly squeaking chipping, tsin, tisn-tsin tsin-tsin tsin-tsin, or tsi tsi tsi-si, tsi-tsi tsi tsi-tsi..." When foraging it gives "a liquid, rattling trill ... at times only single notes given, puip puip" and when perched "a sharp sii'ing".

== Status ==
The IUCN has assessed the emerald-chinned hummingbird as being of Least Concern, though it population size is not known and is believed to be decreasing. It has "Special Protection" status in Mexico because its habitat there is under threat. "The primary threats to this species are logging of mature forests, and habitat conversion for agriculture and livestock production."
