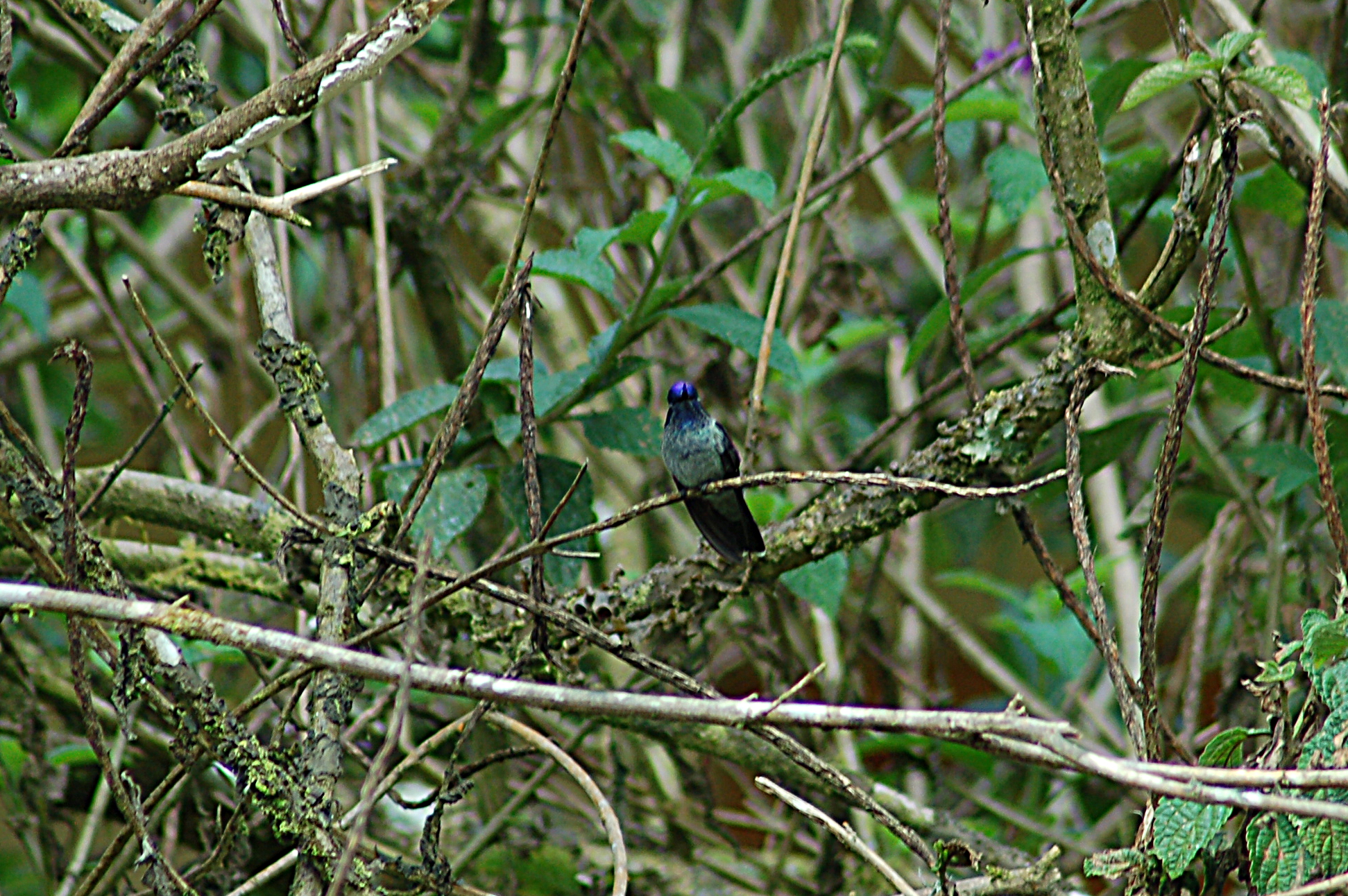

Conservation status
- Least Concern (IUCN 3.1)
- CITES Appendix II

Scientific classification
- Kingdom: Animalia
- Phylum: Chordata
- Class: Aves
- Clade: Strisores
- Order: Apodiformes
- Family: Trochilidae
- Tribe: Trochilini
- Genus: Klais; Reichenbach, 1854
- Species: K. guimeti

Binomial name
- Klais guimeti (Bourcier, 1843)
- Range of K. guimeti

= Violet-headed hummingbird =

Species of bird

The violet-headed hummingbird (Klais guimeti) is a species of hummingbird in the family Trochilidae. It is the only species in the genus Klais.

Its natural habitats are subtropical or tropical moist lowland forest, subtropical or tropical moist montane forest, and heavily degraded former forest.

== Taxonomy ==
The violet-headed hummingbird was formally described in 1843 by the French ornithologist Jules Bourcier from specimens collected near Caracas in Venezuela. Bourcier coined the binomial name Trochilus guimeti. The violet-headed hummingbird is now the only species placed in the genus Klais that was introduced in 1854 by the German naturalist Ludwig Reichenbach. The genus is named after Kleis (or Cleis), the daughter of the Lesbian poet Sappho. The specific name was chosen to honour the French chemist Jean-Baptiste Guimet.

Three subspecies are recognised:

- K. g. merrittii (Lawrence, 1860) – east Honduras to east Panama
- K. g. guimeti (Bourcier, 1843) – east Colombia and north Venezuela to east Ecuador and extreme north Peru
- K. g. pallidiventris Stolzmann, 1926 – east Peru and west Bolivia

== Description ==
Violet-headed hummingbirds are on average 8.1 cm (3.2 in) in length with a short, straight bill that averages 13 mm (0.51 in) in length. The head and throat of the male are intense violet or blue (depending on the angle viewed) with white spots behind each eye that stands out against the dark head. The back is metallic bluish-green (or bronze-green depending on the angle) and breast is green fading to a grey belly. The tail is green with tiny white-grey tail spots. The wings are black.

The female is duller with a blue cap, green back and grey throat, breast and belly. The wings and tail are the same as the male. The female also has the white spot behind the eye.

== Distribution and habitat ==
The violet-headed hummingbird ranges from Central America well into South America. This includes Honduras, Nicaragua, Costa Rica and Panama in Central America and western Venezuela, Colombia, Ecuador, Peru, northern Brazil, western Venezuela and northern Bolivia. The species tends to be local in distribution, common in some areas and rare in other seemingly identical areas.

The violet-headed hummingbird occurs in the mountains and has been recorded to occur from 200 to 850 m (660 to 2,790 ft) in Costa Rica, from 400 to 1,850 m (1,310 to 6,070 ft) in Colombia and 150 to 1,900 m (490 to 6,230 ft) in Venezuela.

Violet-headed hummingbirds are found on the edges of humid primary forest, openings in secondary forests, in shrub and thicket clearings and in various human modified habitat such as Stachytarpheta hedges in Costa Rica and shade-grown coffee plantations in Venezuela.

== Behaviour ==
=== Breeding ===
In Costa Rica, males sing in loose leks beginning in October and intensifying until the breeding season in December. The chorus continues until the dry season causes the flowers to disappear in February and March. The chorus picks up again when the rains begin again in April, but the heavy rains of May shut the chorus down again until October. The leks are located 5 to 18 m (16 to 59 ft) above the ground on the edge of clearings where the males sing conspicuously from slender dead twigs. Occasionally, an individual will sing solo without other violet-headed hummingbirds nearby.

The nest is a mossy cup built 1 to 5 m (3.3 to 16.4 ft) above forested mountain streams. They are normally built in February, but sometimes as early as January. The last young fledge in May.

=== Food and feeding ===
The violet-headed hummingbird drinks nectar from understory flowering shrubs as well as taking small insects on the wing. In Costa Rica, a particular fondness for Stachytarpheta flowers has been reported with as many as one individual every 5–7 m (16–23 ft) on a hedge near Murcia.

== Relationship with humans ==
The violet-headed hummingbird has been designated as a species of Least Concern due to its large range and ability to exist in human modified habitat. The flowering shrubs near Murcia, Costa Rica, were reported to be in an area cleared for agriculture with very few trees.

== Sources ==
- Dunning, John S.; Ridgely, Robert S. (1982). South American Land Birds: A Photographic Aid to Identification. Harrowood Books. ISBN 978-0-915180-22-6.
- Hilty, Steven L.; Brown, William L. (1986). Guide to the Birds of Colombia. Princeton University Press. ISBN 978-0-691-08372-8.
- Jones, Jason; Ramoni-Perazzi, Paolo; Carruthers, Erin H.; Robertson, Raleigh (2002). "Species composition of bird communities in shade coffee plantations in the Venezuelan Andes" (PDF). Ornithologia Neotropical. 13: 397–412.
- de Schauensee, Rodolphe Meyer; Phelps, William H. (1978). A Guide to the Birds of Venezuela. Princeton University Press. ISBN 978-0-691-08205-9.
- Skutch, Alexander F. (1958). "Life history of the Violet-headed Hummingbird" (PDF). Wilson Bulletin. 70 (1): 5–19.
