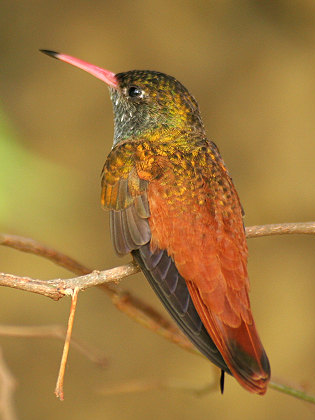

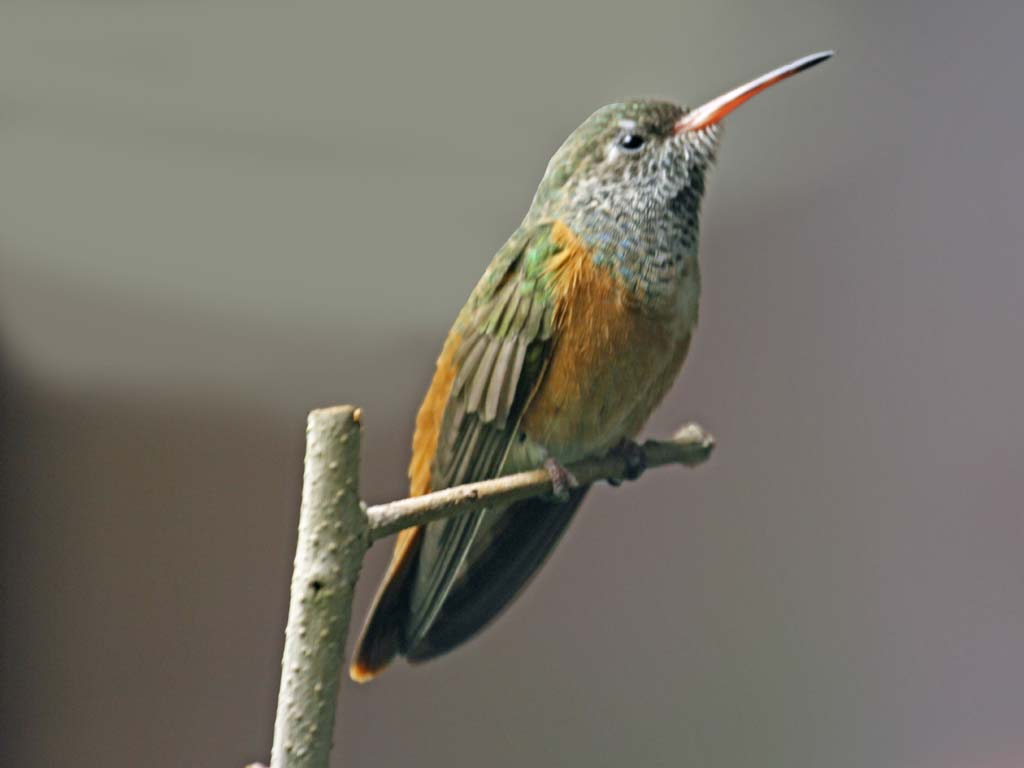

Conservation status
- Least Concern (IUCN 3.1)
- CITES Appendix II

Scientific classification
- Kingdom: Animalia
- Phylum: Chordata
- Class: Aves
- Order: Apodiformes
- Family: Trochilidae
- Tribe: Trochilini
- Genus: Amazilis; Gray, GR, 1855
- Species: A. amazilia

Binomial name
- Amazilis amazilia (Lesson & Garnot, 1827)

Synonyms
- Amazilia amazilia

Audio
- Song of amazilia hummingbird

= Amazilia hummingbird =

Species of bird

The amazilia hummingbird (Amazilis amazilia) is a hummingbird in the "emeralds", tribe Trochilini of subfamily Trochilinae. It is the only species placed in the genus Amazilis. It is found in Ecuador and Peru. Its six subspecies differ primarily in their throat and belly colors.

== Taxonomy ==
An illustration of the amazilia hummingbird together with the binomial name Orthorynchus amazilia was published in 1827 by the French naturalist René Lesson. In the following year he published a description. The specific epithet is from the name of the Inca heroine in Jean-François Marmontel's novel Les Incas, ou la destruction de l'Empire du Pérou.

The amazilia hummingbird was formerly placed in the genus Amazilia. A molecular phylogenetic study published in 2014 found that the genus was polyphyletic. In the revised classification to create monophyletic genera, the amazilia hummingbird was moved by most taxonomic authorities to the resurrected genus Amazilis that had been introduced in 1855 by George Gray. However, BirdLife International's Handbook of the Birds of the World retains it in Amazilia.

There are six generally recognized subspecies:

- A. a. alticola (Gould, 1860) – south Ecuador
- A. a. azuay (Krabbe & Ridgely, 2010) – southwest Ecuador
- A. a. dumerilii (Lesson, RP, 1832) – west Ecuador and northwest Peru
- A. a. leucophoea (Reichenbach, 1854) – northwest Peru
- A. a. amazilia (Lesson & Garnot, 1827) – west Peru
- A. a. caeruleigularis (Carriker, 1933) – southwest Peru

Some ornithologists have proposed that subspecies A. a. alticola should be treated as a separate species, the "Loja hummingbird".

== Description ==
The amazilia hummingbird is 9 to 11 cm (3.5 to 4.3 in) long. Males weigh 5 to 6.5 g (0.18 to 0.23 oz) and females 4.5 to 5.5 g (0.16 to 0.19 oz). Both sexes of all subspecies have a straight, medium length, pinkish-red bill with a black tip. Adult males of the nominate subspecies A. a. amazilia have golden-green upperparts with rufous uppertail coverts. Their tail is also mostly rufous, with some bronze-green on the outer feathers. They have a glittering golden- to turquoise-green throat and a rufous lower breast and belly. Adult females have almost the same plumage, with the addition of some white on the chin and throat and a paler rufous belly. Juveniles resemble adult females with the addition of browish edges on their upperparts' feathers.

The amazilia hummingbird's song is "a variable but typically descending series of 4–10 squeaky notes, repeated at intervals." There are differences within and among the subspecies, especially that of A. a. alticola compared to the others. The species makes calls described as "tsip" and "dry 'zrrt'"; sometimes they are extended as "stuttering rattles".

Subspecies A. a. alticola has less rufous on the breast than the nominate and almost no green on the tail. A. a. azuay differs the most from the nominate. Its bill has less red on the maxilla, it has a nearly pure white belly with rufous only on the lower flanks, and its uppertail coverts and tail are paler rufous with little green. A. a. dumerilii is somewhat smaller than the nominate, with a white chin, throat, and center of the belly. A. a. leucophoea looks almost the same as demerillii but has bronze-green upperparts. A. a. caeruleigularis has a glittering violet-blue throat instead of the nominate's green.

== Distribution and habitat ==
The amazilia hummingbird is found in western Ecuador and Peru. It does not migrate but does make some elevational dispersal after the breeding season. The six subspecies are distributed thus:

- A. a. alticola, Andes of southern Ecuador's El Oro, Loja, and Zamora-Chinchipe provinces
- A. a. azuay, south-central Ecuador, in the Jubones River basin of Azuay and Loja provinces
- A. a. dumerilii, Andean lowlands from western Ecuador into Tumbes Department of northwestern Peru
- A. a. leucophoea, northwestern Peru between Piura and Ancash departments
- A. a. amazilia, western Peru in Lima and Ica departments
- A. a. caeruleigularis, the Nazca valley in southwestern Peru

The amazilia hummingbird's habitat is different from that of its close relatives in the genus Amazilia: It is a bird of open semi-arid to arid landscapes and is rarely found deep in forested areas. These landscapes include scrublands, thorn forest, xerophytic steppe, and desert. The species is also common in cultivated areas and city parks and gardens. The nominate subspecies is found between sea level and about 1,000 m (3,300 ft). Subspecies dumerilii, leucophaea, and alticola are also found in the sub-montane zone in savanna and at the edges and clearings of cloudforest. In elevation they mostly range between 1,000 and 2,200 m (3,300 and 7,200 ft), though leucophaea reaches as high as 2,700 m (8,900 ft). A. a. caeruleigularis is apparently restricted to near-desert between 600 and 700 m (2,000 and 2,300 ft).

== Behavior ==
=== Feeding ===
The amazilia hummingbird forages for nectar at a variety of plants with medium-length flowers; some examples include Erythrina, Psittacanthus, Salvia, and Justicia. Males are territorial, defending feeding patches from other hummingbirds and bananaquits (Coereba flaveola). In addition to nectar it feeds on small insects and spiders. A time-budget study in Lima, Peru, showed that the species spent 80% of its time perched and about 15% foraging for nectar. It spent about 2% of its time defending feeding territories and only 0.3% hunting insects and drinking water.

=== Breeding ===
Most subspecies of the amazilia hummingbird breed at any month of the year; A. a. alticola apparently breeds only from November to March. Females build a cup nest of soft plant fibers bound with cobweb and sometimes with lichen on the outside. It generally places it on top of a flat branch and sometimes at the end of a branch, between about 1 and 2.5 m (3 and 8 ft) above the ground. In Ecuador nests were found in denser vegetation during the rainy season than in the dry one. The female incubates the clutch of two eggs for 16 to 18 days and fledging occurs 17 to 25 days after hatch.

== Status ==
The IUCN has assessed the amazilia hummingbird as being of Least Concern. It has a large range but its population size and trend are not known. No immediate threats have been identified. Overall it is considered uncommon to common. A. a. alticola has a restricted range and is locally common where the habitat is suitable, but deforestation is a potential threat. A. a. caeruleigularis has a very patchy distribution in its rather restricted range.
