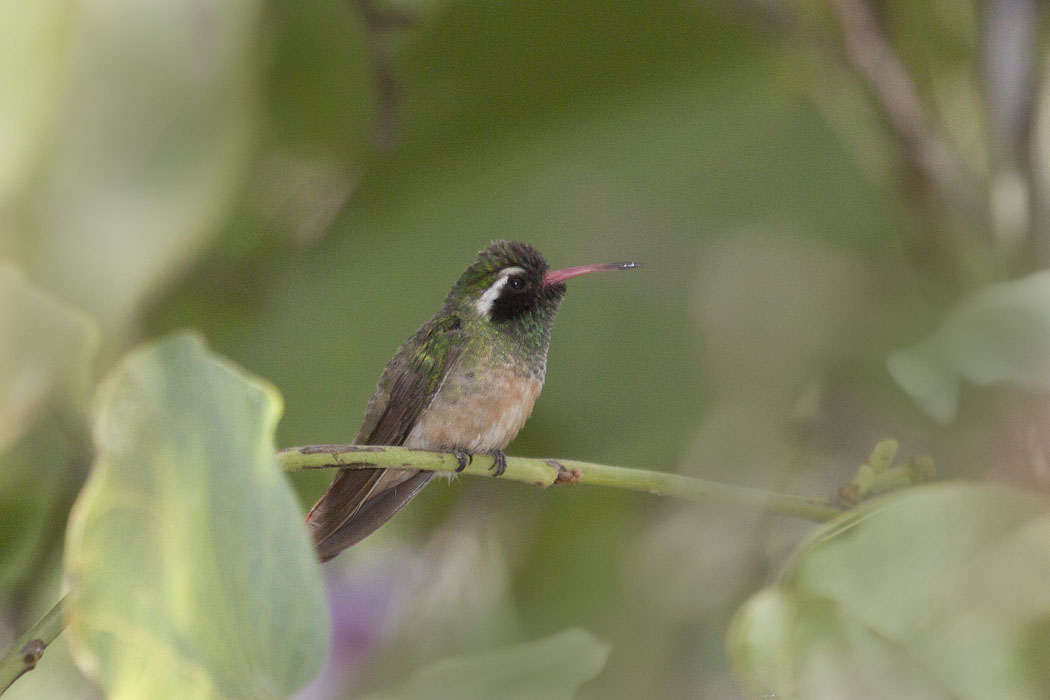

Conservation status
- Least Concern (IUCN 3.1)
- CITES Appendix II

Scientific classification
- Kingdom: Animalia
- Phylum: Chordata
- Class: Aves
- Clade: Strisores
- Order: Apodiformes
- Family: Trochilidae
- Genus: Basilinna
- Species: B. xantusii

Binomial name
- Basilinna xantusii (Lawrence, 1860)
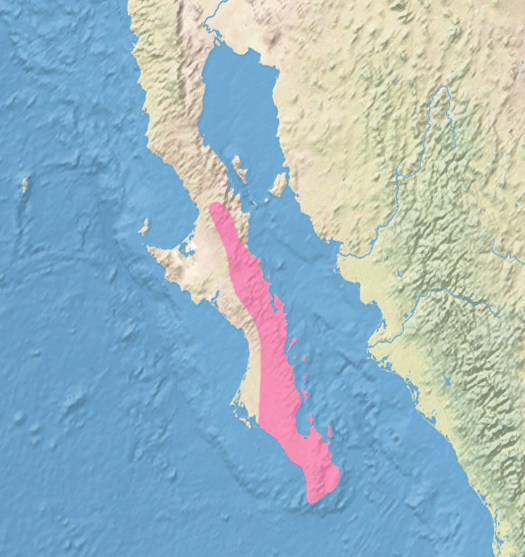
- Range of Xantus's hummingbird

Synonyms
- Hylocharis xantusii

= Xantus's hummingbird =

Xantus's hummingbird (Basilinna xantusii), previously known as the black-fronted hummingbird, is a species in the "emeralds", tribe Trochilini of subfamily Trochilinae. It is endemic to the Baja California Peninsula.

== Taxonomy and systematics ==
Xantus's hummingbird was early placed in genus Basilinna, which predated its discovery, then moved to genus Hylocharis, and then in the early 2000s moved back to Basilinna. It shares that genus only with the white-eared hummingbird (B. leucotis). It is monotypic.

It is named for John Xantus de Vesey (Xántus János), a Hungarian zoologist who collected the first specimen.

== Description ==
Xantus's hummingbird is 8.5 to 9.5 cm (3.3 to 3.7 in) long. Males weigh an average of 3.5 g (0.12 oz) and females 3.4 g (0.12 oz). Their bills are straight and about 1.7 cm (0.67 in) long; males' are red with a black tip. Females' maxilla is black with a pinkish base and their mandible pinkish red with a black tip. Males have a golden green to emerald green crown, nape, and upperparts with rufous edging on the uppertail coverts. Their forehead and chin are black, their face mostly black with a wide white stripe behind the eye, and their throat iridescent emerald green. Their underparts are cinnamon with some green mottling on the flanks and pale cinnamon undertail coverts. Their tail is rufous chestnut; the innermost pair of feathers have wide iridescent green edges and the other four pairs thin green edges. The females' face is blackish brown with a pale buffy stripe behind the eye. Their forehead is dull brownish and their upperparts iridescent golden green with some rufous edging on the uppertail coverts. The underparts including the throat and undertail coverts are pale to medium cinnamon. Their tail's central pair of feathers are golden green with a rufous shaft and the other four pairs dark rufous that pales towards the end, a black and bronzy green band near the end, and thin white tips.

== Distribution and habitat ==
Xantus's hummingbird is found from central Baja California south to the peninsula's tip. It has also been recorded as a vagrant twice in California and once in British Columbia. The species inhabits arid woodlands of scrub, oak, and pine-oak at elevations between 150 and 1,500 m (490 and 4,900 ft) and also visits coastal desert, gardens, and feeders.

== Behavior ==
=== Movement ===
Xantus's hummingbird's movement patterns have not been fully documented. It breeds in montane forests and after nesting apparently moves as far down as sea level but does not entirely vacate the lower elevation forest. It may move south from the more northerly part of its range and it probably moves locally to be where plants are flowering. Genetic analyses suggested that female birds disperse more than males, resulting in female-mediated gene flow from north to south.

=== Feeding ===
Xantus's hummingbird forages for nectar at a very wide variety of flowering plants, shrubs and trees, and feeds at all levels of the vegetation. It defends feeding territories. It has been noted as a major pollinator of madrone (Arbutus peninsularis), a preferred nectar source. In addition to nectar, it also feeds on small insects captured in flight and by gleaning from vegetation.

=== Breeding ===
Xantus's hummingbird breeds between July and September or October in the northern part of its range and February to April in the south with a gradient between the areas. The nest is a cup of fine plant fibers, other plant materials, and small feathers bound with spiderweb and decorated with lichen and bark. It is usually suspended from the end of a thin branch within about 1 to 2 m (3 to 7 ft) above the ground or often above water. The female incubates the clutch of two eggs for 15 to 16 days and fledging occurs about 22 days after hatch.

=== Vocalization ===
The male Xantus's hummingbird sings from within or under a bush, "a quiet, rough, gurgling warble, at times interspersed with rattles...and high, squeaky notes." The species' calls include "a low, fairly fast-paced, dry to slightly wet rattle, trrrrr or trrrt, "slightly tinny to slightly squeaky chips, ts tii-tii-tii, or tsi-ti ti-ti-ti-ti-ti-ti during an aggressive chase, and sometimes "a metallic chi-ti or ti-tink".

== Status ==
The IUCN has assessed Xantus's hummingbird as being of Least Concern. Though it has a relatively limited range, its population is estimated at between 20,000 and 50,000 mature individuals and is believed to be stable. "Although relatively sparse human population of s. Baja California might suggest that grazing pressures (or other human impacts) are relatively light, critical studies are needed."
