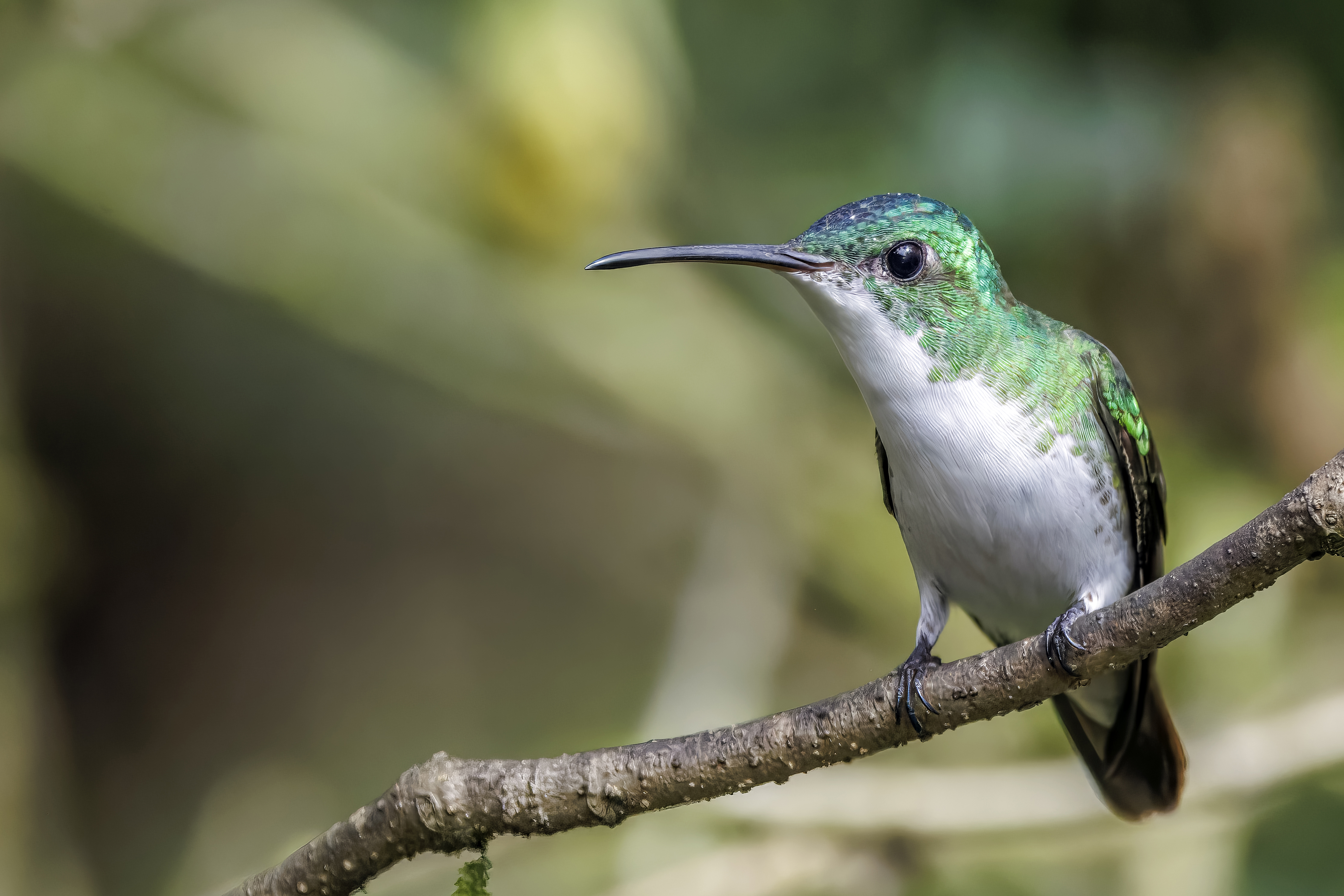
- male U. f. viridiceps, Ecuador

Conservation status
- Least Concern (IUCN 3.1)
- CITES Appendix II

Scientific classification
- Kingdom: Animalia
- Phylum: Chordata
- Class: Aves
- Clade: Strisores
- Order: Apodiformes
- Family: Trochilidae
- Subfamily: Trochilinae
- Tribe: Trochilini
- Genus: Uranomitra; Reichenbach, 1854
- Species: U. franciae

Binomial name
- Uranomitra franciae (Bourcier & Mulsant, 1846)

Synonyms
- Amazilia franciae

= Andean emerald =

Species of hummingbird

The Andean emerald (Uranomitra franciae) is a species of hummingbird in the "emeralds", tribe Trochilini of subfamily Trochilinae. It is found in Colombia, Ecuador, and Peru.

== Taxonomy and systematics ==
The Andean emerald was formerly placed in the genus Amazilia. A molecular phylogenetic study published in 2014 found that the genus Amazilia was polyphyletic. In the revised classification to create monophyletic genera, the Andean emerald was moved by most taxonomic systems to the resurrected genus Uranomitra that had been introduced in 1854 by Ludwig Reichenbach. However, BirdLife International's Handbook of the Birds of the World (HBW) retains it in Amazilia.

The Andean emerald is the only species in genus Uranomitra. These three subspecies are recognized:

- U. f. franciae (Bourcier & Mulsant, 1846)
- U. f. viridiceps (Gould, 1860)
- U. f. cyanocollis (Gould, 1853)
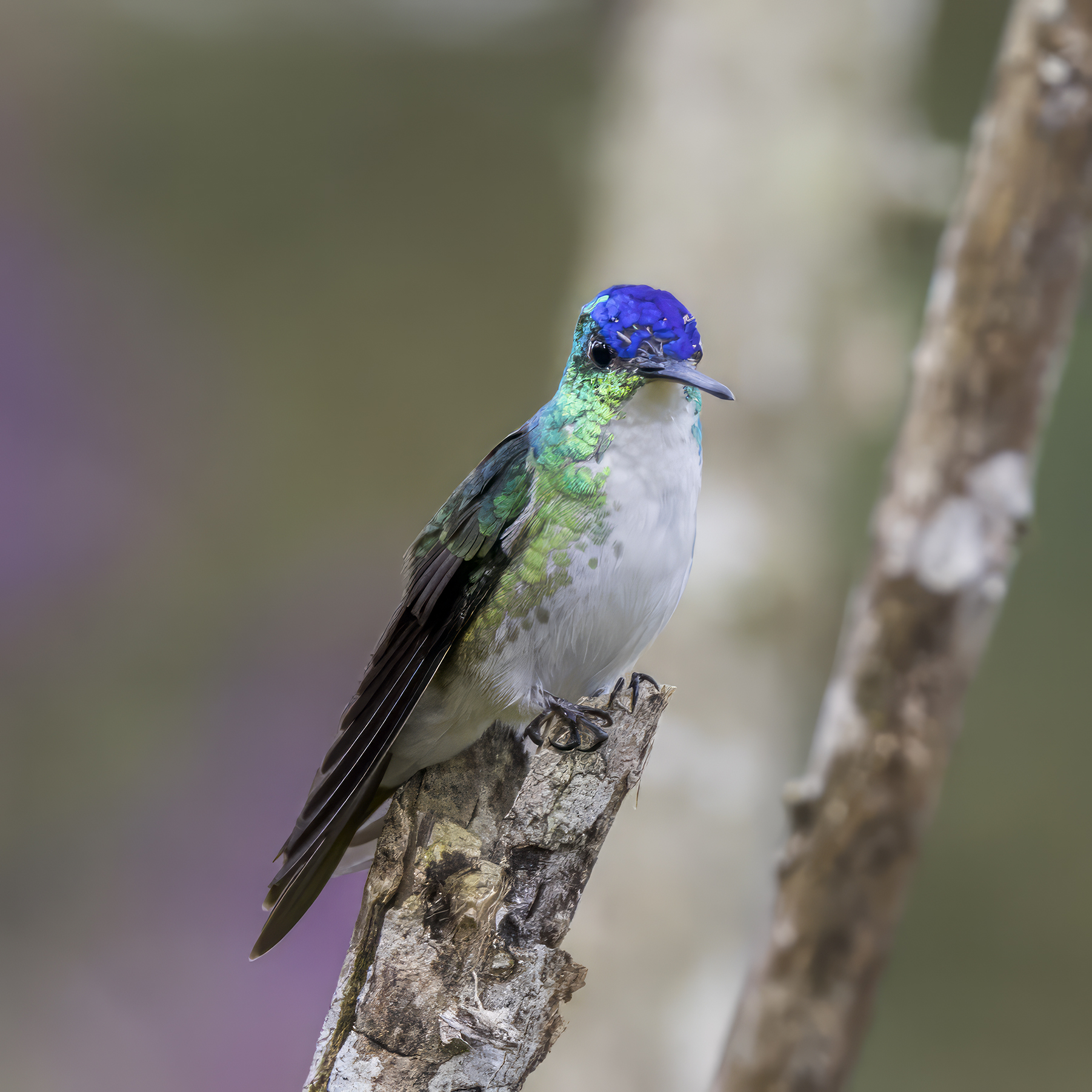
male U. f. franciae. Colombia

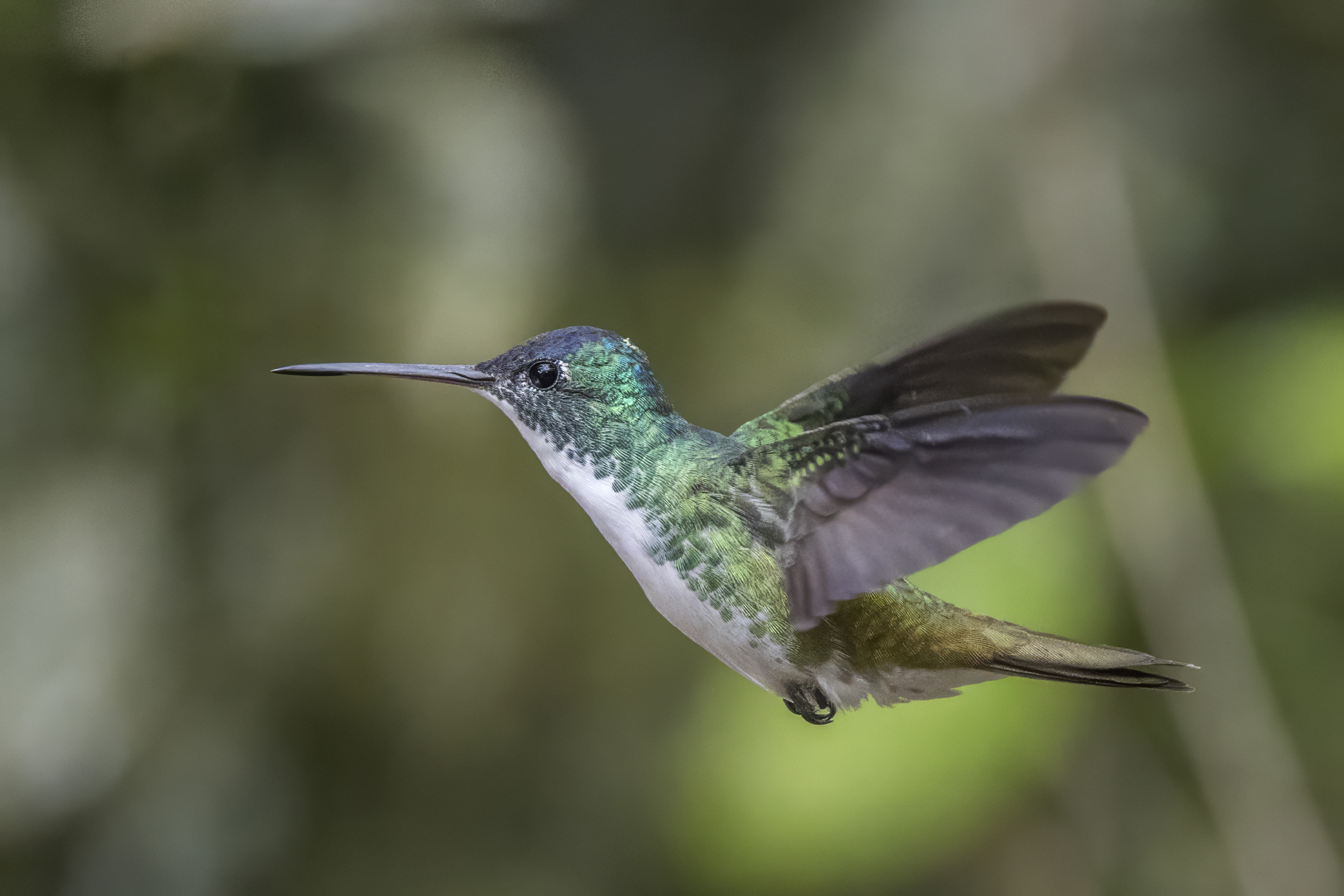
male U. f. franciae. Colombia

== Description ==
The Andean emerald is 9 to 11 cm (3.5 to 4.3 in) long. Males weigh about 5.6 g (0.20 oz) and females about 5.3 g (0.19 oz). Both sexes of all subspecies have a straight to slightly decurved bill of medium length with a blackish maxilla and a coral red mandible with a dark tip. Adult males of the nominate subspecies U. f. franciae have a glittering violet-blue crown and glittering golden- to emerald green cheeks and neck. Their upperparts and flanks are light green to golden-green with a coppery tinge to the uppertail coverts. The center of their underparts is white. Their tail is bronze-green to copperish. The adult female is similar to the male but its crown is turquoise-blue to greenish and less glittering. Juveniles are similar to the adult female and also have brownish edges on the upperparts' feathers and grayish brown flanks.

Subspecies U. f. viridiceps differs from the nominate with a shorter tail and a green crown. U. f. cyanocollis also differs slightly from the nominate; the blue of its crown extends to the nape.

== Distribution and habitat ==
The subspecies of Andean emerald are found thus:

- U. f. franciae, Andes of northwestern and central Colombia
- U. f. viridiceps, Andes from southwestern Colombia's Nariño Department through western Ecuador to Loja Province
- U. f. cyanocollis, Andes of southeastern Ecuador's Zamora-Chinchipe Province and northern Peru's Marañón River valley south and east to La Libertad Province

The Andean emerald inhabits secondary forest and the edges and clearings of wet primary forest. In Peru it also occurs in drier shrublands. In elevation it ranges between 600 and 2,100 m (2,000 and 6,900 ft) and is most common above 1,000 m (3,300 ft).

== Behavior ==
=== Movement ===
The Andean emerald makes seasonal elevational movements that however are not well defined.

=== Feeding ===
The Andean emerald forages for nectar at a variety of flowering herbs, vines, and trees, usually from the middle to upper strata of the forest. It forages by trap-lining, visiting a circuit of nectar sources. It sometimes mixes with other hummingbirds at flower patches but is subordinate to territorial species. In addition to nectar it feeds on insects by hawking from a perch.

=== Breeding ===
Andean emerald breeding activity has been documented at almost every time of year. It builds a cup nest of treefern scales and plant fibers bound with spiderweb and with lichen on the outside. It typically sites it about 1.4 to 2.3 m (5 to 8 ft) above the ground. The female incubates the clutch of two eggs for 19 to 24 days and fledging occurs about 16 to 22 days after hatch.

=== Vocalization ===
The Andean emerald has a quite variable song, typically described as "a repeated complex phrase of high-pitched squeaky whistles, trills and scratchy notes." It also makes "a high-pitched 'tsip'" call, and during social interactions "scratchy squeaky chatters".

== Status ==
The IUCN has assessed the Andean Emerald as being of Least Concern, though its population size and trend are unknown. No immeditate threats have been identified. It is considered uncommon to fairly common and is found in at least one protected area.
