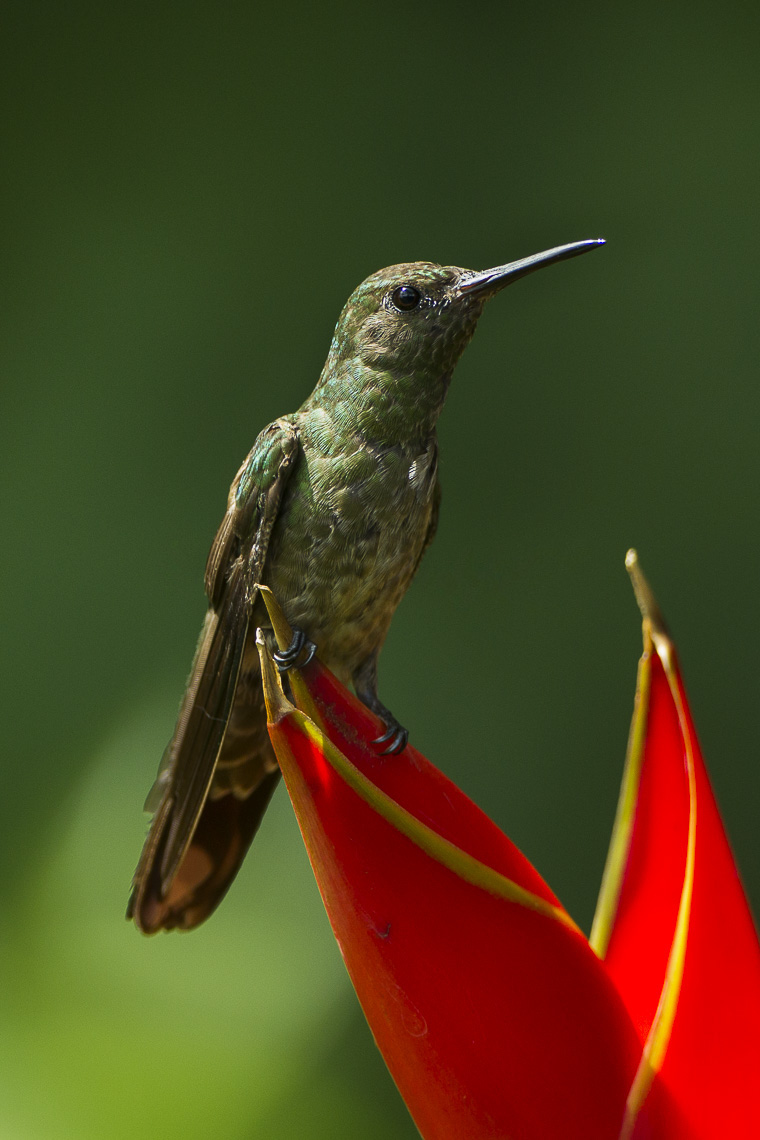

Conservation status
- Least Concern (IUCN 3.1)
- CITES Appendix II

Scientific classification
- Kingdom: Animalia
- Phylum: Chordata
- Class: Aves
- Order: Apodiformes
- Family: Trochilidae
- Tribe: Trochilini
- Genus: Phaeochroa; Gould, 1861
- Species: P. cuvierii

Binomial name
- Phaeochroa cuvierii (Delattre & Bourcier, 1846)
- Range of P. cuvierii

Synonyms
- Campylopterus cuvierii

= Scaly-breasted hummingbird =

Species of hummingbird found in Central America

The scaly-breasted hummingbird or scaly-breasted sabrewing (Phaeochroa cuvierii) is a species of hummingbird in the "emeralds", tribe Trochilini of subfamily Trochilinae. It is found in Belize, Colombia, Costa Rica, Guatemala, Honduras, Mexico, Nicaragua, and Panama.

== Taxonomy and systematics ==
Most major taxonomic systems place the scaly-breasted hummingbird by itself in genus Phaeochroa. However, BirdLife International's Handbook of the Birds of the World (HBW) places it in the large genus Campylopterus and calls it the scaly-breasted sabrewing. All but HBW follow the findings of a 2014 study that found Campylpterus to be polyphyletic and resulted in the move of several species to other genera.

The worldwide systems agree that the scaly-breasted hummingbird has these six subspecies:

- P. c. roberti (Salvin, 1861)
- P. c. maculicauda Griscom, 1932
- P. c. furvescens Wetmore, 1967
- P. c. saturatior (Hartert, 1901)
- P. c. cuvierii (Delattre & Bourcier, 1846)
- P. c. berlepschi Hellmayr, 1915

P. c. roberti has been suggested as a separate species.

== Description ==
The scaly-breasted hummingbird is 11.5 to 13 cm (4.5 to 5.1 in) long and weighs about 8 to 10 g (0.28 to 0.35 oz). All of the subspecies except P. c. roberti have a mostly black bill with a pink base to the mandible; roberti's is all black. Males and females of all subspecies have the same plumage but females have a longer bill. The nominate subspecies P. c. cuvierii is the smallest and palest subspecies. It is mostly bronzy green with a grayish buff belly. The feathers of the underparts have buffy edges that give a scaly appearance. The tail is mostly bronzy, with white tips on the outer two or three pairs of feathers.

Subspecies P. c. roberti differs from the nominate by having black outer tail feathers with white tips. P. c. maculicauda has a greener throat than the nominate's and partially black outer tail feathers. P. c. furvescens has a darker green throat and upper breast and a paler belly than the nominate. P. c. saturatior is the largest and darkest subspecies but otherwise is similar to the nominate. P. c. berlepschi has a somewhat rusty belly and more white on the tips of the tail than the nominate.

== Distribution and habitat ==
The scaly-breasted hummingbird is distributed thus:

- P. c. roberti, extreme southeastern Mexico and on the Caribbean slope through Guatemala, Belize, Honduras, and Nicaragua into northeastern Costa Rica
- P. c. maculicauda, Pacific slope of Costa Rica
- P. c. furvescens, Pacific slope of western Panama
- P. c. saturatior, Coiba Island off southwestern Panama
- P. c. cuvierii, central Panama east into Guna Yala
- P. c. berlepschi, northern Colombia's Atlántico and Bolívar departments

The scaly-breasted hummingbird inhabits a variety of semi-open to open landscapes including dry forest, edges and clearings of gallery and humid forest, mangroves, secondary forest, scrublands, and gardens. It shuns the interior of closed forest. It usually occurs from the understory to the mid-strata but also in the canopy at forest edges. It is mainly at low elevation but is found locally as high as 1,200 m (3,900 ft) in Costa Rica.

== Behavior ==
=== Movement ===
The scaly-breasted hummingbird is mostly sedentary but makes local movements to follow flowering events.

=== Feeding ===
The scaly-breasted hummingbird forages for nectar at a variety of flowering trees, shrubs, and bromeliads. If feeds on them both by hovering and, for large blooms, perching. It aggressively defends patches of flowers and is dominant over smaller hummingbirds. In addition to nectar, it feeds on arthropods caught by hawking and also by gleaning from vegetation.

=== Breeding ===
The scaly-breasted hummingbird mostly breeds during the rainy season, between May and December in Guatemala and May to January in Costa Rica. Assemblages of males display for females at leks. It builds a cup nest of plant down and spiderweb with much moss and lichen on the outside. It typically places it in a small tree as a saddle on a horizontal branch 2 to 8 m (7 to 30 ft) above the ground. The female incubates the clutch of two eggs for 17 to 19 days and fledging occurs 22 to 29 days after hatch.

=== Vocalization ===
The scaly-breasted hummingbird's song is "a loud, variable, continuous warble...a mix of chips, sharp squeaks and short trills or sputters". During chases it makes "a high-pitched descending trill" and other calls include "a repeated short burry 'trrk', [a] wet 'tlek', and a more emphatic 'chick'."

== Status ==
The IUCN has assessed the scaly-breasted hummingbird as being of Least Concern. It has a very large range and its estimated population of at least 50,000 mature individuals is believed to be stable. No immediate threats have been identified. It is considered uncommon to locally common, and occurs in several protected areas.
