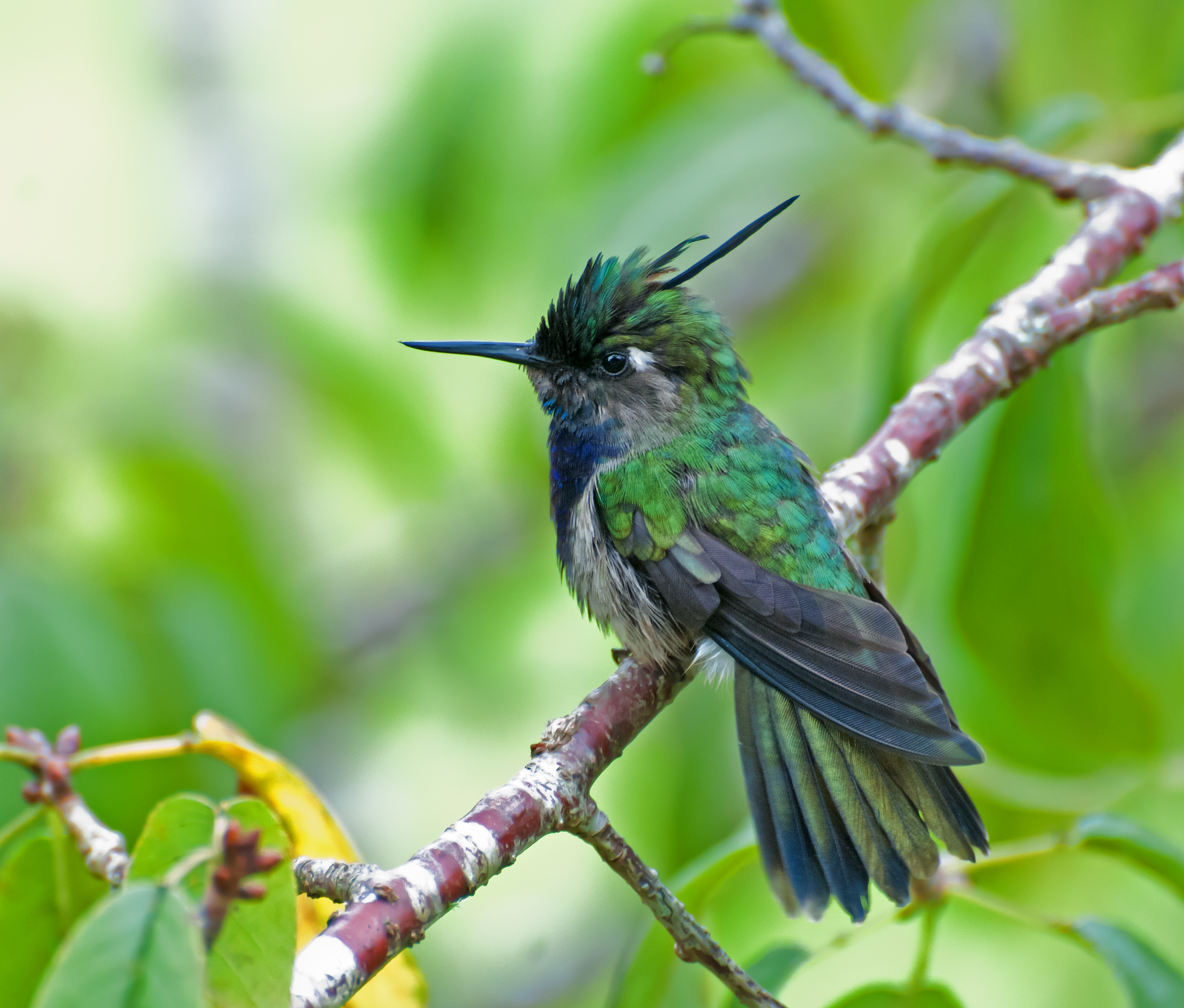
- Green-crowned plovercrest (Stephanoxis lalandi)

Scientific classification
- Kingdom: Animalia
- Phylum: Chordata
- Class: Aves
- Order: Apodiformes
- Family: Trochilidae
- Tribe: Trochilini
- Genus: Stephanoxis; Simon, 1897

Type species
- Trochilus lalandi Vieillot, 1818

Species
- S. lalandi S. loddigesii

= Plovercrest =

Genus of birds

The two plovercrests comprise the genus Stephanoxis. They were formerly considered conspecific under the name "black-breasted plovercrest".

== Species ==
The SACC accepted both as distinct species in 2015. The two species are:

Genus Stephanoxis – Simon, 1897 – two species
Common name	Scientific name and subspecies	Range	Size and ecology	IUCN status and estimated population
Green-crowned plovercrest	Stephanoxis lalandi (Vieillot, 1818)	Brazil	Size: Habitat: Diet:	LC
Purple-crowned plovercrest	Stephanoxis loddigesii (Vigors, 1831)	Argentina, Brazil, and Paraguay	Size: Habitat: Diet:	LC
