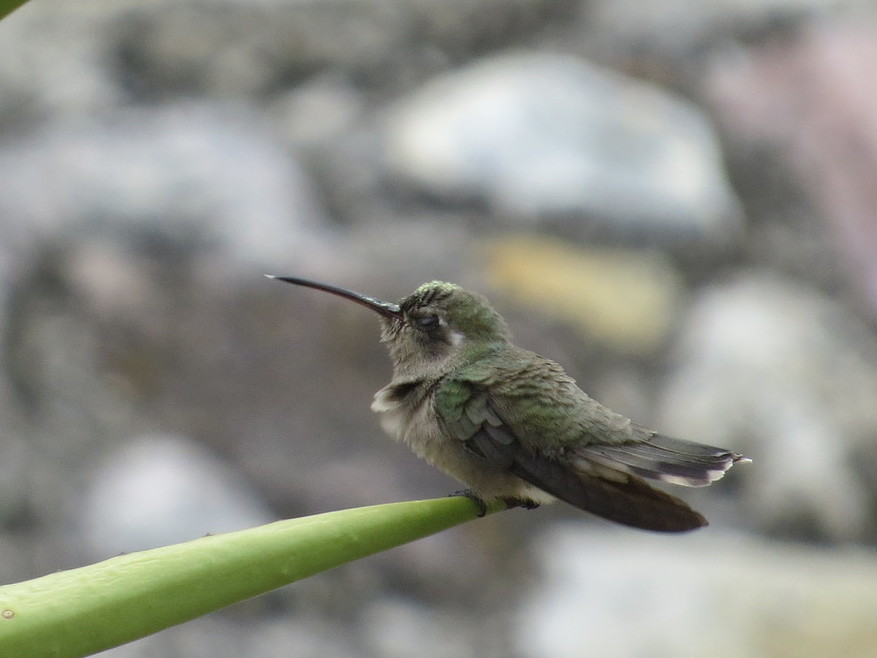

Conservation status
- Least Concern (IUCN 3.1)
- CITES Appendix II

Scientific classification
- Kingdom: Animalia
- Phylum: Chordata
- Class: Aves
- Order: Apodiformes
- Family: Trochilidae
- Tribe: Trochilini
- Genus: Phaeoptila; Gould, 1861
- Species: P. sordida

Binomial name
- Phaeoptila sordida (Gould, 1859)

Synonyms
- Cyanomyia sordida (Gould); Cynanthus sordidus

= Dusky hummingbird =

Species of hummingbird

The dusky hummingbird (Phaeoptila sordida) is a species of hummingbird in the "emeralds", tribe Trochilini of subfamily Trochilinae. It is endemic to Mexico.

== Taxonomy and systematics ==
The dusky hummingbird was formerly placed in the genus Cynanthus. Based on a molecular phylogenetic study published in 2014 and a 2017 publication, the North American Classification Committee of the American Ornithological Society, the International Ornithological Committee (IOC), and the Clements taxonomy moved it to the resurrected genus Phaeoptila that had been introduced in 1861 by John Gould. However, as of 2020, BirdLife International's Handbook of the Birds of the World (HBW) retained it in Cynanthus.

The dusky hummingbird is the only species in genus Phaeoptila and has no subspecies.

== Description ==
The dusky hummingbird is 9 to 10.6 cm (3.5 to 4.2 in) long. Males weigh about 4.3 g (0.15 oz) and females about 3.4 g (0.12 oz). Males have a bright red bill with a black tip. Their upperparts are bronze green to greenish bronze that is more brownish or grayish on the crown and uppertail coverts. The tail is dull greenish bronze or grayish brown with a greenish gloss and dusky feather bases. It has a grayish streak behind the eye and dusky cheeks. It does not have an iridescent gorget like most other hummingbirds, but a deep gray throat with greenish flecks. Its underparts are slightly lighter gray down to the undertail coverts, which are buffy. It has white leg tufts. The female is much like the male. However, its bill is a duller red with a dark tip, its outer tail feathers have a blackish blue band near the end and brownish-gray tips, and its underparts are a paler gray.

== Distribution and habitat ==
The dusky hummingbird is found in southwestern Mexico from Michoacán and Morelos to Oaxaca. It inhabits arid scrub and other semi-open to open landscapes with some trees. In elevation it ranges between 900 and 2,200 m (3,000 and 7,200 ft).

== Behavior ==
=== Movement ===
The movement patterns of the dusky hummingbird, if any, have not been described.

=== Feeding ===
The dusky hummingbird forages for nectar in the mid- to upper levels of trees. It also feeds on the flowers of a variety of columnar cacti and agave. It spreads and wags its tail while feeding. In addition to nectar it also feeds on small arthropods.

=== Breeding ===
Dusky hummingbirds have been observed breeding in March, May, August, November, and December. The nest is a small cup of plant fibers lined with soft plant down and covered with leaf and bark bits. Three were noted between 1.2 and 2 m (4 and 7 ft) above the ground in shrubs. The incubation period and time to fledging are not known.

=== Vocalization ===
What is thought to be the dusky hummingbird's song is "a quiet, dry, chippering warble". It makes "dry, slightly buzzy chips" and a chattering call that is described as similar to that of the broad-billed hummingbird (Cynanthus latirostris) but "softer and more liquid or spluttering".

== Status ==
The IUCN has assessed the dusky hummingbird as being of Least Concern. It has a fairly large range and a population of at least 50,000 mature individuals that is believed to be stable. No specific threats have been identified.
