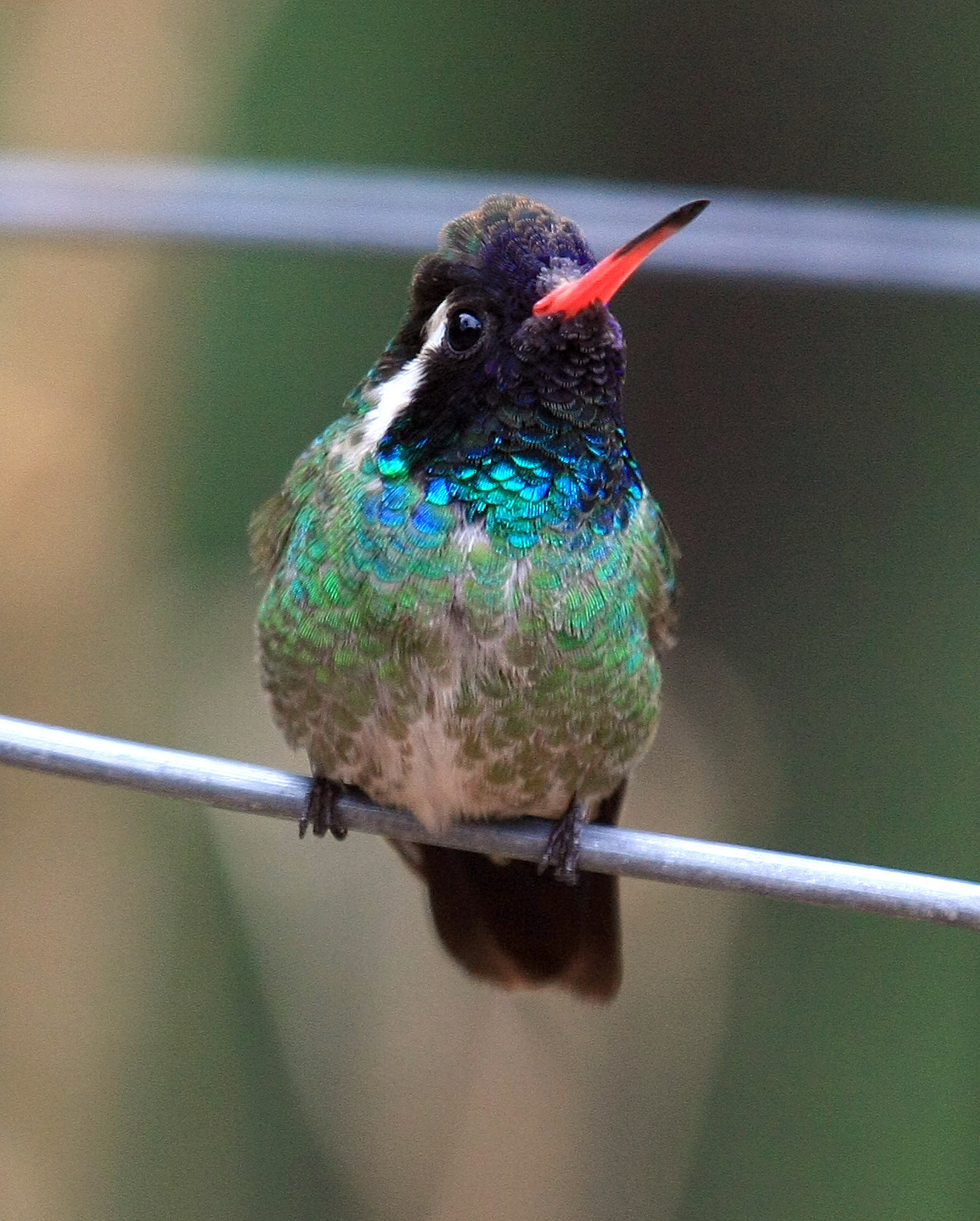
- White-eared hummingbird, Basilinna leucotis

Scientific classification
- Kingdom: Animalia
- Phylum: Chordata
- Class: Aves
- Order: Apodiformes
- Family: Trochilidae
- Tribe: Trochilini
- Genus: Basilinna; F. Boie, 1831

Species
- 2, see text

= Basilinna (bird) =

Genus of birds

Basilinna is a genus of hummingbird in the family Trochilidae.

== Species ==
The genus contains only two species:

Genus Basilinna – F. Boie, 1831 – two species
Common name	Scientific name and subspecies	Range	Size and ecology	IUCN status and estimated population
White-eared hummingbird	Basilinna leucotis (Vieillot, 1818) Three subspecies: B. l. leucotis; B. l. borealis; B. l. pygmaea	southeastern Arizona, southern New Mexico, and western Texas through the Sierra Madre Occidental and Sierra Madre Oriental of northern Mexico and the Cordillera Neovolcanica of southern Mexico to southern Nicaragua	Size: Habitat: Diet:	LC
Xantus's hummingbird	Basilinna xantusii (Lawrence, 1860)	southern Baja Peninsula of Mexico	Size: Habitat: Diet:	LC
