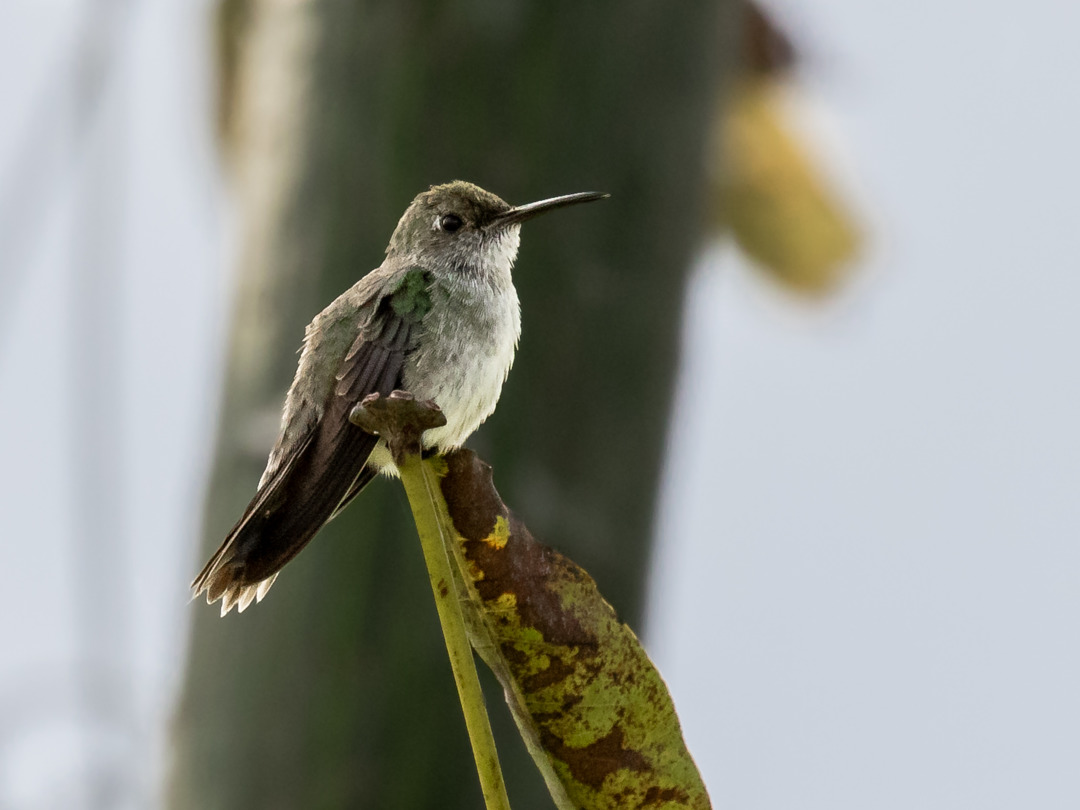

Conservation status
- Least Concern (IUCN 3.1)
- CITES Appendix II

Scientific classification
- Kingdom: Animalia
- Phylum: Chordata
- Class: Aves
- Order: Apodiformes
- Family: Trochilidae
- Genus: Talaphorus; Mulsant & Verreaux, 1874
- Species: T. chlorocercus

Binomial name
- Talaphorus chlorocercus (Gould, 1866)

Synonyms
- Leucippus chlorocercus

= Olive-spotted hummingbird =

The olive-spotted hummingbird (Talaphorus chlorocercus) is a species of hummingbird in the "emeralds", tribe Trochilini of the subfamily Trochilinae. It is found in Brazil, Colombia, Ecuador, and Peru.

== Taxonomy and systematics ==
The olive-spotted hummingbird was previously placed in the genus Leucippus. A molecular phylogenetic study published in 2014 found that Leucippus was polyphyletic. To avoid the polyphyly the olive-spotted hummingbird was moved by most taxonomic systems to the resurrected genus Talaphorus. However, BirdLife International's Handbook of the Birds of the World retains it in Leucippus.

The olive-spotted hummingbird is the only member of its genus and has no subspecies.

== Description ==
The olive-spotted hummingbird is 12 cm (4.7 in) long and weighs about 6 g (0.21 oz). The sexes are essentially the same. They have a straight blackish bill; the females are slightly longer than the males. Adults have a bronze crown and neck and the rest of their upper parts are grayish-green to bronze-green. Their throat is olive green which sometimes appears speckled with golden green and the rest of the underparts are whitish. Their tail is pale grayish green to olive green with grayish tips on the inner feathers and grayish outer webs to the others. The outer feathers also have a dark bar near the end. Juveniles are very similar but have more grayish brown underparts.

== Distribution and habitat ==
The olive-spotted hummingbird is found along the upper Amazon River and its major tributaries in northwestern Brazil, eastern Ecuador, northeastern Peru, and extreme southeastern Colombia. It has habitat requirements unique among hummingbirds: It is found almost entirely on young river islands and sometimes on the adjacent "mainland" shore. It keeps to shrubby open woodland and early successional vegetation. In elevation it occurs only up to 400 m (1,300 ft).

== Behavior ==
=== Movement ===
The olive-spotted hummingbird is generally sedentary but makes some local dispersal.

=== Feeding ===
The olive-spotted hummingbird forages for nectar at flowering plants of at least 10 families. In addition to feeding on nectar it gleans insects from foliage.

=== Breeding ===
The olive-spotted hummingbird's breeding season is not known. It makes a cup nest of soft plant material and fibers bound with spiderwebs with lichen on the outside. The female incubates the clutch of two eggs for 14 to 15 days and fledging occurs about 20 days after hatch.

=== Vocalization ===
The olive-spotted hummingbird's song is "a monotonous series of multisyllabic notes, e.g. 'cliCHEW cliCHEW cliCHEW...'" and its calls include "a sharp 'seek', a wiry 'seeuee', a rich chatter and a hard 'tcht'."

== Status ==
The IUCN has assessed the olive-spotted hummingbird as being of Least Concern, though its population size and trend are unknown. No immediate threats have been identified. It is considered rare to fairly common at different points along the river system.
