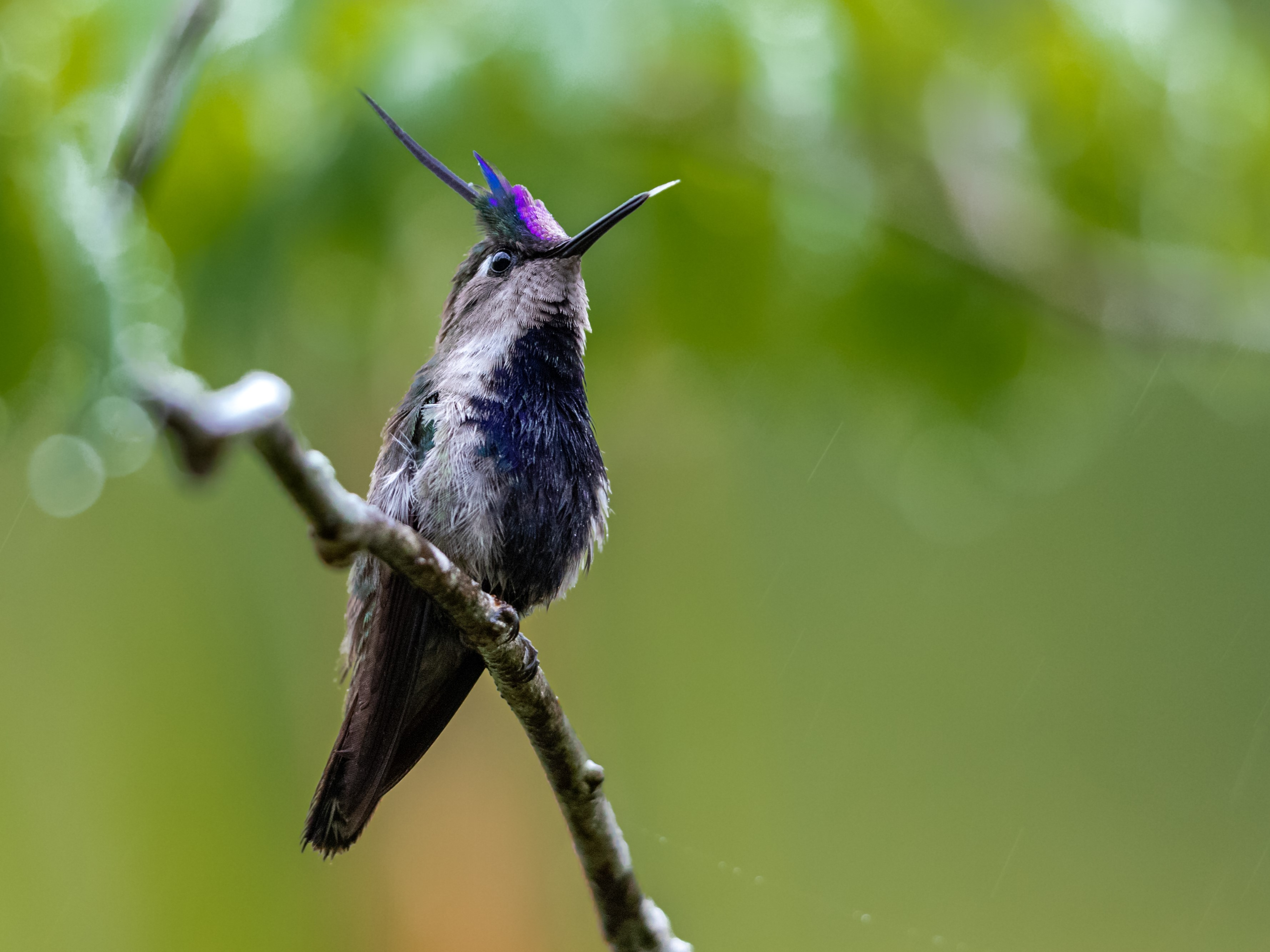
- male

Conservation status
- Least Concern (IUCN 3.1)
- CITES Appendix II

Scientific classification
- Kingdom: Animalia
- Phylum: Chordata
- Class: Aves
- Order: Apodiformes
- Family: Trochilidae
- Genus: Stephanoxis
- Species: S. loddigesii

Binomial name
- Stephanoxis loddigesii (Vigors, 1831)

Synonyms
- Stephanoxis lalandi loddigesii

= Purple-crowned plovercrest =

Species of hummingbird

The purple-crowned plovercrest, or violet-crowned plovercrest, (Stephanoxis loddigesii) is a species of hummingbird in the "emeralds", tribe Trochilini of subfamily Trochilinae. It is found in Argentina, Brazil, and Paraguay.

== Taxonomy and systematics ==
The purple-crowned plovercrest and green-crowned plovercrest (Stephanoxis lalandi) were originally treated as separate species but in the mid-1900s were combined under the name "plovercrest" with the binomial S. lalandi. A study published in 2014 provided evidence that the original two-species treatment was correct. Taxonomists worldwide agreed and the two taxa were restored to species status. They are the only members of the genus and are monotypic.

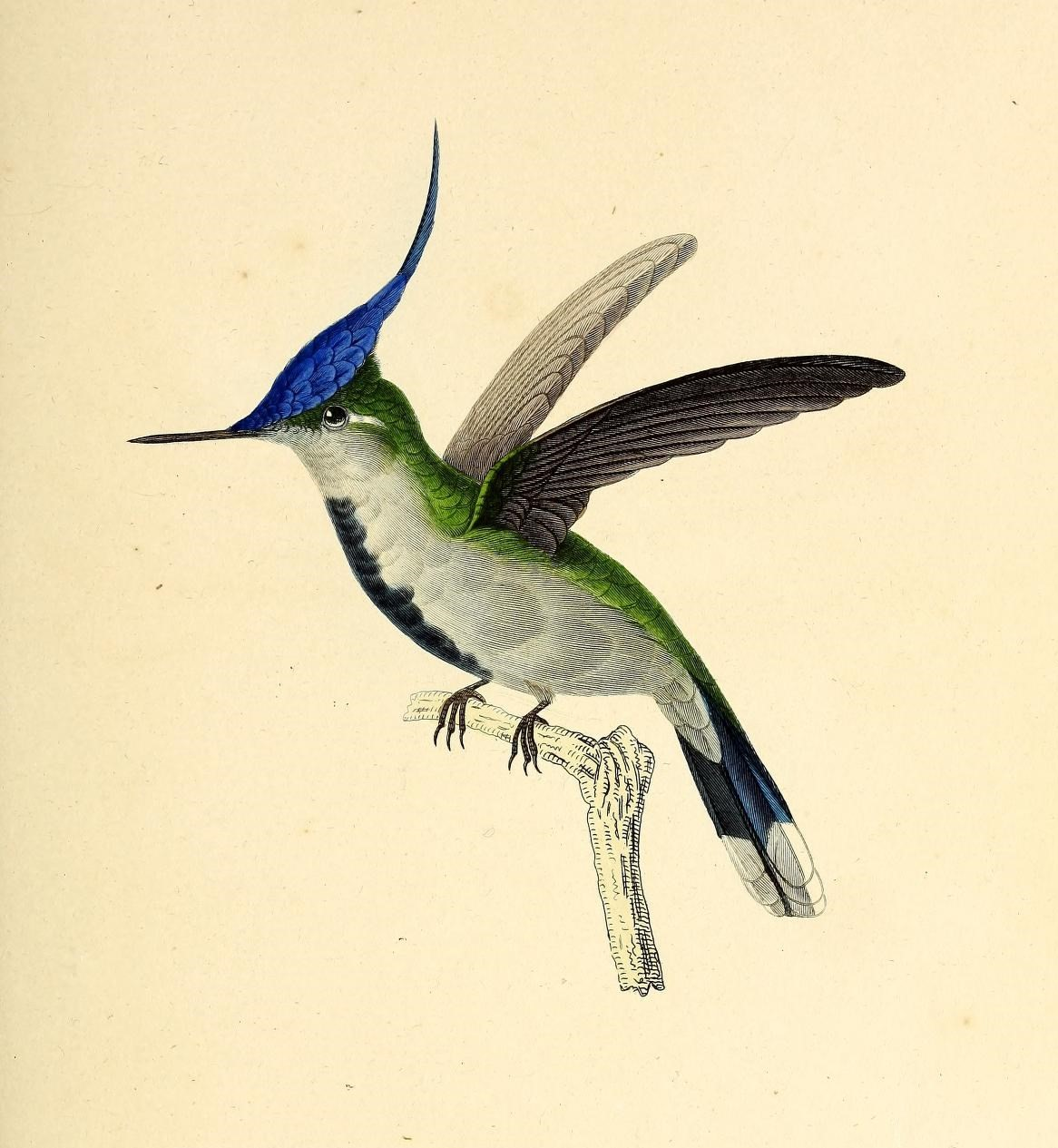
Stephanoxis loddigesii by A. Bertrand

== Description ==
The purple-crowned plovercrest is 8.5 to 9.5 cm (3.3 to 3.7 in) long. Males weigh about 3.7 g (0.13 oz). Both sexes have a shortish, straight, black bill. Adult males have a shaggy violet-blue crest. Their face, chin, and throat are brownish with a white spot behind the eye. Their upperparts yellowish green. Their lower throat to upper belly is blackish violet-blue and the rest of the underparts are gray. Their central two pairs of tail feathers are green and the rest green with a blackish band near the end and whitish tips. Adult females and juveniles have a much smaller crest. Their upperparts are also yellowish green and their underparts gray.

== Distribution and habitat ==
The purple-crowned plovercrest is found in eastern Paraguay, far northeastern Argentina, and southern Brazil as far north as southern São Paulo state. It inhabits the understory of forest, scrublands, and vegetation along watercourses. In elevation it ranges between sea level and about 900 m (3,000 ft).

== Behavior ==
=== Movement ===
The purple-crowned plovercrest is mostly sedentary but in the southernmost part of its range some individuals move to lower elevations in winter.

=== Feeding ===
The purple-crowned plovercrest forages for nectar from near the ground to the canopy, utilizing both native and introduced flowering species. Males defend feeding territories during the breeding season. In addition to nectar, the species feeds on insects caught in flight or gleaned from leaves.

=== Breeding ===
The purple-crowned plovercrest's breeding season spans from October to March in Brazil. Males usually gather at leks to court females, but single birds also display. Females make a cup nest of soft plant and seed fibers bound with spiderweb and with lichens on the outside. It is typically placed on a forked branch in vegetation at about 1 to 3 m (3 to 10 ft) above the ground. Females incubate the clutch of two eggs for 14 to 16 days; the time to fledging has not been documented.

=== Vocalization ===
Males sing "a complex, modulated vocalization" at leks and when chasing other plovercrests.

== Status ==
The IUCN has assessed the purple-crowned plovercrest as being of Least Concern, though its population size and trend are unknown. No immediate threats have been identified. It is considered patchily distributed and locally common in parts of its range and uncommon to rare in Paraguay. It occurs in several national parks and private reserves, and "[r]eadily accepts man-modified habitats such as farmland" as long as patches of scrub or forest remain.
