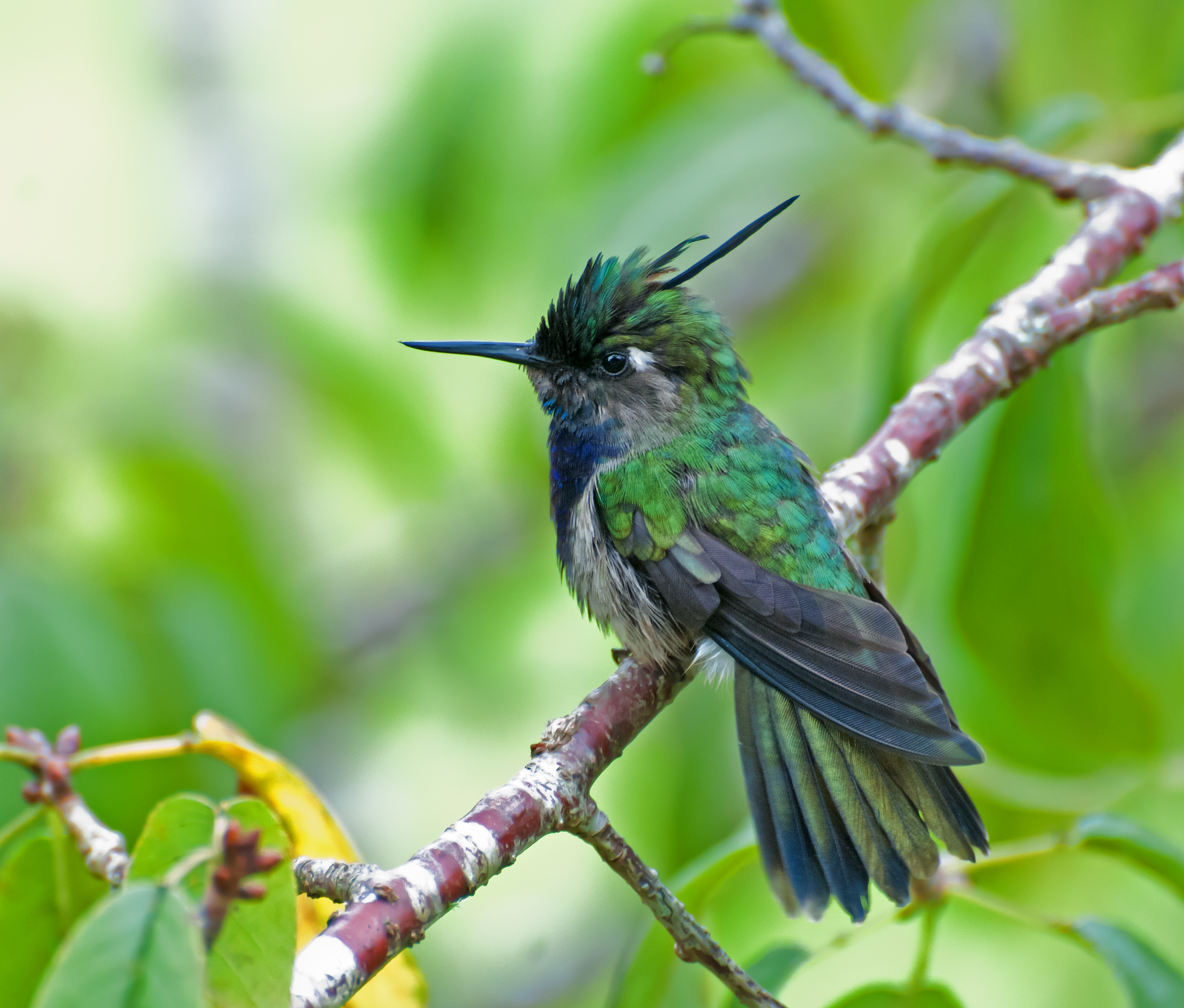
- In São Paulo, Brazil

Conservation status
- Least Concern (IUCN 3.1)
- CITES Appendix II (CITES)

Scientific classification
- Kingdom: Animalia
- Phylum: Chordata
- Class: Aves
- Clade: Strisores
- Order: Apodiformes
- Family: Trochilidae
- Genus: Stephanoxis
- Species: S. lalandi

Binomial name
- Stephanoxis lalandi (Vieillot, 1818)

Synonyms
- Plovercrest

= Green-crowned plovercrest =

Species of hummingbird

The green-crowned plovercrest, also black-breasted plovercrest or simply plovercrest, (Stephanoxis lalandi) is a species of hummingbird in the "emeralds", tribe Trochilini of subfamily Trochilinae. It is endemic to Brazil.

== Taxonomy and systematics ==
The green-crowned plovercrest and purple-crowned plovercrest (Stephanoxis loddigesii) were originally treated as separate species but in the mid-1900s were combined under the name "plovercrest" with the binomial S. lalandi. A study published in 2014 provided evidence that the original two-species treatment was correct. Taxonomists worldwide agreed and the two taxa were restored to species status. They are the only members of the genus and are monotypic.

== Description ==
The green-crowned plovercrest is 8.5 to 9 cm (3.3 to 3.5 in) long. Males weigh 3 to 3.4 g (0.11 to 0.12 oz) and females about 2.2 g (0.078 oz). Both sexes have a short, straight, black bill. Adult males have a shaggy, mostly iridescent green, crest whose longest feather is purplish black. Their face is gray with a white spot behind the eye. Their upperparts are shining bronze-green. Their chin to upper belly is violet-blue and the rest of the underparts are gray. Their central tail feathers are green and the rest green with a blackish band near the end and grayish white tips. Adult females and juveniles have a smaller crest. Their upperparts are shining green and their underparts gray.

== Distribution and habitat ==
The green-crowned plovercrest is found in the eastern Brazilian states of Minas Gerais, Espírito Santo, São Paulo, and Rio de Janeiro. It inhabits the understory of forest, scrublands, and vegetation along watercourses. In elevation it mostly ranges between sea level and about 1,500 m (4,900 ft) but has been found as high as 2,900 m (9,500 ft).

== Behavior ==
=== Movement ===
The green-crowned plovercrest is mostly sedentary, though it might make some seasonal movements.

=== Feeding ===
The green-crowned plovercrest forages for nectar from near the ground to the canopy, utilizing both native and introduced flowering species. Males defend feeding territories during the breeding season. In addition to nectar, the species feeds on insects caught in flight or gleaned from leaves.

=== Breeding ===
The green-crowned plovercrest's breeding season spans from October to March. Males usually gather at leks to court females, but single birds also display. Females make a cup nest of soft plant and seed fibers bound with spiderweb. It is typically placed on a forked branch in vegetation at about 1 to 3 m (3 to 10 ft) above the ground. Females incubate the clutch of two eggs for 14 to 16 days and fledging occurs 24 to 28 days after hatch.

=== Vocalization ===
The male green-crowned plovercrest's song is "a long series of a repeated modulated note, 'tsi-ling...tsi-ling...tsi-ling...'", which typically starts with "a high-pitched 'tsee'."

== Status ==
The IUCN has assessed the green-crowned plovercrest as being of Least Concern, though its population size and trend are unknown. No immediate threats have been identified. It is considered patchily distributed and locally common. It occurs in three national parks and " [r]eadily takes to man-made habitats such as farmland" as long as patches of scrub or forest remain.
