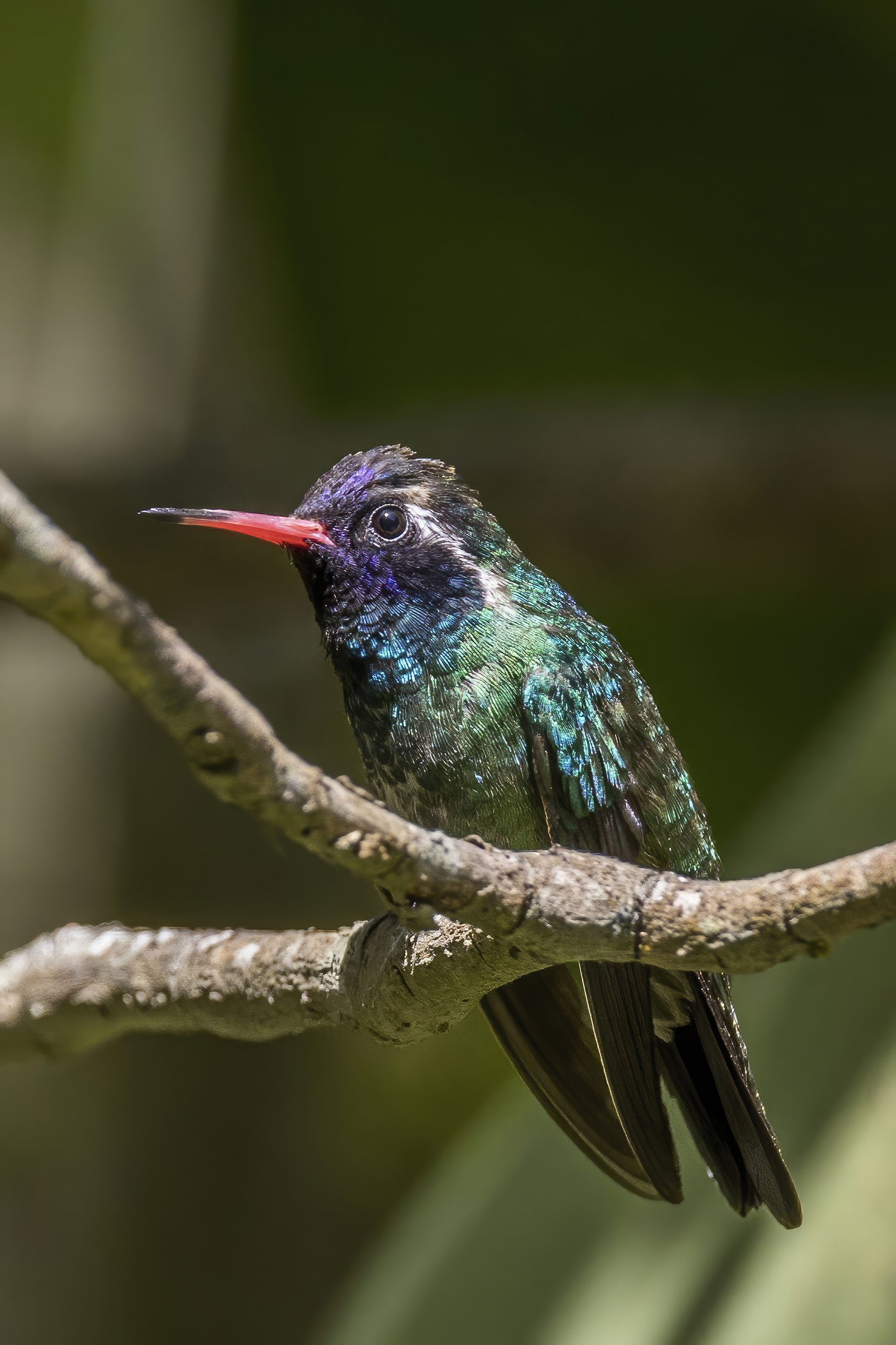
- In Guatemala
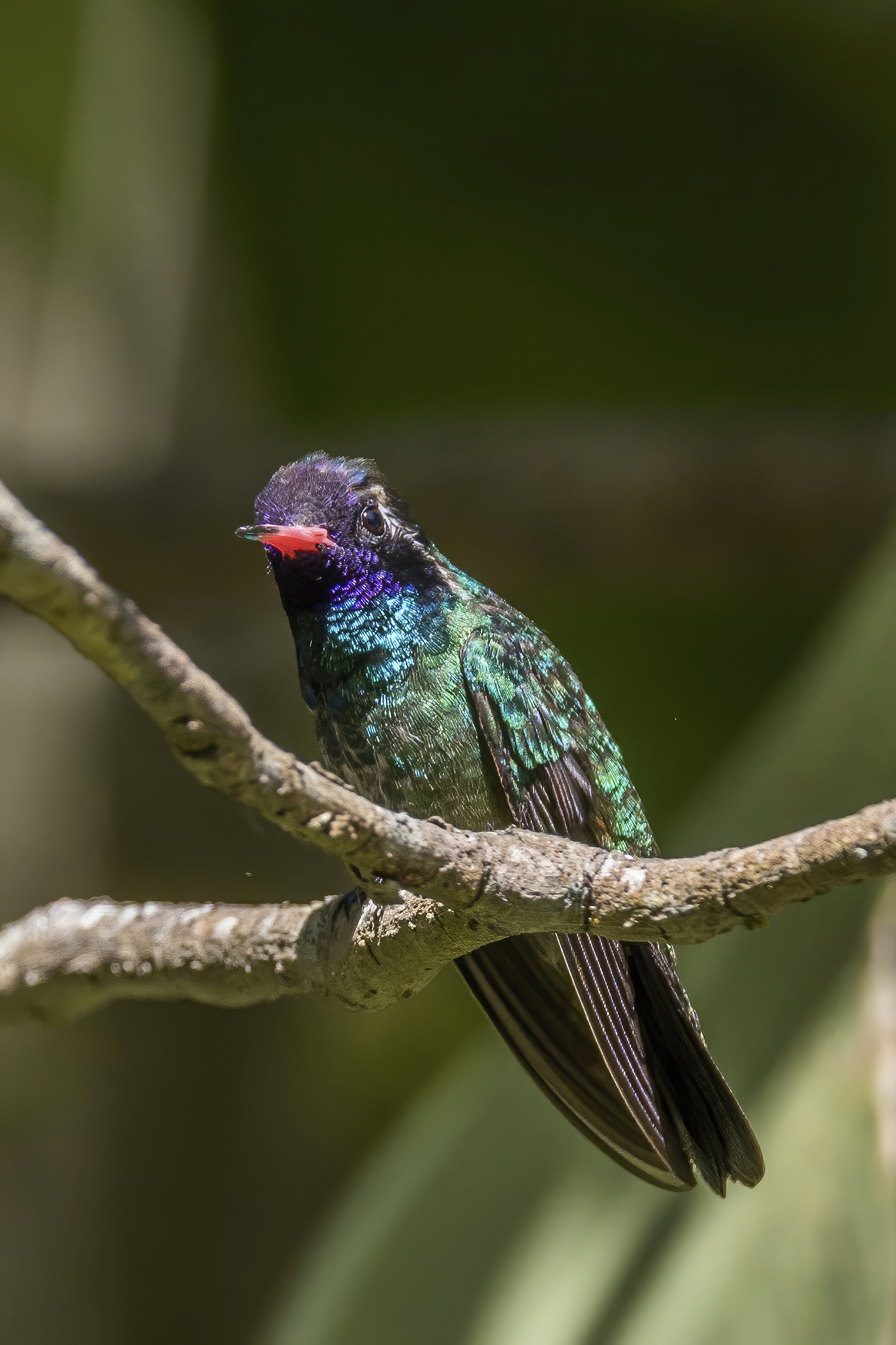
- Showing chest and head feathers

Conservation status
- Least Concern (IUCN 3.1)
- CITES Appendix II (CITES)

Scientific classification
- Kingdom: Animalia
- Phylum: Chordata
- Class: Aves
- Clade: Strisores
- Order: Apodiformes
- Family: Trochilidae
- Genus: Basilinna
- Species: B. leucotis

Binomial name
- Basilinna leucotis (Vieillot, 1818)

Synonyms
- Hylocharis leucotis

= White-eared hummingbird =

Species of hummingbird

The white-eared hummingbird (Basilinna leucotis) is a species of hummingbird in the "emeralds", tribe Trochilini of subfamily Trochilinae. It is found from the southwestern U.S. to Nicaragua.

== Taxonomy and systematics ==
The white-eared hummingbird was originally placed in genus Trochilus and then moved to Hylocharis. A study published in 2014 determined that both were in error and it was moved to Basilinna. The species has three subspecies, the nominate B. l. leucotis, B. l. borealis, and B. l. pygmaea.

== Description ==
The white-eared hummingbird is 9 to 10 cm (3.5 to 3.9 in) long. Males weigh an average of 3.6 g (0.13 oz) and females 3.2 g (0.11 oz). Adults of the three subspecies are very similar. Their bills are straight; males' are red with a black tip and females' are mostly blackish with some red to orange at the base.

Males of the nominate subspecies in breeding plumage have a metallic violet or bluish violet forehead, a mostly black face with a wide white stripe behind the eye, and a dull black crown. Their upperparts are bright metallic green to bronze green and the uppertail coverts more bronzy; the rump and covert feathers have rusty edges. The central pair of tail feathers are bright bronze green, the next pair a darker green, and the remaining three pairs bronzy black with bright bronze green tips. Their chin and upper throat are violet blue, the lower throat metallic emerald green, and the breast and flanks are bronze to bronze green with dull grayish white down the center. The undertail coverts are grayish brown with a faint bronze gloss.

Nominate females in breeding plumage resemble the males. However, their crown is dusky brown and they lack the brilliant chin and throat of the male. Their underparts are pale brownish gray to grayish white with metallic bronze green spots and the undertail coverts are grayish with whitish margins. Their central tail feathers have brownish gray tips.

Subspecies B. l. borealis is somewhat larger than the nominate. The male's underparts have much more white and less green. B. l. pygmaea is somewhat smaller than the nominate with less green on the lower throat and more white on the underparts.

== Distribution and habitat ==
The white-eared hummingbird's B. l. borealis subspecies occurs from southern Arizona into the Mexican states of Sonora, Chihuahua, and Tamaulipas. It is an occasional visitor to New Mexico and Texas and has occurred as a vagrant further north and east in the U.S. The nominate subspecies B. l. leucotis is found from central and southern Mexico into Guatemala. B. l. pygmaea is found in El Salvador, Honduras, and Nicaragua. The white-eared hummingbird is a species of montane regions where it inhabits the interior, clearings, and edges of pine, pine-oak, and pine-evergreen forest. In elevation it ranges between 1,200 and 3,500 m (3,900 and 11,500 ft).

== Behavior ==
=== Movement ===
In most of its range the white-eared hummingbird is a year-round resident. It withdraws south from the U.S. and far northern Mexico after the breeding season, and the southernmost populations might make seasonal elevational movements.

=== Feeding ===
The white-eared hummingbird forages for nectar at a very wide variety of flowering plants and shrubs, mainly feeding in the low to mid-levels of the vegetation. It defends feeding territories from others of its species, smaller species, and even somewhat larger species such as the broad-tailed hummingbird (Selasphorus platycercus). It also makes "secretive low approaches" to feed in the territories of significantly larger species like Rivoli's hummingbird (Eugenes fulgens). In addition to nectar, it also feeds on small insects.

=== Breeding ===
The white-eared hummingbird's breeding seasons vary with latitude, from March to August in the north to October through December in El Salvador. Males court in leks where they sing and display for females. The nest is a cup made of plant down with lichens on the outside. It is typically placed up to 6 m (20 ft) above the ground in a tree or shrub, and several nests may be short distances apart. The female incubates the clutch of two eggs for 14 to 16 days and fledging occurs 23 to 28 days after hatch. The species occasionally raises two broods in a season.

=== Vocalization ===
The white-eared hummingbird's song is "a tedious, metallic chipping chi'tink chi'tink chi'tink ..., or chi'dit chi'dit chi'dit ..., or simply tink tink." Its calls have been described as "fairly hard, dry chips, at times repeated steadily, [that] may break into short, quiet gurgles" and "a sharp metallic tchik or tink".

== Status ==
The IUCN has assessed the white-eared hummingbird as being of Least Concern. It has a very large range but its population size and trend are not known. No immediate threats have been identified. It is considered fairly common to common in most of its range. Because it uses forest edges, "it is less vulnerable [to habitat fragmentation] than are many other species of montane forests."
