= List of hummingbirds of North America =

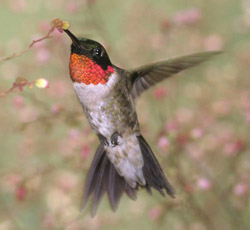
Ruby-throated hummingbird

Order: Apodiformes Family: Trochilidae

Hummingbirds are small birds capable of hovering in mid-air due to the rapid flapping of their wings. They are the only birds that can fly backwards.

Unless otherwise noted, all species listed below are considered to occur regularly in North America as permanent residents, summer or winter residents or visitors, or migrants. The following codes are used to designate some species:

- (A) Accidental - occurrence based on one or two (rarely more) records, and unlikely to occur regularly
- (C) Casual - occurrence based on two or a few records, with subsequent records not improbable
- (E) Extinct - a recent species that no longer exists
- (Ex) Extirpated - a species which no longer occurs in North America, but populations still exist elsewhere
- (I) Introduced - a population established solely as result of direct or indirect human intervention; synonymous with non-native and non-indigenous

Conservation status - IUCN Red List of Threatened Species:

EX - Extinct, EW - Extinct in the wild
CR - Critically endangered, EN - Endangered, VU - Vulnerable
NT - Near threatened, LC - Least concern
DD - Data deficient, NE - Not evaluated
(v. 2013.2, the data is current as of March 5, 2014)

and Endangered Species Act:

E - endangered, T - threatened
XN, XE - experimental non essential or essential population
E(S/A), T(S/A) - endangered or threatened due to similarity of appearance
(including taxa not necessarily found in the United States, the data is current as of June 8, 2012.)

== List of hummingbirds known to occur in North America ==
- Bronzy hermit, Glaucis aeneus LC
- Rufous-breasted hermit, Glaucis hirsutus LC
- Band-tailed barbthroat, Threnetes ruckeri LC
- Green hermit, Phaethornis guy LC
- Little hermit, Phaethornis longuemareus LC
- Long-billed hermit, Phaethornis longirostris LC
- Mexican hermit, Phaethornis mexicanus (NR)
- Pale-bellied hermit, Phaethornis anthophilus LC
- White-whiskered hermit, Phaethornis yaruqui (A) LC
- Stripe-throated hermit, Phaethornis striigularis LC
- White-tipped sicklebill, Eutoxeres aquila LC
- Tooth-billed hummingbird, Androdon aequatorialis LC
- Green-fronted lancebill, Doryfera ludovicae LC
- Scaly-breasted hummingbird, Phaeochroa cuvierii LC
- Wedge-tailed sabrewing, Campylopterus curvipennis LC
- Long-tailed sabrewing, Campylopterus excellens NT
- Rufous sabrewing, Campylopterus rufus LC
- Violet sabrewing, Campylopterus hemileucurus LC
- White-tailed sabrewing, Campylopterus ensipennis NT
- White-necked jacobin, Florisuga mellivora LC
- Brown violetear, Colibri delphinae LC
- Mexican violetear, Colibri thalassinus LC
- Lesser violetear, Colibri cyanotus
- Green-breasted mango, Anthracothorax prevostii LC
- Green-throated mango, Anthracothorax viridigula LC
- Black-throated mango, Anthracothorax nigricollis LC
- Veraguan mango, Anthracothorax veraguensis LC
- Hispaniolan mango, Anthracothorax dominicus LC
- Puerto Rican mango, Anthracothorax aurulentus LC
- Green mango, Anthracothorax viridis LC
- Jamaican mango, Anthracothorax mango LC
- Purple-throated carib, Eulampis jugularis LC
- Green-throated carib, Eulampis holosericeus LC
- Ruby-topaz hummingbird, Chrysolampis mosquitus LC
- Antillean crested hummingbird, Orthorhyncus cristatus LC
- Violet-headed hummingbird, Klais guimeti LC
- Emerald-chinned hummingbird, Abeillia abeillei LC
- Short-crested coquette, Lophornis brachylophus CR
- Rufous-crested coquette, Lophornis delattrei LC
- Black-crested coquette, Lophornis helenae LC
- White-crested coquette, Lophornis adorabilis LC
- Tufted coquette, Lophornis ornatus LC
- Green thorntail, Discosura conversii LC
- Golden-crowned emerald, Chlorostilbon auriceps LC
- Cozumel emerald, Chlorostilbon forficatus LC
- Canivet's emerald, Chlorostilbon canivetii LC
- Garden emerald, Chlorostilbon assimilis LC
- Cuban emerald, Chlorostilbon ricordii LC
- Brace's emerald, Chlorostilbon bracei (E) EX
- Hispaniolan emerald, Chlorostilbon swainsonii LC
- Puerto Rican emerald, Chlorostilbon maugaeus LC
- Blue-tailed emerald, Chlorostilbon mellisugus LC
- Green-tailed emerald, Chlorostilbon alice LC
- Blue-chinned sapphire, Chlorestes notatus LC
- Golden-tailed sapphire, Chrysuronia oenone LC
- White-tailed goldenthroat, Polytmus guainumbi LC
- Dusky hummingbird, Cynanthus sordidus LC
- Broad-billed hummingbird, Cynanthus latirostris LC
- Blue-headed hummingbird, Cyanophaia bicolor LC
- Mexican woodnymph, Thalurania ridgwayi VU
- Crowned woodnymph, Thalurania colombica LC
  - Violet-crowned woodnymph, Thalurania colombica colombica
  - Green-crowned woodnymph, Thalurania colombica fannyi
- Fork-tailed woodnymph, Thalurania furcata LC
- Fiery-throated hummingbird, Panterpe insignis LC
- Violet-bellied hummingbird, Damophila julie LC
- Sapphire-throated hummingbird, Lepidopyga coeruleogularis LC
- Humboldt's sapphire, Hylocharis humboldtii LC
- Blue-throated goldentail, Hylocharis eliciae LC
- White-eared hummingbird, Hylocharis leucotis LC
- Xantus's hummingbird, Hylocharis xantusii LC
- Violet-capped hummingbird, Goldmania violiceps LC
- Pirre hummingbird, Goethalsia bella NT
- Streamertail, Trochilus polytmus LC
- Buffy hummingbird, Leucippus fallax LC
- Glittering-throated emerald, Amazilia fimbriata (A) LC
- White-chested emerald, Amazilia brevirostris LC
- White-bellied emerald, Amazilia candida LC
- Honduran emerald, Amazilia luciae EN
- Blue-chested hummingbird, Amazilia amabilis LC
- Charming hummingbird, Amazilia decora LC
- Mangrove hummingbird, Amazilia boucardi EN
- Azure-crowned hummingbird, Amazilia cyanocephala LC
- Berylline hummingbird, Amazilia beryllina LC
- Blue-tailed hummingbird, Amazilia cyanura LC
- Steely-vented hummingbird, Amazilia saucerottei LC
- Snowy-bellied hummingbird, Amazilia edward LC
- Rufous-tailed hummingbird, Amazilia tzacatl LC
- Buff-bellied hummingbird, Amazilia yucatanensis LC
- Cinnamon hummingbird, Amazilia rutila LC
- Violet-crowned hummingbird, Amazilia violiceps LC
- Green-fronted hummingbird, Amazilia viridifrons LC
- Copper-rumped hummingbird, Amazilia tobaci LC
- Stripe-tailed hummingbird, Eupherusa eximia LC
- Blue-capped hummingbird, Eupherusa cyanophrys EN
- White-tailed hummingbird, Eupherusa poliocerca VU
- Black-bellied hummingbird, Eupherusa nigriventris LC
- White-tailed emerald, Elvira chionura LC
- Coppery-headed emerald, Elvira cupreiceps LC
- Snowcap, Microchera albocoronata LC
- White-vented plumeleteer, Chalybura buffonii LC
- Bronze-tailed plumeleteer, Chalybura urochrysia LC
- Green-throated mountain-gem, Lampornis viridipallens LC
- Green-breasted mountain-gem, Lampornis sybillae LC
- Amethyst-throated hummingbird, Lampornis amethystinus LC
- Blue-throated hummingbird, Lampornis clemenciae LC
- White-bellied mountain-gem, Lampornis hemileucus LC
- Purple-throated mountain-gem, Lampornis calolaemus LC
- White-throated mountain-gem, Lampornis castaneoventris LC
- Garnet-throated hummingbird, Lamprolaima rhami LC
- Green-crowned brilliant, Heliodoxa jacula LC
- Magnificent hummingbird, Eugenes fulgens LC
- Greenish puffleg, Haplophaedia aureliae LC
- Purple-crowned fairy, Heliothryx barroti LC
- Long-billed starthroat, Heliomaster longirostris LC
- Plain-capped starthroat, Heliomaster constantii LC
- Bahama woodstar, Calliphlox evelynae LC
- Inagua woodstar, Calliphlox lyrura NR
- Magenta-throated woodstar, Philodice bryantae LC
- Purple-throated woodstar, Philodice mitchellii LC
- Rufous-shafted woodstar, Chaetocercus jourdanii LC
- Slender sheartail, Doricha enicura LC
- Mexican sheartail, Doricha eliza NT
- Sparkling-tailed hummingbird, Tilmatura dupontii LC
- Lucifer hummingbird, Calothorax lucifer LC
- Beautiful hummingbird, Calothorax pulcher LC
- Ruby-throated hummingbird, Archilochus colubris LC
- Black-chinned hummingbird, Archilochus alexandri LC
- Vervain hummingbird, Mellisuga minima LC
- Bee hummingbird, Mellisuga helenae NT
- Anna's hummingbird, Calypte anna LC
- Costa's hummingbird, Calypte costae LC
- Calliope hummingbird, Stellula calliope LC
- Bumblebee hummingbird, Atthis heloisa LC
- Wine-throated hummingbird, Atthis ellioti LC
- Broad-tailed hummingbird, Selasphorus platycercus LC
- Rufous hummingbird, Selasphorus rufus LC
- Allen's hummingbird, Selasphorus sasin LC
- Volcano hummingbird, Selasphorus flammula LC
- Glow-throated hummingbird, Selasphorus ardens EN
- Scintillant hummingbird, Selasphorus scintilla LC
