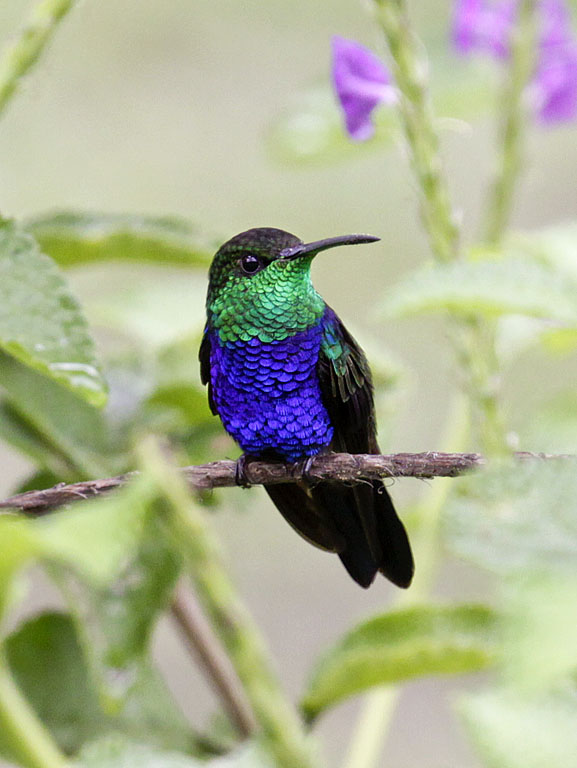
- male at Manu National Park, Peru
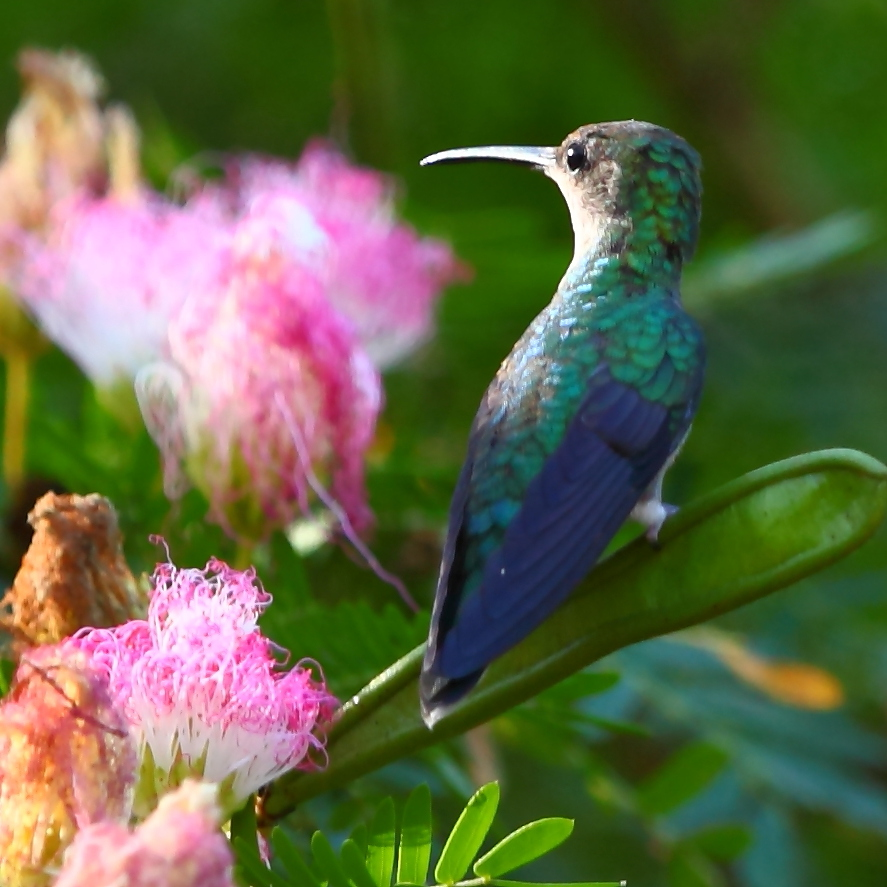
- female at Alta Floresta, Mato Grosso State, Brazil

Conservation status
- Least Concern (IUCN 3.1)
- CITES Appendix II (CITES)

Scientific classification
- Kingdom: Animalia
- Phylum: Chordata
- Class: Aves
- Clade: Strisores
- Order: Apodiformes
- Family: Trochilidae
- Genus: Thalurania
- Species: T. furcata

Binomial name
- Thalurania furcata (Gmelin, JF, 1788)

= Fork-tailed woodnymph =

Species of hummingbird

The fork-tailed woodnymph (Thalurania furcata) is a species of hummingbird in the "emeralds", tribe Trochilini of subfamily Trochilinae. It is found in every mainland South American country except Chile and Uruguay.

== Taxonomy and systematics ==
The fork-tailed woodnymph was formally described in 1788 by the German naturalist Johann Friedrich Gmelin in his revised and expanded edition of Carl Linnaeus's Systema Naturae. He placed it with all the other hummingbirds in the genus Trochilus and coined the binomial name Trochilus furcatus. The fork-tailed woodnymph is now placed with three other woodnymphs in the genus Thalurania that was introduced in 1848 by the English ornithologist John Gould. The genus name combines the Ancient Greek thalos meaning "child" with ouranos meaning "heaven". The specific epithet furcata is from Medieval Latin furcatus meaning "forked".

Thirteen subspecies of fork-tailed woodnymph are recognised:

- T. f. refulgens Gould, 1853
- T. f. furcata (Gmelin, JF, 1788)
- T. f. fissilis Berlepsch & Hartert, E, 1902
- T. f. orenocensis Hellmayr, 1921
- T. f. nigrofasciata (Gould, 1846)
- T. f. viridipectus Gould, 1848
- T. f. jelskii Taczanowski, 1874
- T. f. simoni Hellmayr, 1906
- T. f. balzani Simon, 1896
- T. f. furcatoides Gould, 1861
- T. f. boliviana Boucard, 1894
- T. f. baeri Hellmayr, 1907
- T. f. eriphile (Lesson, R, 1832)

In the early 20th century some authors treated subspecies nigrofasciata, jelskii, simoni, balzalni, and eriphile (with baeri included) as separate species. Others have treated what are now the crowned woodnymph (T. colombica) and Mexican woodnymph (Eupherusa ridgwayi) as conspecific with the fork-tailed. In addition, a few additional subspecies have been proposed but all have proved to be hybrids of this species and others.

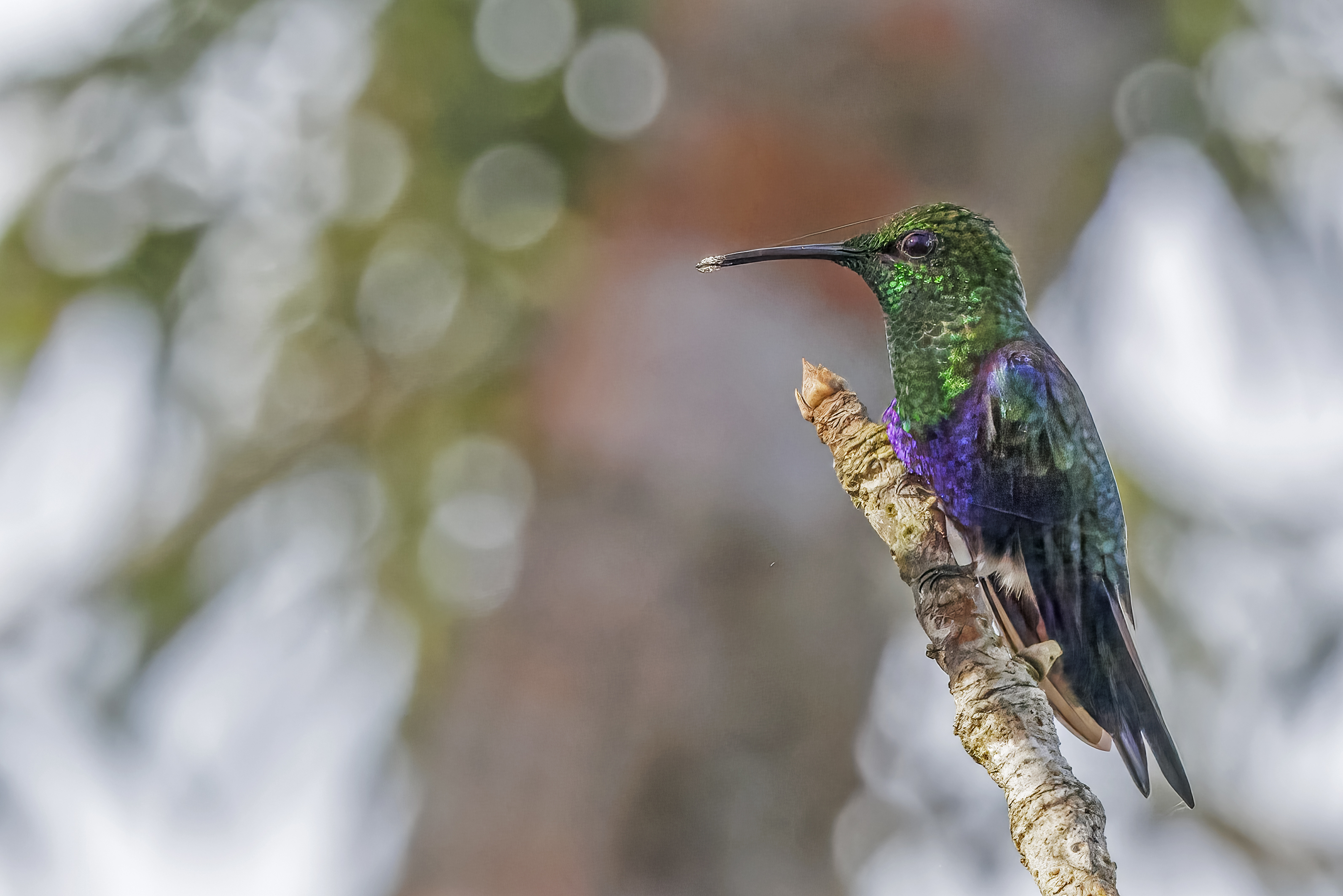
male T. f. viridipectus, Ecuador

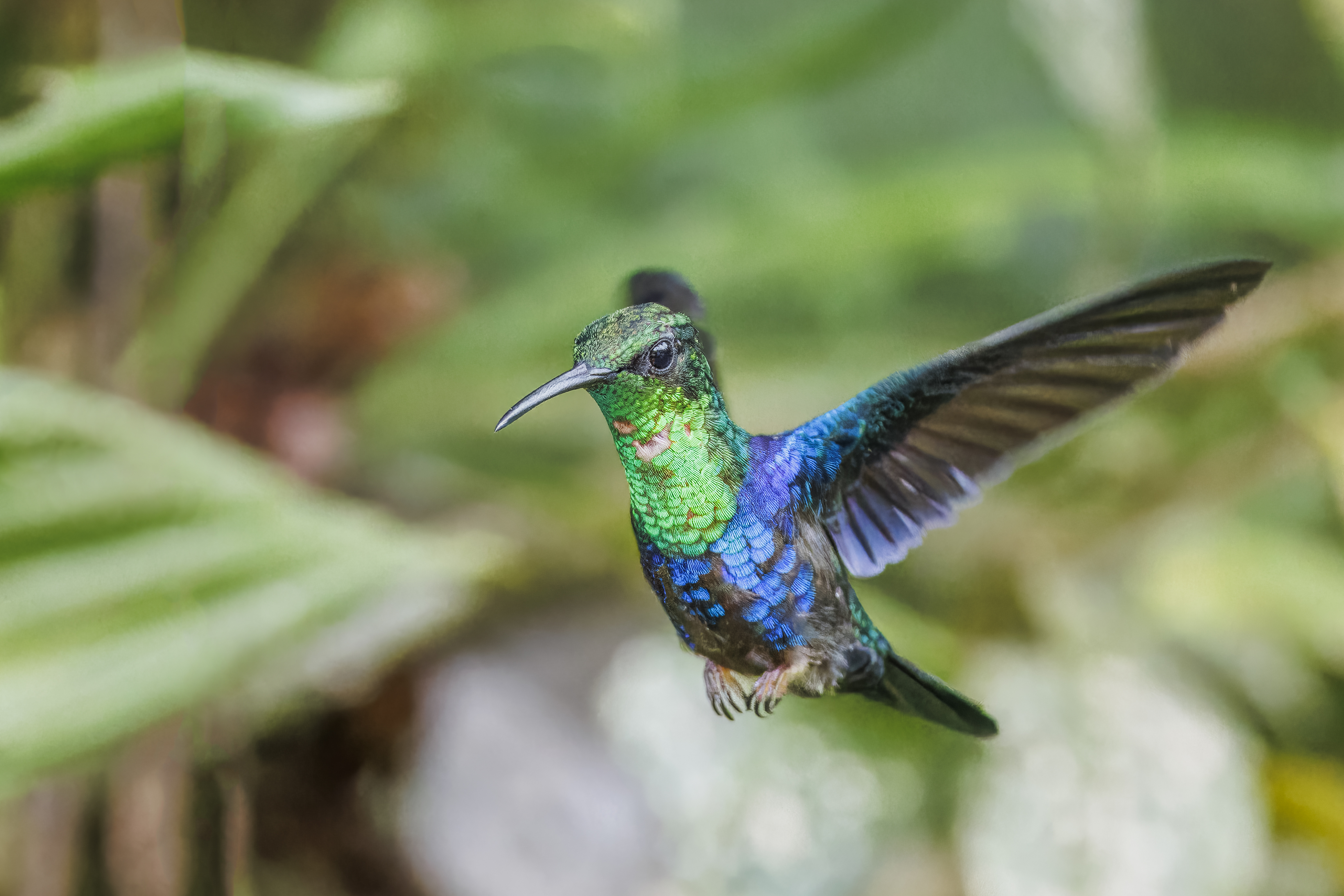
male T. f. viridipectus, Ecuador

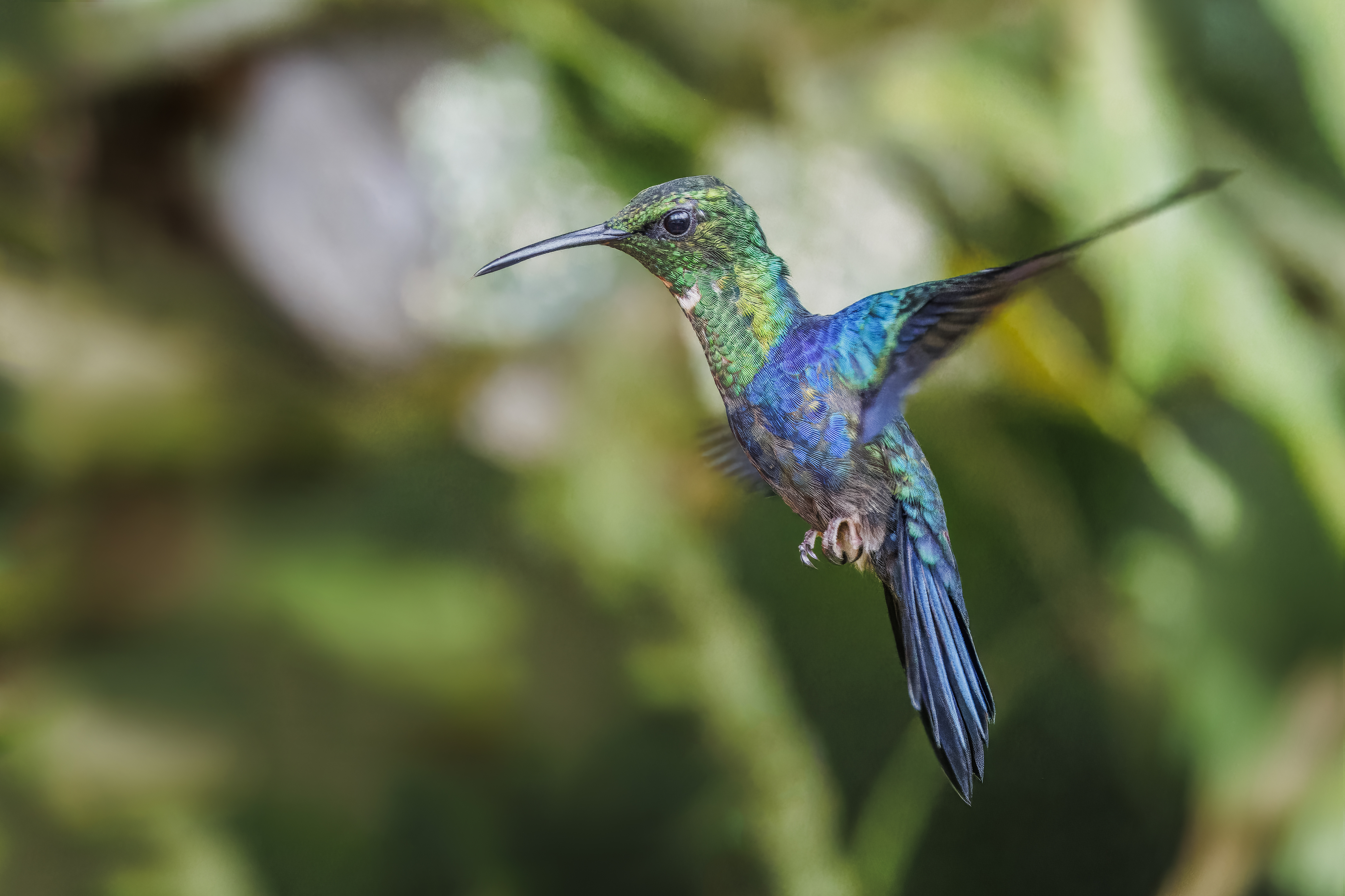
male T. f. viridipectus, Ecuador

== Description ==
Fork-tailed woodnymph males are 9.5 to 12.9 cm (3.7 to 5.1 in) long and weigh 3.6 to 6 g (0.13 to 0.21 oz). Females are 8 to 10.7 cm (3.1 to 4.2 in) long and weigh 3 to 5 g (0.11 to 0.18 oz). Both sexes of all subspecies have a straight, black, medium-length bill. Adult males of the nominate subspecies have mostly dark bronzy green upperparts, dark dusky bronze crown and nape, and a violet band across the upper back. Their throat is glittering green, the belly violet, and the undertail coverts dark steely blue with dull white edges. Their tail is forked and blue-black. The nominate adult female has bright green upperparts with a duller and more bronze crown. Its underparts are pale gray. The tail is green near the base and the rest steely blue-black with white tips on the outer three pairs of feathers. Juvenile males are dull bronze-green above and dusky bronze-green below. Juvenile females are more bronzy green above than the adult and some feathers have buffy fringes.

Subspecies T. f. refulgens and T. f. orenocensis are essentially like the nominate. T. f. fissilis males have solid blue undertail coverts. T. f. nigrofasciata males have golden-green upperparts, a band of black between the extensive green throat and the violet belly, and a gap in the violet band on the upper back. The male T. f. viridipectus also has a large green gorget with a narrow black band between it and the belly. T. f. jelskii's lower throat and breast have a blue tinge and an incomplete black band. The male T. f. balzani has a green crown and pure white undertail coverts. T. f. furcatoides males are somewhat larger than the nominate and have a blackish crown. T. f. boliviana males have a relatively small green gorget and sometimes some small black patches where others have a band. T. f. simoni is very like balzani but with a dark stripe in the center of the vent area and undertail coverts. Males of T. f. baeri and T. f. eriphile have glittering green foreheads and blackish crowns. Females of the different subspecies differ mainly in the darkness of their gray underparts and sometimes the undertail coverts; their crowns and upperparts differ much like those of the respective males.

== Distribution and habitat ==
The subspecies of fork-tailed woodnymph are found thus"

- T. f. refulgens, Paria Peninsula and Sierra de Cumaná of northeastern Venezuela
- T. f. furcata, from extreme eastern Venezuela through the Guianas to northeast Brazil north of the Amazon
- T. f. fissilis, southeastern Venezuela, extreme western Guyana, and Roraima in northern Brazil
- T. f. orenocensis, upper Orinoco basin of southern Venezuela
- T. f. nigrofasciata, Colombia's Guainía Department, southern Venezuela's Amazonas state, and the upper Rio Negro in northwestern Brazil
- T. f. viridipectus, eastern Colombia, eastern Ecuador, and northeastern Peru
- T. f. jelskii, eastern Peru and adjoining western Brazil
- T. f. simoni, south of the Amazon in extreme eastern Peru and western Brazil
- T. f. balzani, north-central Brazil south of the Amazon east to the Rio Tapajós
- T. f. furcatoides, eastern Brazil south of the Amazon east of the Tapajós
- T. f. boliviana, southeastern Peru through east-central Bolivia into Santa Cruz Department
- T. f. baeri, northeastern and central Brazil to southern Bolivia and northwestern and north-central Argentina
- T. f. eriphile, southeastern Brazil from Bahia south into Paraguay and northeastern Argentina's Misiones Province

The fork-tailed woodnymph inhabits a variety of landscapes within Amazonia. It is found in terra firme and várzea forests, especially their edges and gaps; mature secondary forest; and semi-open areas such as plantations and gardens. It is thought to also inhabit some scrublands but data are lacking. In elevation it ranges from sea level to about 2,000 m (6,600 ft)

== Behavior ==
=== Movement ===
The fork-tailed woodnymph's movements are not known in detail. It is assumed to be mostly sedentary. However, it apparently makes local movements to follow flowering events and the populations in the Andean foothills might make elevational movements.

=== Feeding ===
The fork-tailed woodnymph forages for nectar at all levels of its habitat, utilizing a wide variety of flowering plants, shrubs, vines, and trees. Males often defend flower patches against both conspecifics and other hummingbird species. Females are sometimes territorial but more often forage by trap-lining, visiting a circuit of nectar sources. In addition to nectar, the species captures small arthropods on the wing and sometimes by gleaning from foliage.

=== Breeding ===
The fork-tailed woodnymph's breeding seasons vary widely across its large range; it nests somewhere in every month of the year. Nests in Ecuador were a tiny cup of seed down bound with spiderweb with some lichen on the outside. They were attached with spiderweb to a horizontal branch between 1.5 and 2.5 m (5 and 8 ft) above the ground. The female incubates the clutch of two eggs for about 15 days and fledging occurs 22 to 25 days after hatch.

=== Vocalization ===
The fork-tailed woodnymph's song varies somewhat geographically. In Ecuador and Peru it is "an incessant series of high-pitched bisyllabic, thin wiry notes 'see-tseet...see-tseet....see-tseet...'". In eastern Venezuela it is describes as a "repeated variable series of 3–7 insect-like pulsing notes 'tsee-see-see....tsee-see-see-see-see...tsee-see-see...'". When perched it gives "a monotonously repeated single chip" and in flight "short dry chips [as a] dry trill or chatter".

== Status ==
The IUCN conservation status for the fork-tailed woodnymph lists it as being of "least concern". It has a very large range, but its population size and trend are not known. No immediate threats have been identified. It is considered common over much of its range and occurs in several protected areas. However, in some parts of Brazil, Colombia, and Paraguay deforestation might threaten it.
