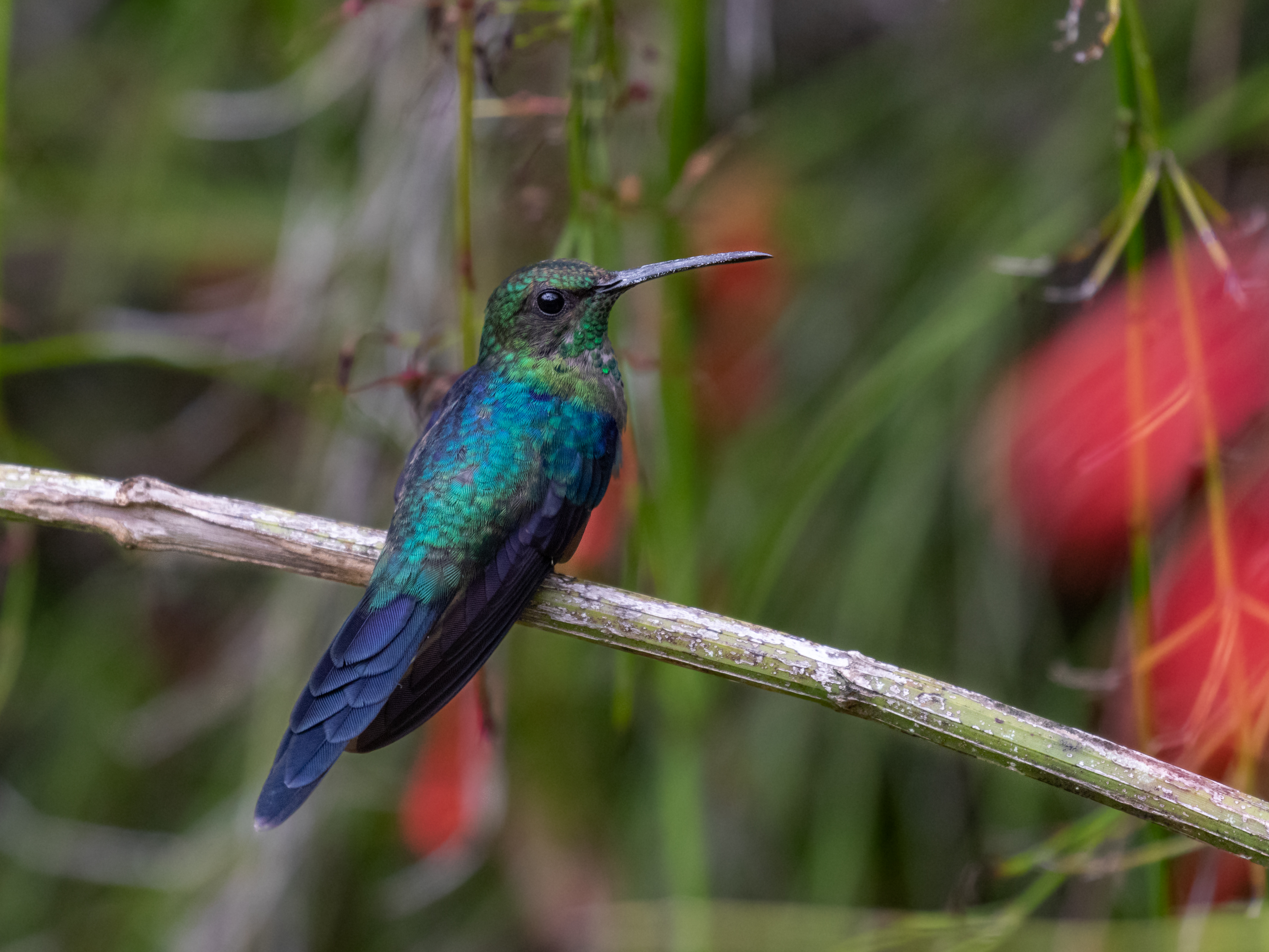

Conservation status
- Endangered (IUCN 3.1)
- CITES Appendix II

Scientific classification
- Kingdom: Animalia
- Phylum: Chordata
- Class: Aves
- Order: Apodiformes
- Family: Trochilidae
- Genus: Thalurania
- Species: T. watertonii

Binomial name
- Thalurania watertonii (Bourcier, 1847)

= Long-tailed woodnymph =

Species of bird in Brazil

The long-tailed woodnymph (Thalurania watertonii) is a species of hummingbird in the family Trochilidae. It is found in humid forest in northeastern Brazil, where it is known from the states of Pernambuco, Alagoas, Sergipe and the northernmost Bahia. It is usually thought to be widespread, but seen at low density in its increasingly fragmented range. Its population is estimated to be around 1,000–2,500 individuals, currently in decline due to deforestation and habitat loss.

== Description ==
The long-tailed woodnymph is sexually dimorphic. The males are heavier, with significantly larger wings and tails, whereas the females have longer bills. Males are approximately 11.8–13 centimetres (4.6–5.1 in) long, including a tail of 6 centimetres (2.4 in) cm; while females measure roughly 10–11 centimetres (3.9–4.3 in) in length, with a tail of 3.6 centimetres (1.4 in). Individuals have a weight of 3.7–5.2 g.

Males have a conspicuous iridescent plumage in blue, green and purple. The crown and neck are bronze-green, back is iridescent violet-blue, shining grass-green undersides and violet-blue flanks; Its long, deeply-forked tail is blue. Female plumage is much more faint, allowing them to stay unnoticeable as they build nests and care for their young, and a shorter, slightly forked white-tipped tail with a blue subterminal band and a pair of blue-green rectrices. Juveniles are similar to adult females.

== Distribution and habitat ==
This species is restricted to the Brazilian states of Pernambuco, Alagoas, Sergipe and apparently to northern Bahia, though there are no recent records. The species is thought to be found only in the Atlantic Forest. Reports from eastern Pará are possibly inaccurate, and there is one specimen which was attributed to Guyana, although its true origin is unknown.

The long-tailed woodnymph inhabits coastal lowland habitats such as coastal rainforest, cerrado, plantations and parks throughout its Atlantic forest range, from sea-level to 550 metres (1,800 ft). It forages at low to medium heights, generally at the periphery of vegetation.

== Ecology and behavior ==
The long-tailed woodnymph feeds on the nectar of flowering vines, cacti, epiphytes, trees and bushes, occasionally foraging on invertebrates captured in the air. Male establishes feeding territories, which are aggressively defended against intraspecific and interspecific intruders.

Breeding takes place between November and February. The woodnymph builds a cup-shaped nest made of fine rootlets and moss, tightly tied together by a spider's web. The nest is attached to a horizontal branch in a shrub or small tree, usually protected by overhanging leaves, 1.5–2.5 metres (4.9–8.2 ft) above the ground. The female typically lays two eggs, with an incubation period of 14–15 days, often carried by the female.

== Conservation status ==
Thalurania watertonii is listed as endangered by the IUCN Red List, due to the ongoing reduction of its populations, mainly due to the extensive and continuing loss of habitat and the depletion of lowland forests in north-eastern Brazil. Its occupation area is currently less than 500 km^{2}. The population is severely fragmented, with the total population estimated to be less than 2,500 individuals, and each subpopulation contains less than 250 of them.
