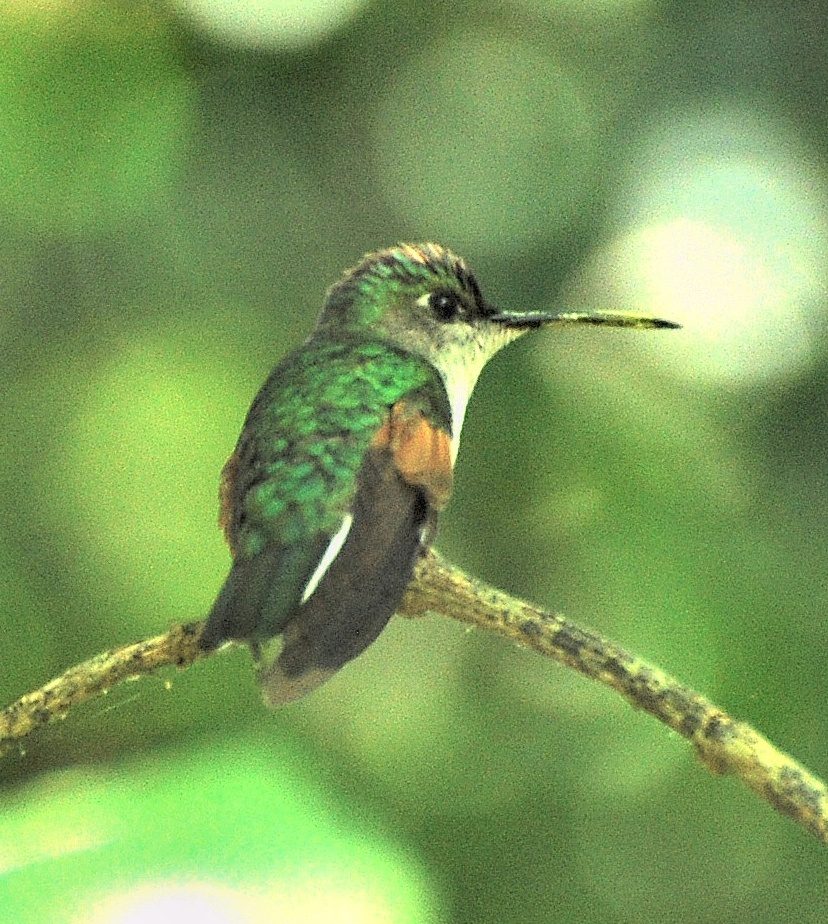
- Oaxaca hummingbird, Eupherusa cyanophrys

Scientific classification
- Kingdom: Animalia
- Phylum: Chordata
- Class: Aves
- Order: Apodiformes
- Family: Trochilidae
- Tribe: Trochilini
- Genus: Eupherusa; Gould, 1857

Type species
- Ornismya eximia DeLattre, 1843

Species
- 5, see text

= Eupherusa =

Genus of birds

Eupherusa is a genus of hummingbirds in the family Trochilidae. It contains the following five species:

Genus Eupherusa – Gould, 1857 – five species
Common name	Scientific name and subspecies	Range	Size and ecology	IUCN status and estimated population
Mexican woodnymph	Eupherusa ridgwayi (Nelson, 1900)	west Mexico	Size: Habitat: Diet:	VU
Oaxaca hummingbird	Eupherusa cyanophrys Rowley & Orr, 1964	Sierra Madre del Sur in the Mexican state of Oaxaca	Size: Habitat: Diet:	EN
Stripe-tailed hummingbird	Eupherusa eximia (Delattre, 1843)	southeastern Mexico to Panama.	Size: Habitat: Diet:	LC
Black-bellied hummingbird	Eupherusa nigriventris Lawrence, 1868	Costa Rica and Panama	Size: Habitat: Diet:	LC
White-tailed hummingbird	Eupherusa poliocerca Elliot, 1871	Sierra Madre del Sur in Guerrero and extreme western Oaxaca, Mexico	Size: Habitat: Diet:	NT

The Mexican woodnymph was formerly placed in the genus Thalurania with other species with "woodnymph" in their English names. A molecular phylogenetic study published in 2014 found that Thalurania was non-monophyletic and that the Mexican woodnymph is closely related to species in Eupherusa. Based on this result the Mexican woodnymph is now placed in Eupherusa.
