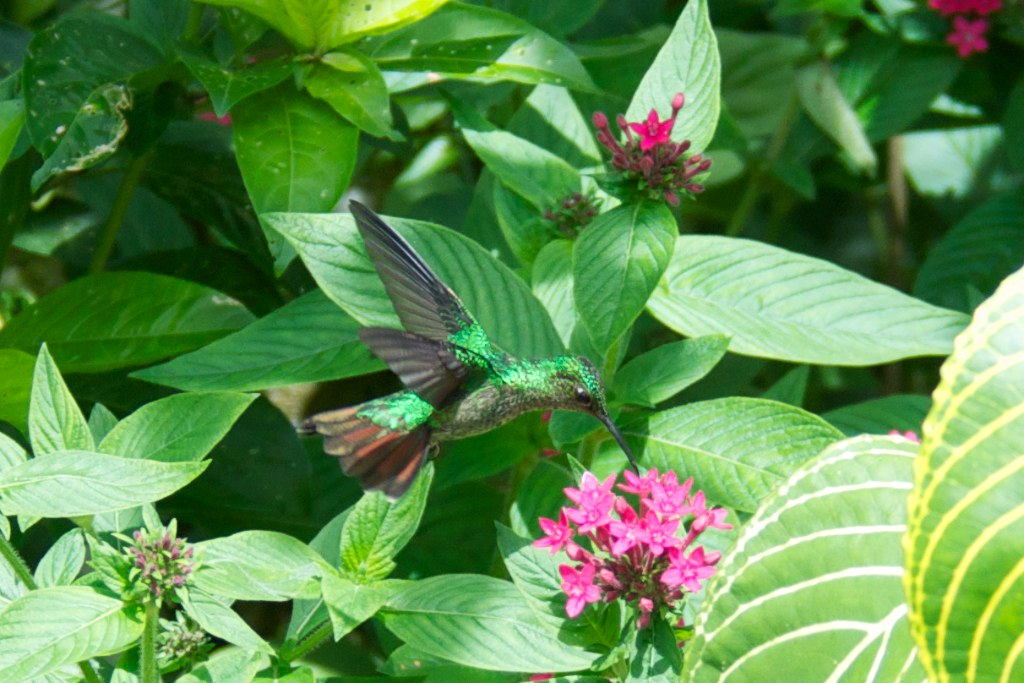
- Violet-capped hummingbird, (Goldmania violiceps)

Scientific classification
- Kingdom: Animalia
- Phylum: Chordata
- Class: Aves
- Order: Apodiformes
- Family: Trochilidae
- Tribe: Trochilini
- Genus: Goldmania; Nelson, 1911

Type species
- Goldmania violiceps Nelson, 1911

Species
- 2, see text

= Goldmania =

Genus of birds

Goldmania is a genus in the family of Hummingbirds, and consists of 2 species.

== Species ==
The two species are:

Genus Goldmania – Nelson, 1911 – two species
Common name	Scientific name and subspecies	Range	Size and ecology	IUCN status and estimated population
Violet-capped hummingbird	Goldmania violiceps Nelson, 1911	Costa Rica and Panama	Size: Habitat: Diet:	NT
Pirre hummingbird	Goldmania bella (Nelson, 1912)	Panama and far northwestern Colombia	Size: Habitat: Diet:	NT

The Pirre hummingbird was formerly placed in the monospecific genus Goethalsia. A molecular phylogenetic study published in 2014 found that the Pirre hummingbird was closely related to the violet-capped hummingbird in the genus Goldmania. The two species were therefore placed together in Goldmania which has priority.
