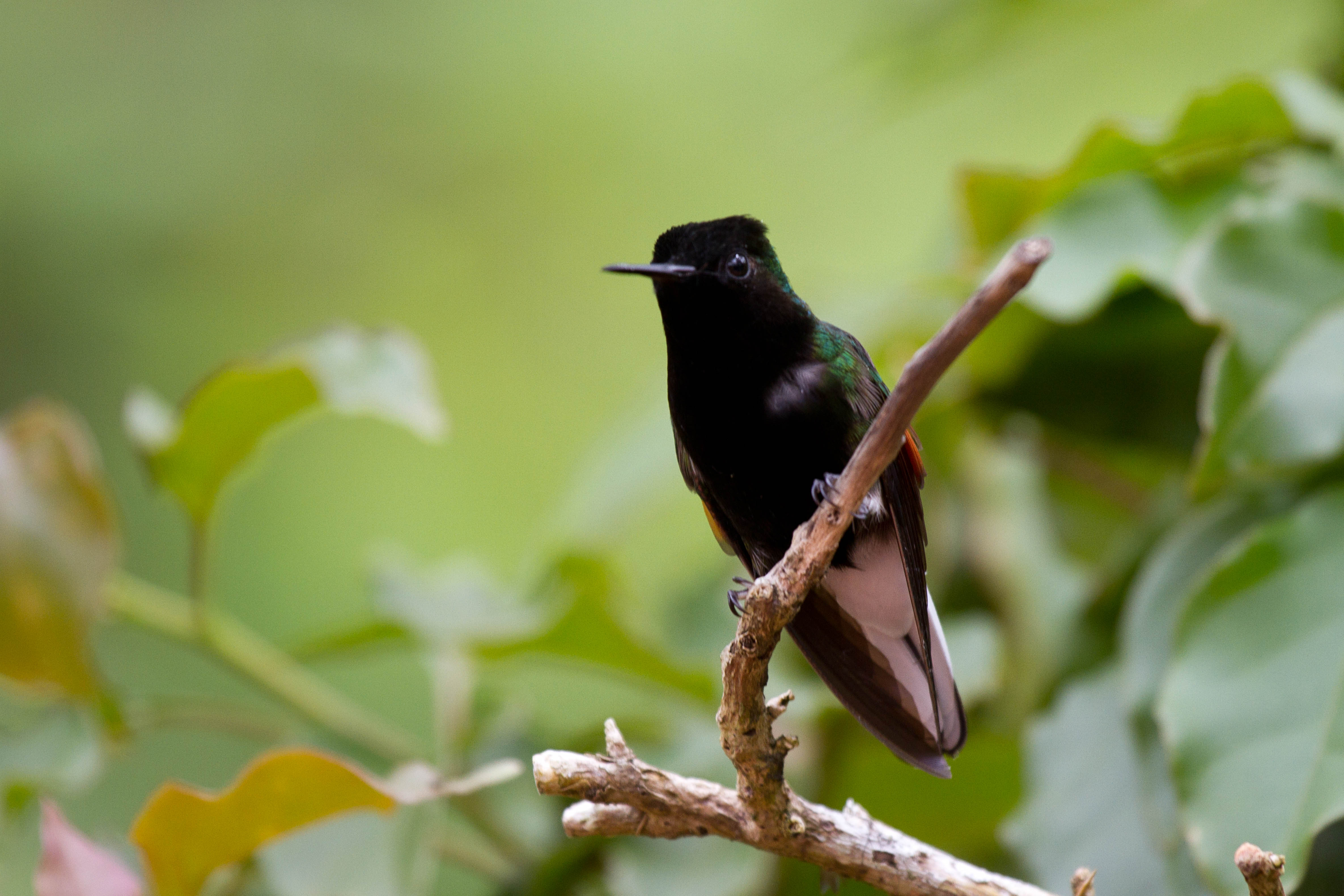

Conservation status
- Least Concern (IUCN 3.1)
- CITES Appendix II (CITES)

Scientific classification
- Kingdom: Animalia
- Phylum: Chordata
- Class: Aves
- Clade: Strisores
- Order: Apodiformes
- Family: Trochilidae
- Genus: Eupherusa
- Species: E. nigriventris

Binomial name
- Eupherusa nigriventris Lawrence, 1868

= Black-bellied hummingbird =

The black-bellied hummingbird (Eupherusa nigriventris) is a species of hummingbird in the "emeralds", tribe Trochilini of subfamily Trochilinae. It is found in Costa Rica and Panama.

== Taxonomy and systematics ==
The black-bellied hummingbird is monotypic. It and the stripe-tailed hummingbird (E. eximia) are sister species.

== Description ==
The black-bellied hummingbird is 7 to 8 cm (2.8 to 3.1 in) long and weighs about 3.0 to 3.5 g (0.11 to 0.12 oz). Males have a black breast and belly that provide the species' English name; their forehead and face are also black. The sides of the breast are green and the undertail coverts white. They have mostly bronze green upperparts with narrow black edges on the crown feathers and dull bronze uppertail coverts. Their central tail feathers are dull black with a bronze gloss and the outer ones white. The female has grayish white underparts with white undertail coverts. It has metallic bronze green upperparts that are more bronze on the uppertail coverts. Both sexes molt after breeding but males do so one to two months before the female.

== Distribution and habitat ==
The black-bellied hummingbird is found through Costa Rica into western Panama, mostly on the Caribbean slope. It inhabits the edges and interior of humid montane forest at elevations between about 600 and 2,000 m (2,000 and 6,600 ft).

== Behavior ==
=== Movement ===
The black-bellied hummingbird is mostly a year-round resident, but some move to the lower elevations after breeding.

=== Feeding ===
Male black-bellied hummingbirds typically forage for nectar in the forest canopy and females more often do so in the understory and at edges. Males sometimes defend flowering trees even when larger hummingbird species are present. The species' nectar sources include Inga and Pithecellobium trees; epiphytes (Ericaceae, Columnea, Elleanthus, and Norantea); and understory Psychotria, Witheringia, and Besleria. In one study it demonstrated greater interest in short flower types than long. In addition to nectar, the species also feeds on small arthropods.

=== Breeding ===
The black-bellied hummingbird's breeding season in Cost Rica is mostly from October to March but may start as early as July. It tends to breed in synchrony with the flowering of canopy epiphytes and some other plants. Females make a cup nest of tree fern scales bound with spiderweb with some moss and lichen on the outside. It is typically placed 2 to 4 m (7 to 10 ft) above the ground, often under a large overhanging leaf. The clutch size is two eggs; the incubation period and time to fledging are not known.

=== Vocalization ===
The black-bellied hummingbird's song is "a high, thin, sputtering warble", typically given from perches at the edge of gaps in the forest. Its calls include "a sharp, high-pitched tseep or peet" and "a high, tsittering in chases".

== Status ==
The IUCN has assessed the black-bellied hummingbird as being of Least Concern, though it has a fairly small range and its population size and trend are unknown. No immediate threats have been identified. In Costa Rica it is considered "uncommon to locally abundant" but "potentially is vulnerable to habitat loss."
