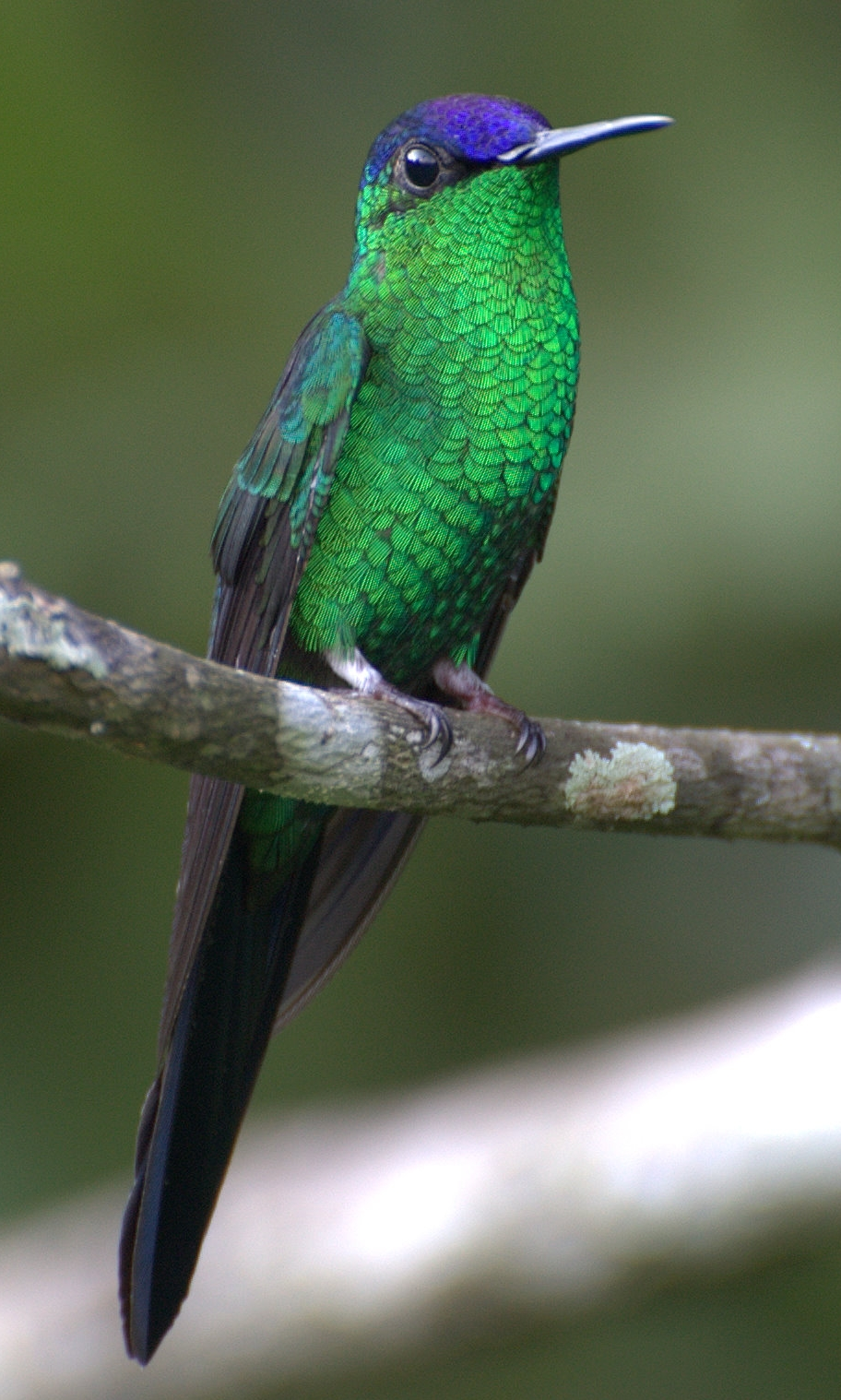
- Male violet-capped woodnymph (Thalurania glaucopis)

Scientific classification
- Kingdom: Animalia
- Phylum: Chordata
- Class: Aves
- Order: Apodiformes
- Family: Trochilidae
- Tribe: Trochilini
- Genus: Thalurania; Gould, 1848

Type species
- Trochilus furcatus (fork-tailed woodnymph) Gmelin, JF, 1788

Species
- See text

= Woodnymph =

Genus of birds

Woodnymphs are hummingbirds in the genus Thalurania. Males are green and violet-blue, while females are green with white-tipped tails and at least partially whitish underparts. Both sexes have an almost straight, entirely black bill and little or no white post-ocular spot. They are found in forest (primarily humid) and tall second growth. The species in this genus are almost entirely allo- or parapatric, and a species is present virtually everywhere in the tropical humid Neotropics.

== Taxonomy ==
The genus Thalurania was introduced in 1848 by the English ornithologist John Gould. Gould did not specify a type species but this was designated as the fork-tailed woodnymph by George Robert Gray in 1855. The genus name combines the Ancient Greek thalos meaning "child" with ouranos meaning "heaven".

The genus contains four species:

- Crowned woodnymph (Thalurania colombica)
- Fork-tailed woodnymph (Thalurania furcata)
- Violet-capped woodnymph (Thalurania glaucopis)
- Long-tailed woodnymph (Thalurania watertonii)

In 2009 an additional species was described as the black-capped woodnymph (T. nigricapilla). It is reportedly restricted to Valle del Cauca in Colombia and lacks iridescence to its crown, but at present no official authority (beyond the describers themselves) recognizes it as valid.

This genus formerly included the Mexican woodnymph. A molecular phylogenetic study published in 2014 found that Thalurania was non-monophyletic and that the Mexican woodnymph was closely related to species in the genus Eupherusa. Based on this result the Mexican woodnymph is now placed in Eupherusa. The same study found that the genus Thalurania was sister to the genus Chalybura containing the plumeleteers.
