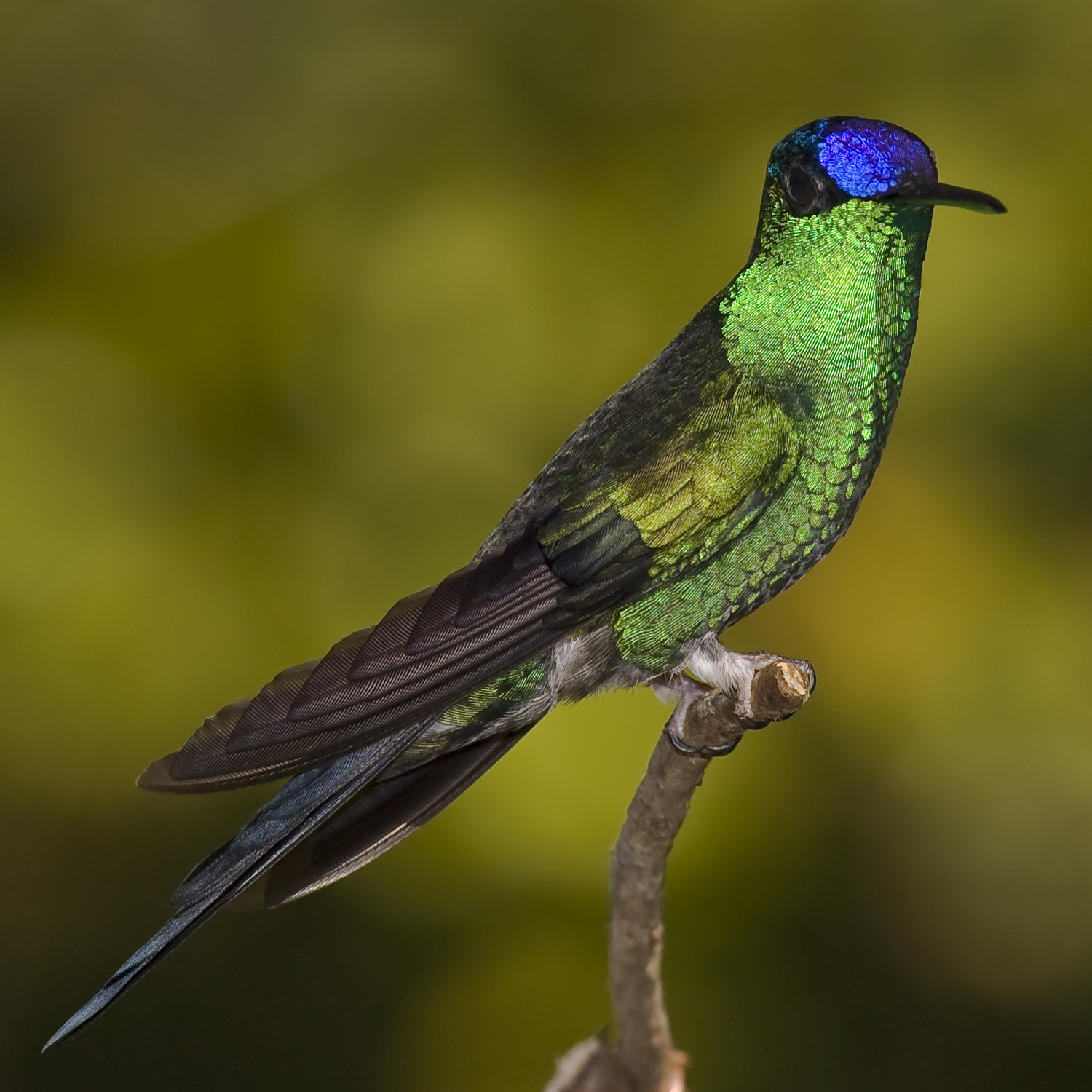
- Male at Campo Limpo Paulista, São Paulo State, Brazil
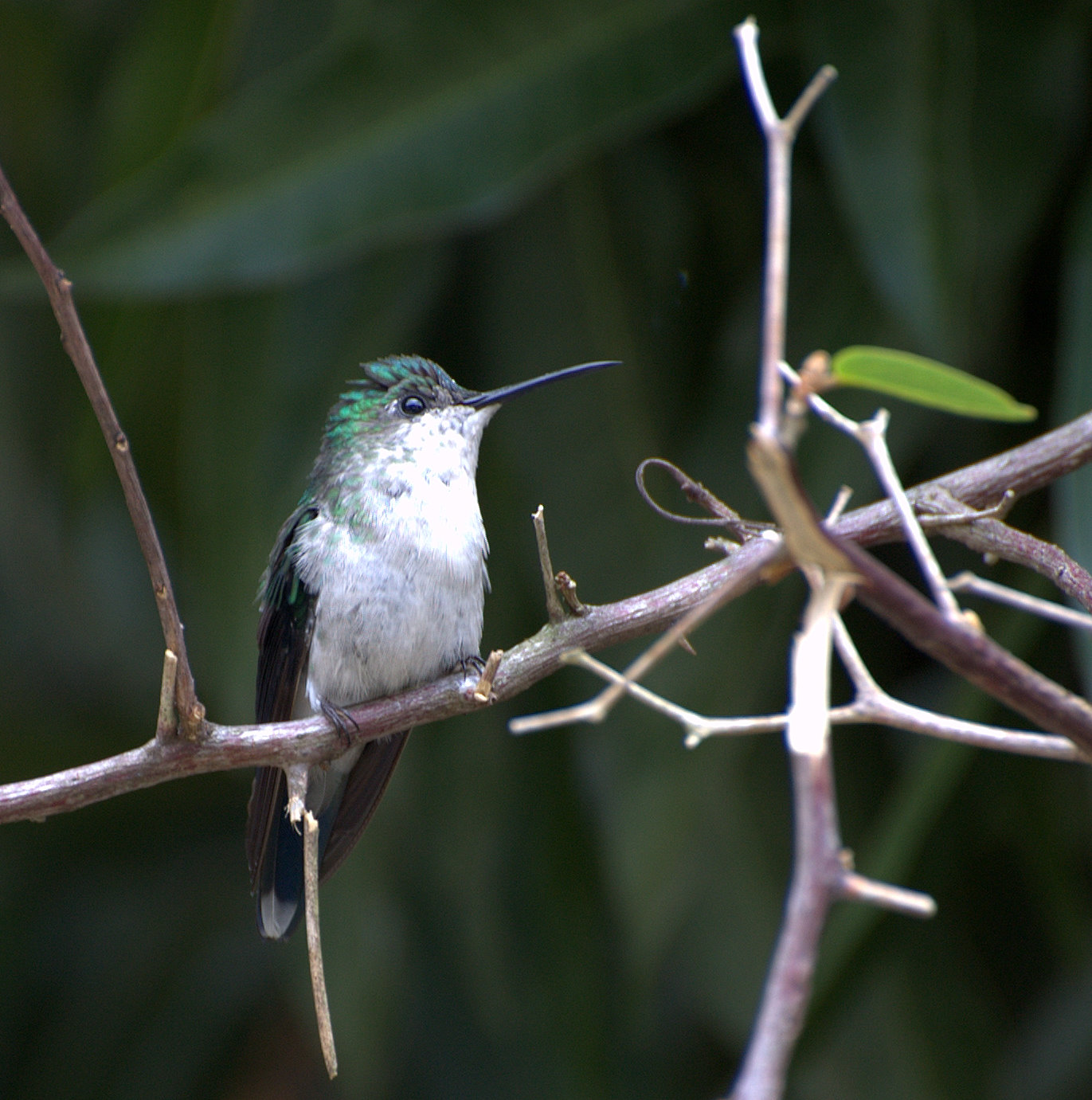
- Female at Ilhabela, São Paulo State, Brazil

Conservation status
- Least Concern (IUCN 3.1)
- CITES Appendix II

Scientific classification
- Kingdom: Animalia
- Phylum: Chordata
- Class: Aves
- Clade: Strisores
- Order: Apodiformes
- Family: Trochilidae
- Genus: Thalurania
- Species: T. glaucopis

Binomial name
- Thalurania glaucopis (Gmelin, JF, 1788)

= Violet-capped woodnymph =

Species of hummingbird

The violet-capped woodnymph (Thalurania glaucopis) is a species of hummingbird in the "emeralds", tribe Trochilini of subfamily Trochilinae. It is found in Argentina, Brazil, Paraguay, and Uruguay.

== Taxonomy and systematics ==
The violet-capped woodnymph was formally described in 1788 by the German naturalist Johann Friedrich Gmelin in his revised and expanded edition of Carl Linnaeus's Systema Naturae. He placed it with all the other hummingbirds in the genus Trochilus and coined the binomial name Trochilus glaucopis. Gmelin based his description on "L'oiseau-mouche à queue fourchue du Brésil" that had been described and illustrated in 1760 by the French zoologist Mathurin Jacques Brisson from a preserved specimen that had been sent to Paris from Brazil. The violet-capped woodnymph is now placed with three other woodnymphs in the genus Thalurania that was introduced in 1848 by the English ornithologist John Gould. The genus name combines the Ancient Greek thalos meaning "child" with ouranos meaning "heaven". The specific epithet glaucopis is from the Ancient Greek glaukos meaning "blue-grey" or "glaucous" with ōps meaning "face". The species is treated as monotypic: no subspecies are recognized.

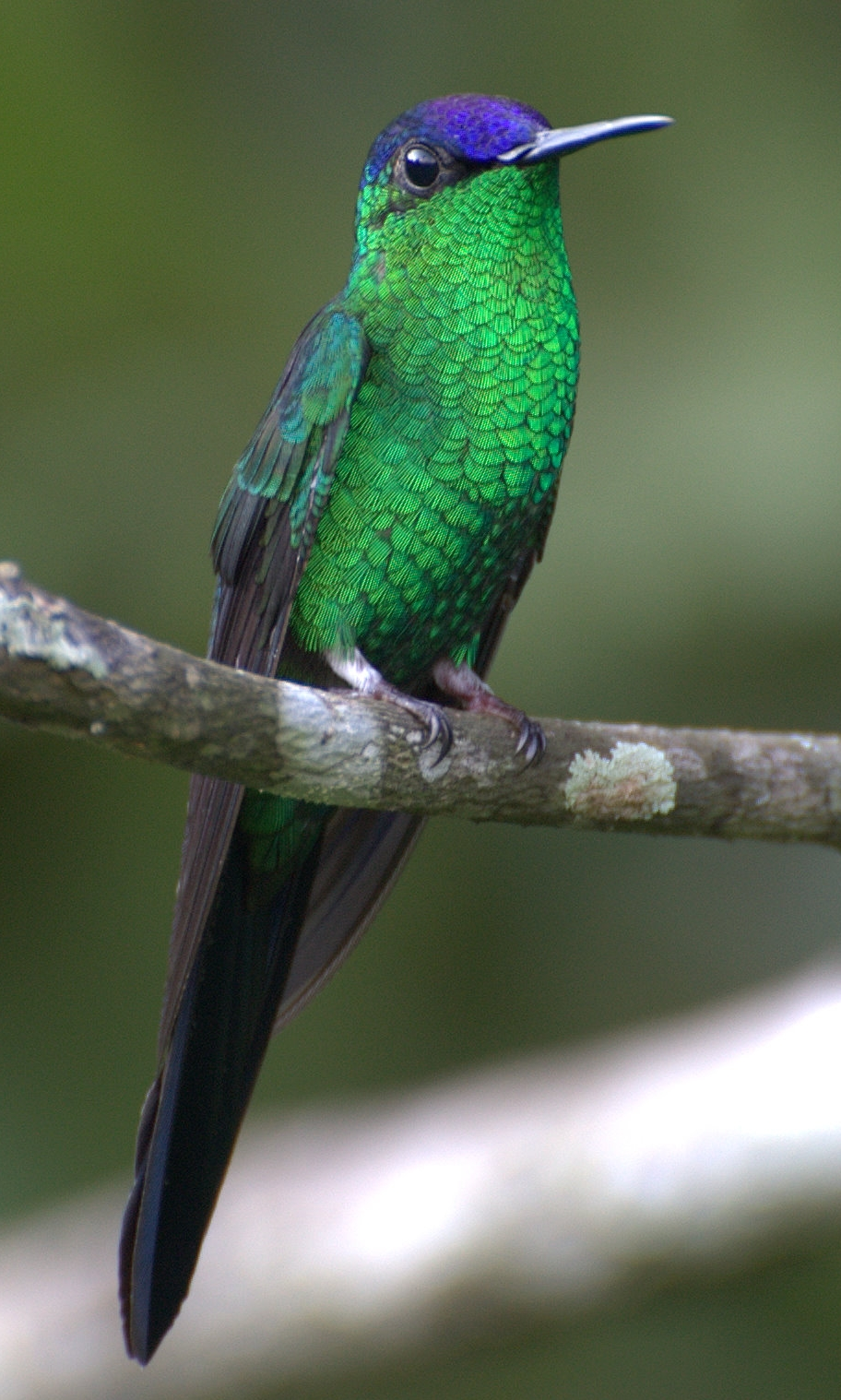
Male

== Description ==
The violet-capped hummingbird is 8 to 11 cm (3.1 to 4.3 in) long. Males weigh 4 to 6.1 g (0.14 to 0.22 oz) and females 4 to 5 g (0.14 to 0.18 oz). Both sexes have a medium length straight bill that is blackish and sometimes has a dark brown tip to the mandible. The adult male has a glittering violet-blue forehead and crown, dark golden-green upperparts, and a steel blue forked tail. Its underparts are brilliant green with greenish to bluish undertail coverts. The adult female is entirely green above and dirty white to pale buff below. Its tail is only slightly forked; its inner feathers are metallic green and the outer ones steel blue with white tips. Subadult males have a turquoise-blue forehead and crown, whitish bars on the thoat feathers, and grayish brown areas on its underparts.

== Distribution and habitat ==
The violet-capped woodnymph is found in eastern and southeastern Brazil from Bahia to Rio Grande do Sul, northeastern Argentina's Misiones Province, eastern Paraguay, and northern Uruguay. It inhabits the interior and edges of primary forest, scrublands, and suburban and urban parks and gardens. In elevation it ranges from sea level to 850 m (2,800 ft).

== Behavior ==
=== Movement ===
The violet-capped woodnymph is a short-distance migrant but details are not known. It is found in Paraguay only in the non-breeding season.

=== Feeding ===
The violet-capped woodnymph forages for nectar at all levels of its habitat and from a very wide variety of flowering plants, shrubs, and trees. In addition to nectar it captures small insects by hawking from a perch and by gleaning from vegetation.

=== Breeding ===
The violet-capped woodnymph's breeding season spans from September to February. It makes a bowl nest of soft plant down and fibers with fern scales and lichen on the outside. It is typically placed on a horizontal branch or fork between 1.5 and 3 m (5 and 10 ft) above the ground. The female incubates the clutch of two eggs for about 15 days and fledging occurs 20 to 25 days after hatch.

=== Vocalization ===
What is thought to be the violet-capped woodnymph's song is "a monotonous rapid series of evenly spaced metallic chips, 'chip..chip..chip...'". In flight it makes "short dry chips, often [as a] dry trill or chatter".

== Status ==
The IUCN has assessed the violet-capped woodnymph as being of Least Concern. It has a large range but its population size and trend are not known. No immediate threats have been identified. It is "[o]ne of commonest trochilids in SE Brazil" and occurs in many protected areas there.
