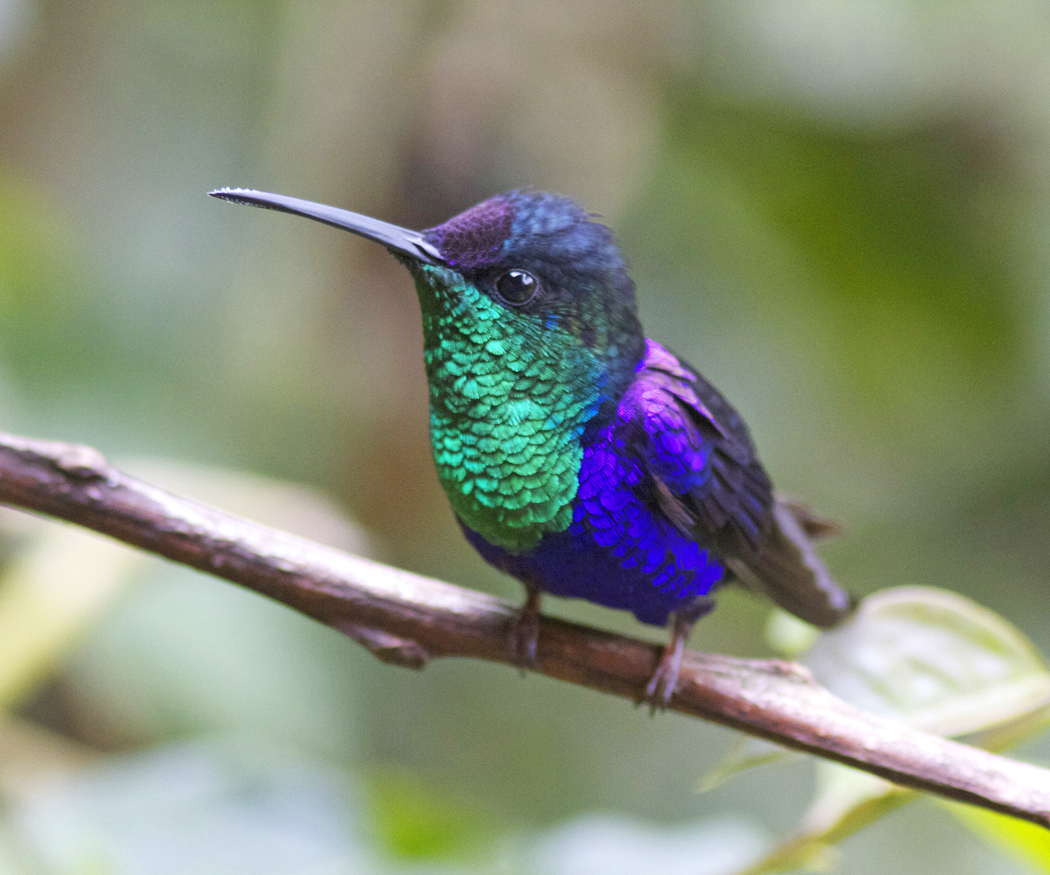
- Male in Costa Rica
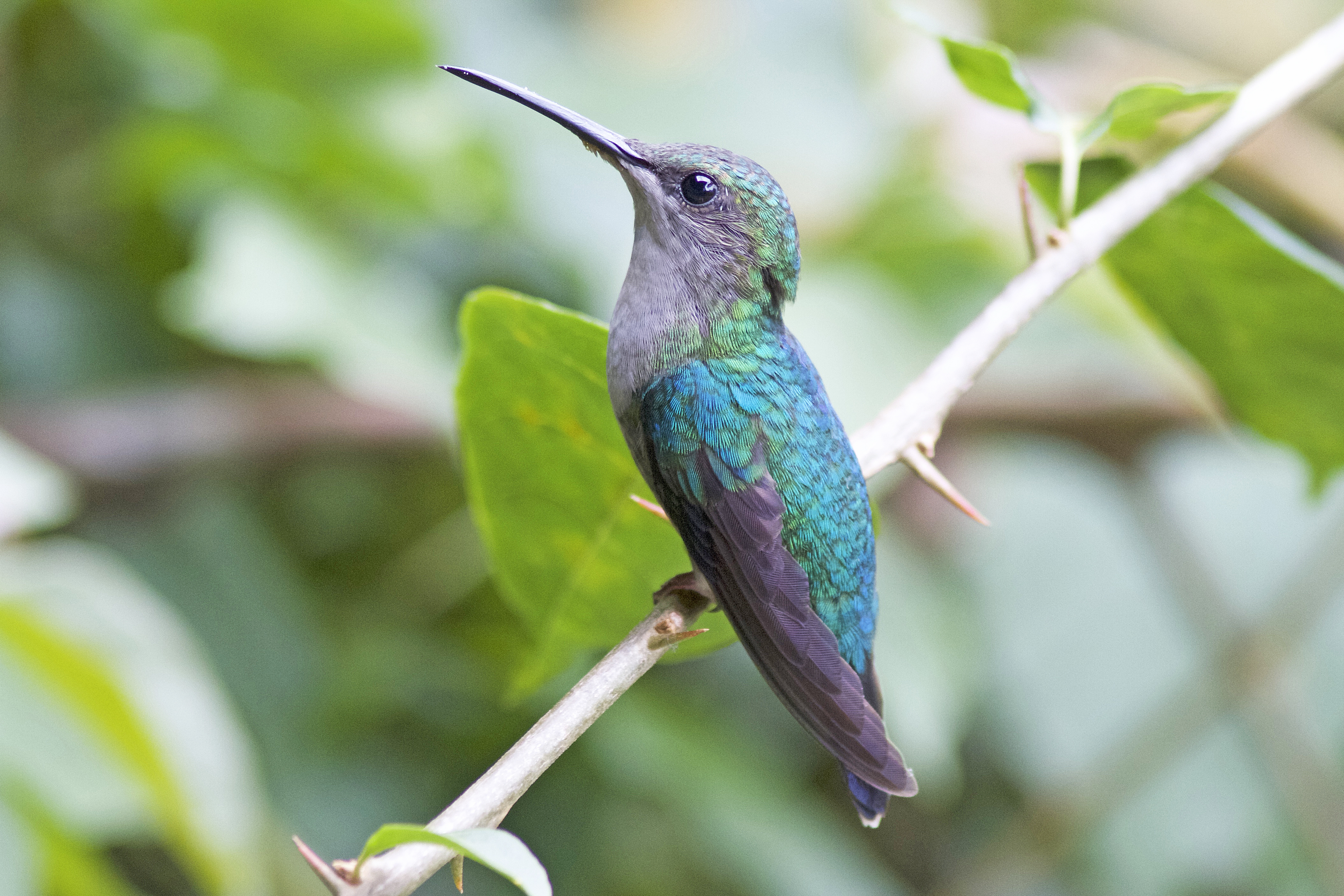
- Female in Costa Rica

Conservation status
- Least Concern (IUCN 3.1)
- CITES Appendix II

Scientific classification
- Kingdom: Animalia
- Phylum: Chordata
- Class: Aves
- Order: Apodiformes
- Family: Trochilidae
- Genus: Thalurania
- Species: T. colombica

Binomial name
- Thalurania colombica (Bourcier, 1843)

= Crowned woodnymph =

Species of hummingbird

The crowned woodnymph (Thalurania colombica) or violet-crowned woodnymph, is a species of hummingbird in the "emeralds", tribe Trochilini of subfamily Trochilinae. It is found from Belize and Guatemala to far-northern Peru.

== Taxonomy and systematics ==
The crowned woodnymph was formally described in 1843 by the French ornithologist Jules Bourcier from a specimen collected in Colombia. He coined the binomial name Ornismya colombica. This species is now placed in the genus Thalurania that was introduced by John Gould in 1848.

Seven subspecies are recognised:

- T. c. townsendi Ridgway, 1888
- T. c. venusta (Gould, 1851)
- T. c. colombica (Bourcier, 1843)
- T. c. rostrifera Phelps & Phelps Jr, 1956
- T. c. fannyae (Delattre & Bourcier, 1846)
- T. c. subtropicalis Griscom, 1932
- T. c. verticeps (Gould, 1851)
- T. c. hypochlora Gould, 1871

From about 1992 until 2012 or 2013, T. c. fannyae was treated as a separate species, the green-crowned woodnymph, with T. c. subtropicalis and T. c. verticeps as subspecies. Some authors also treated T. c. hypochlora separately as the emerald-bellied woodnymph.

The Mexican woodnymph (Eupherusa ridgwayi) has sometimes been treated as a subspecies of the crowned woodnymph.

== Description ==
Male crowned woodnymphs are 9.5 to 11.5 cm (3.7 to 4.5 in) long and weigh 4 to 5.5 g (0.14 to 0.19 oz). Females are 8.5 to 9.2 cm (3.3 to 3.6 in) long and weigh 3.5 to 4.2 g (0.12 to 0.15 oz). Adult males of the nominate subspecies T. c. colombica have a violet forehead, crown, upper back, and belly. Their nape is dark bronzy green and lower back and rump dark bluish green. Their throat and chest are glittering green. Their deeply forked tail is blue-black. Adult females have bright green upperparts, pale gray throat and chest, and darker gray belly. The tail is blue-black with white tips on the outer three pairs of feathers. Immature males have dusky crown, throat, and underparts with very limited iridescent purple feathers. Immature females have dull green upperparts and entirely pale gray underparts.

Males of subspecies T. c. townsendi have a bronze nape and a green belly with violet on the sides. Females are dark gray below. T. c. venusta males are larger than the nominate with a longer tail and have a very dark blue-green nape. The female's belly is much darker gray than that of the nominate and has a green gloss. T. c. rostrifera males are very like the nominate but with an all-green back.

T. c. fannyae males replace the nominate's violet forehead and crown with glittering green but are otherwise very similar. Females are essentially the same as the nominate but with somewhat darker gray underparts. The T. c. subtropicalis male is like fannyae but with a more bronzy nape and less violet on the back. Females have paler gray underparts. T. c. verticeps males have an entirely green back. Males of T. c. hypochlora have a mostly green belly with a little violet, a blue nape and sides of the breast, and white fringes on the undertail coverts. Females are entirely pale gray below with white fringes on the undertail coverts.

== Distribution and habitat ==
The subspecies of crowned woodnymph are distributed thus:

- T. c. townsendi, eastern Guatemala and Belize to southeastern Honduras
- T. c. venusta, eastern Nicaragua to central Panama
- T. c. colombica, northern Colombia to the head of the Magdalena River valley and east into northwestern Venezuela
- T. c. rostrifera, northwestern Venezuela's Táchira state
- T. c. fannyae, eastern Panama to southwestern Colombia
- T. c. subtropicalis, Cauca Valley and nearby Western and Central Andes of west-central Colombia
- T. c. verticeps, Pacific slope of extreme southwestern Colombia and western Ecuador
- T. c. hypochlora, Pacific lowlands of souther Ecuador and northwestern Peru

The crowned woodnymph inhabits the interior, edges, and clearings of humid primary and mature secondary forest as well as semi-open landscapes like coffee and cacao plantations and gardens. It shuns open scrublands.

== Behavior ==
=== Movement ===
In Costa Rica the crowned woodnymph breeds between sea level and as high as 900 m (3,000 ft) and moves as high as 1,200 m (3,900 ft) afterwards; it also moves locally to follow flowering events. The species breeds up to 130 m (430 ft) in Panama, between 1,600 and 2,000 m (5,200 and 6,600 ft) in Colombia and Venezuela, and only as high as 950 m (3,100 ft) in Peru. Post-breeding movements outside Costa Rica, if any, have not been studied.

=== Feeding ===
The crowned woodnymph feeds on nectar from a variety of flowering plants. It forages at epiphytes, large herbs, shrubs, and small trees but seldom at large trees, and tends to feed in covered or semi-open areas rather than open ones. During the breeding season males tend to forage in the canopy and females in the understory, but outside that season both forage at all levels. Both sexes defend rich nectar sources, but studies have shown territorial differences between them. Females are more aggressive than males in defending their territory. Females' territories also received more intruders than males, and produced higher mean nectar volume.

In addition to nectar, the crowned woodnymph feeds on small arthropods. Both sexes capture them by hawking from a perch, usually in the canopy or along edges and gaps. Both also glean prey from foliage but females do so more than males.

=== Breeding ===
The crowned woodnymph's breeding seasons vary across its range, from February to June in Costa Rica, March in Panama, February to September in northwestern Colombia, March to at least August in northern and central Colombia, and almost any part of the year in southwestern Colombia. The nest is a cup of treefern scales and plant down bound with spiderweb, with lichen and moss on the outside. It is typically placed on a horizontal twig under a leaf, and usually up to 5 m (20 ft) above the ground but sometimes higher. The clutch size is two eggs. The incubation length and time to fledging are not known.

=== Vocalization ===
What is thought to be the crowned woodnymph's song is "a monotonously repeated, single, plaintive squeaky chip, 'ksit...ksit...ksit..'". It also makes "short dry chips [sometimes] as dry trill or chatter".

== Status ==
The IUCN has assessed the crowned woodnymph as being of Least Concern. It has a very large range, but its population size is unknown and believed to be decreasing. No immediate threats have been identified. It is "[o]ne of the commonest forest hummingbirds over most of [its] range" though uncommon in Peru. Much of its habitat in Central America and northern Colombia has been deforested, but it appears to be able to use fragmented forest.

== Gallery ==
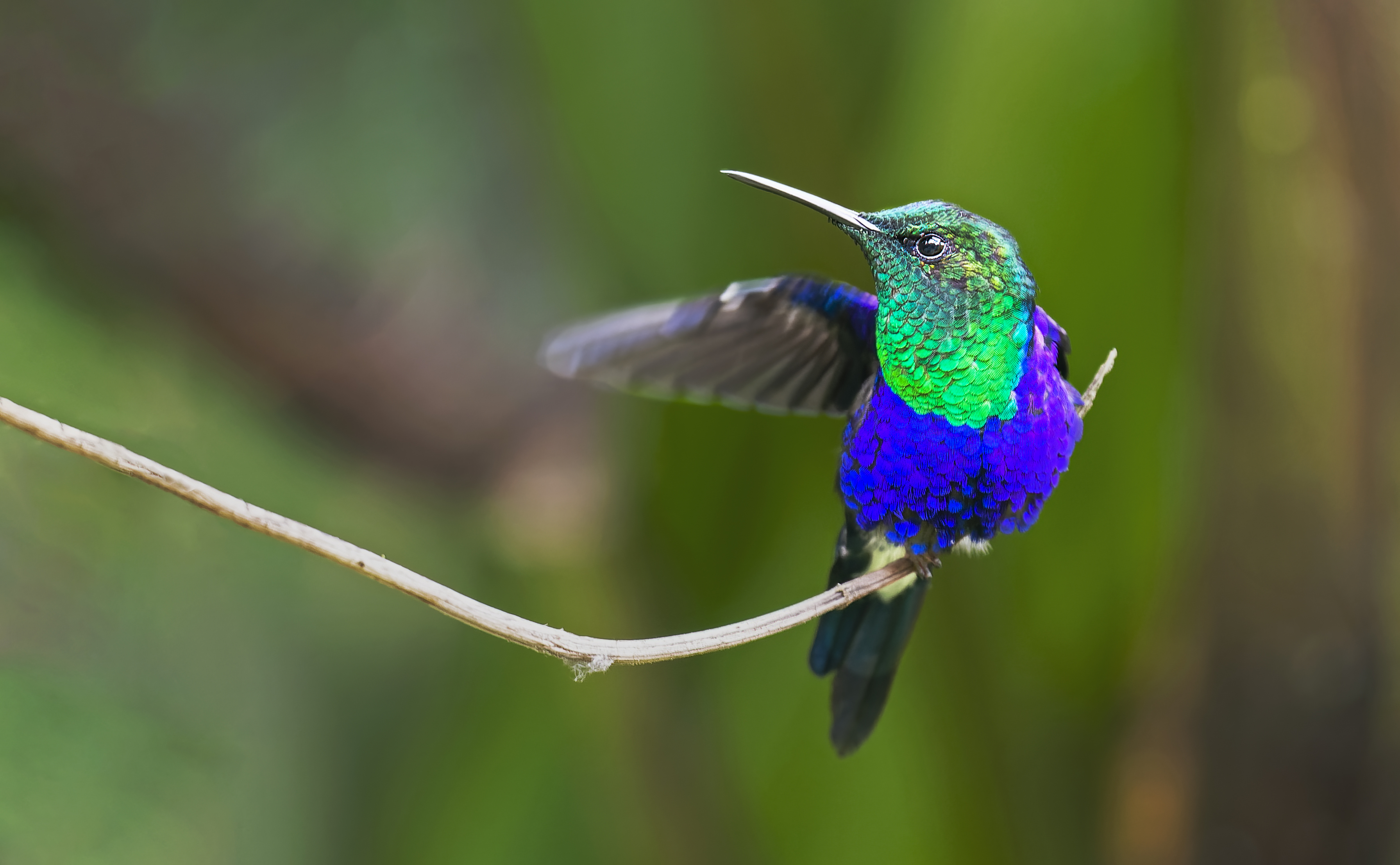
Thalurania colombica fannyi (Green-crowned Woodnymph)

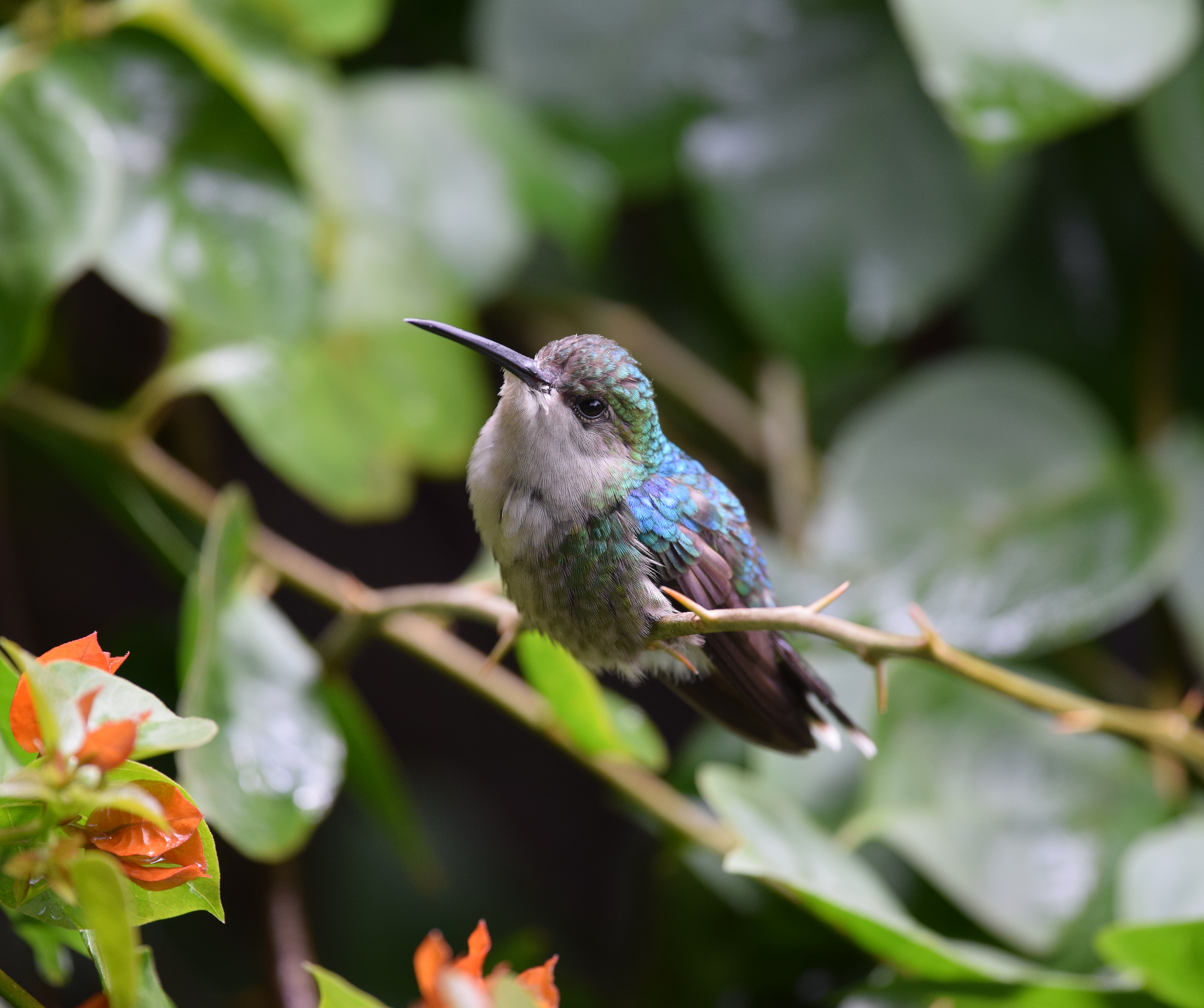
Female crowned woodnymph

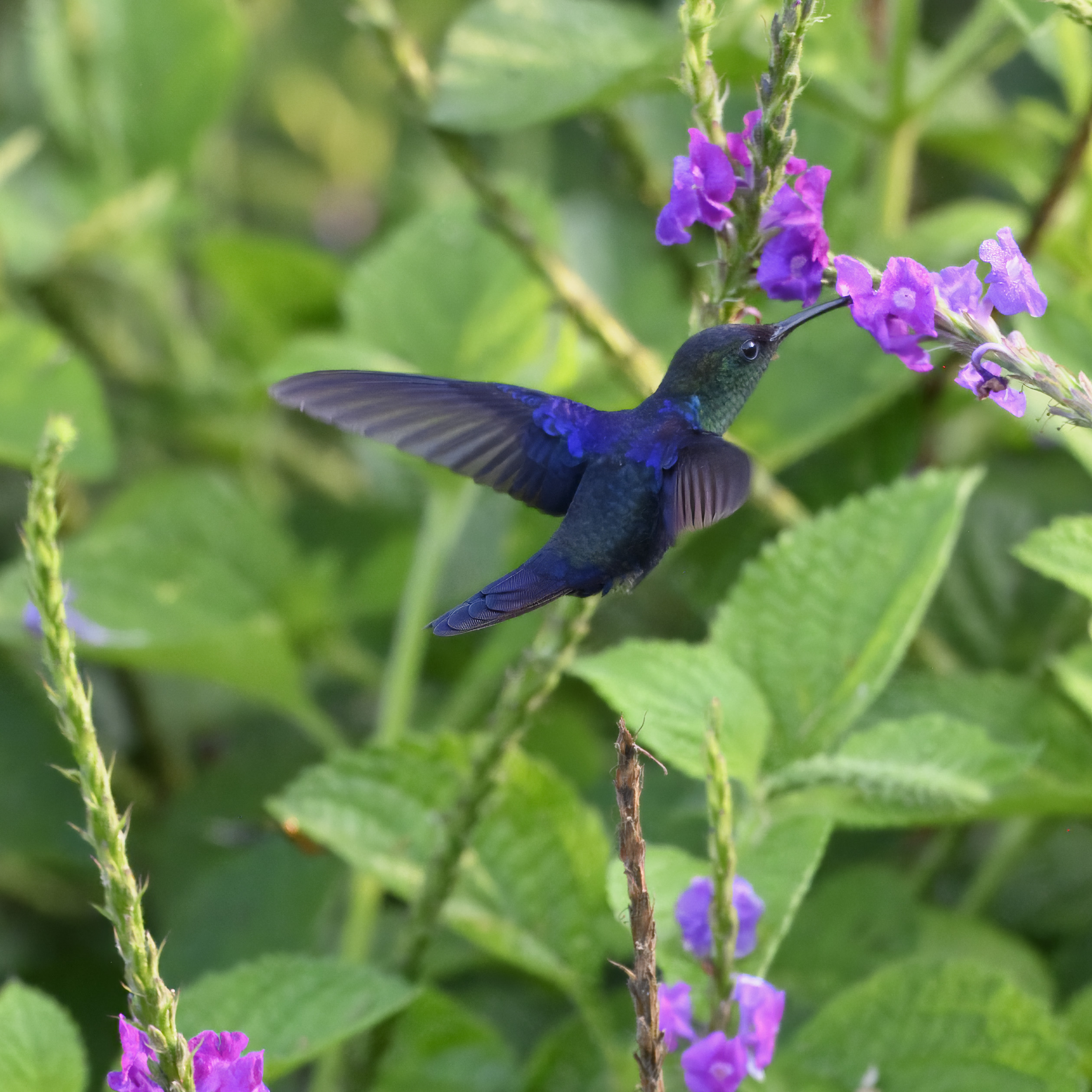
Crowned woodnymph

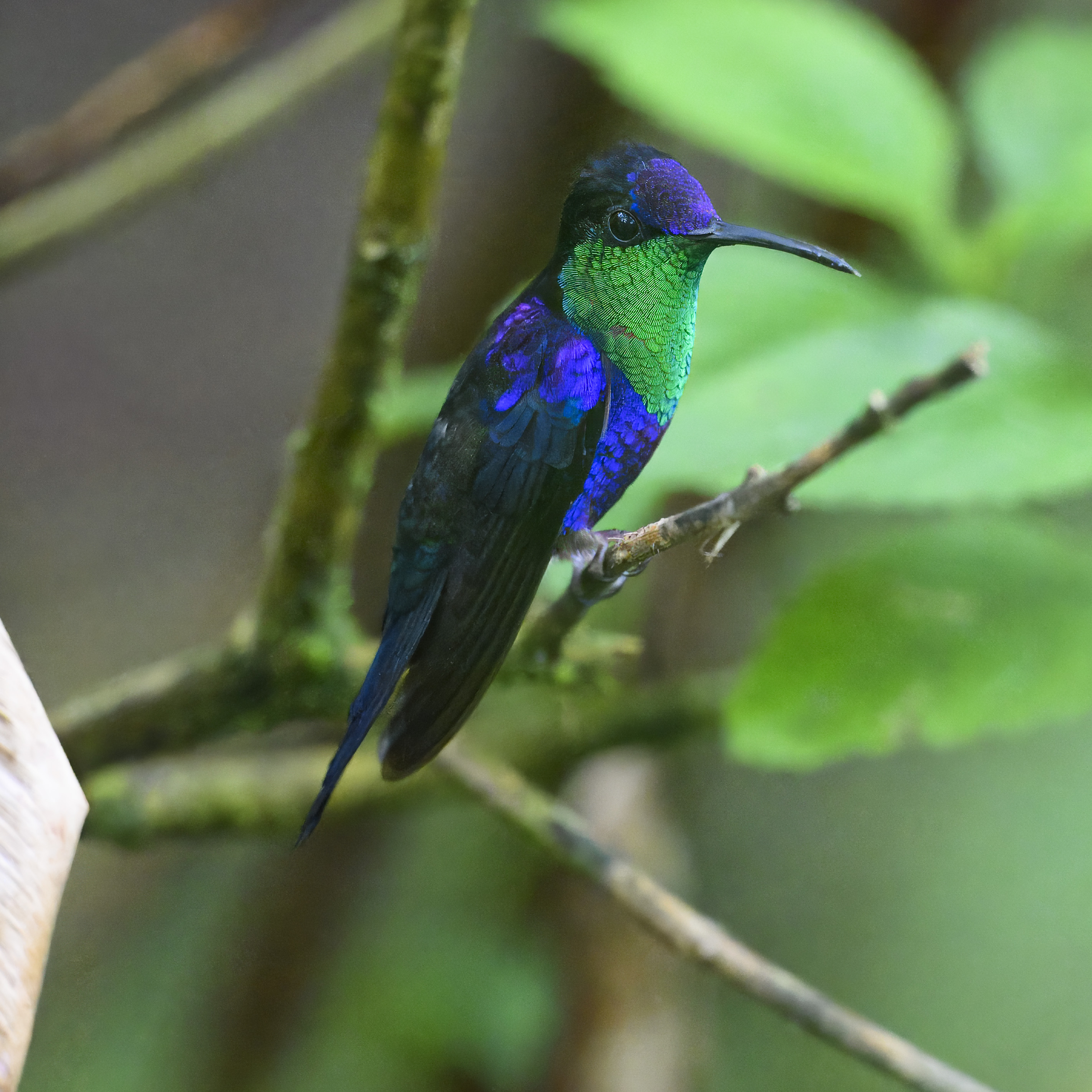

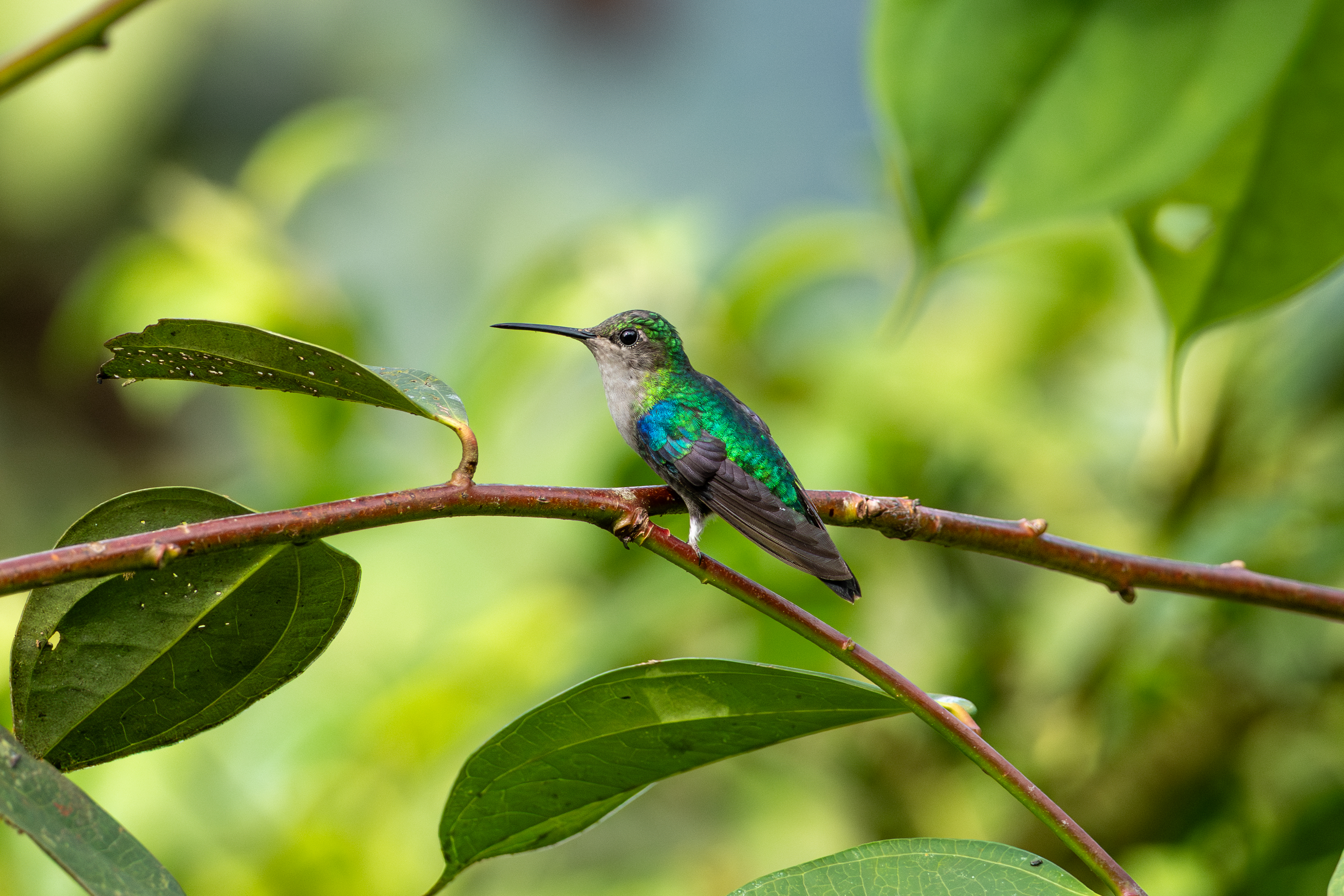
Female Crowned Woodnymph in Ecuador
