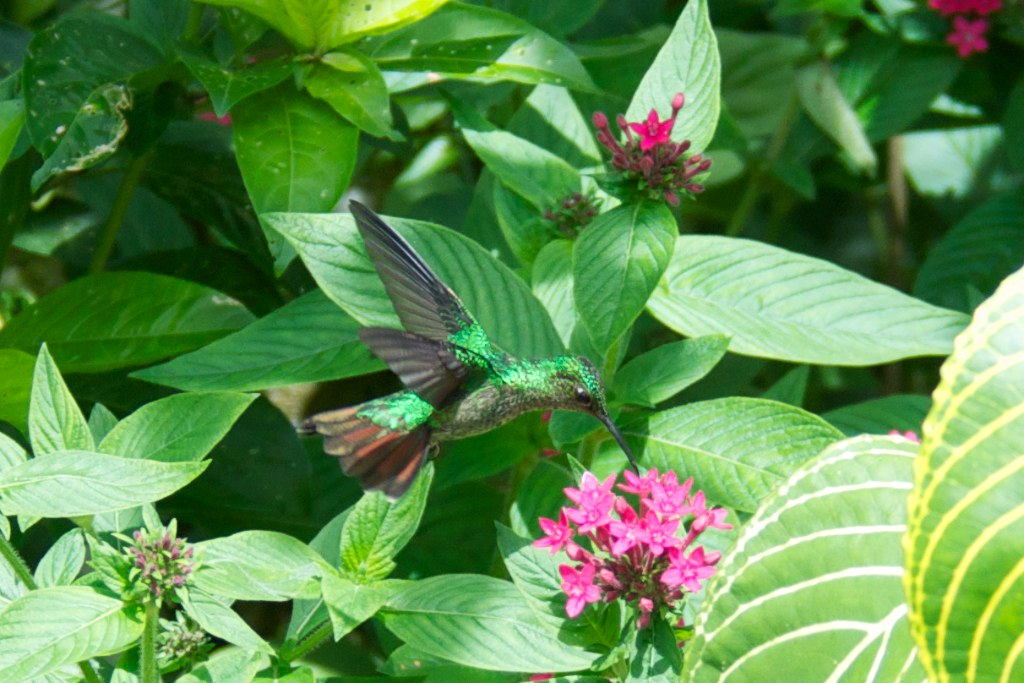

Conservation status
- Near Threatened (IUCN 3.1)
- CITES Appendix II (CITES)

Scientific classification
- Kingdom: Animalia
- Phylum: Chordata
- Class: Aves
- Clade: Strisores
- Order: Apodiformes
- Family: Trochilidae
- Genus: Goldmania
- Species: G. violiceps

Binomial name
- Goldmania violiceps Nelson, 1911

= Violet-capped hummingbird =

The violet-capped hummingbird (Goldmania violiceps) is a Near Threatened species of hummingbird in the "emeralds", tribe Trochilini of subfamily Trochilinae. It is found in Panama and far northwestern Colombia.

== Taxonomy and systematics ==
The violet-capped hummingbird is monotypic. It shares it genus with the Pirre hummingbird.

== Description ==
The violet-capped hummingbird is 8.5 to 9.5 cm (3.3 to 3.7 in) long. Males weigh 3.8 to 4.4 g (0.13 to 0.16 oz) and females 3.4 to 3.9 g (0.12 to 0.14 oz). Both sexes have a straight bill that is mostly black with a pink base to the mandible. The male's crown is iridescent violet-blue and most of the rest of the body is metallic green. Its tail is slightly forked and maroon with wide white edges to the feathers. The female has green upperparts and whitish underparts with gray spots on the throat and green ones along the side. Its tail feathers are maroon with white tips.

== Distribution and habitat ==
The violet-capped hummingbird is found in several unconnected mountainous areas in central and eastern Panama and extreme northwestern Colombia. It inhabits the edges and interior of humid forest between the elevations of 600 and 1,200 m (2,000 and 3,900 ft) and is most common at around 900 m (3,000 ft).

== Behavior ==
=== Movement ===
The violet-capped hummingbird is a year-round resident throughout its range.

=== Feeding ===
The violet-capped hummingbird forages for nectar in dense undergrowth, feeding mainly on low flowering shrubs like Salvia, Pachystachis, Palicourea and Psammisia.

=== Breeding ===
The violet-capped hummingbird's breeding season was for a time thought to span from December to March. Nests discovered in 2021 and 2022 suggest that the season spans from December to August. The nests were small cups made from lichen, fern fibers, and dry moss held together with spider web and lined with additional spider web. One was attached to the end of a fern frond about 1 m (3 ft) above the ground and the other to a shrub branch about 4 m (13 ft) above the ground. Both contained two white eggs. The female alone incubated the eggs. At the one nest later observed with a nestling the female provided all the care.

=== Vocalization ===
The violet-capped hummingbird's song is "a low, rapid chirping." Its call is "a series of irregularly repeated, very nasal and fairly low-pitched notes, 'kyek...kyek-kyek-kyek...kyek...'" that is typically given while hovering or feeding.

== Status ==
The IUCN originally assessed the violet-capped hummingbird as being of Least Concern but since 2017 has rated it Near Threatened. It has a small range; its population size is not known and is believed to be decreasing. "A slow amount of deforestation may be threatening this species, but much of this habitat has not been affected by man yet." It is considered fairly common to locally common.
