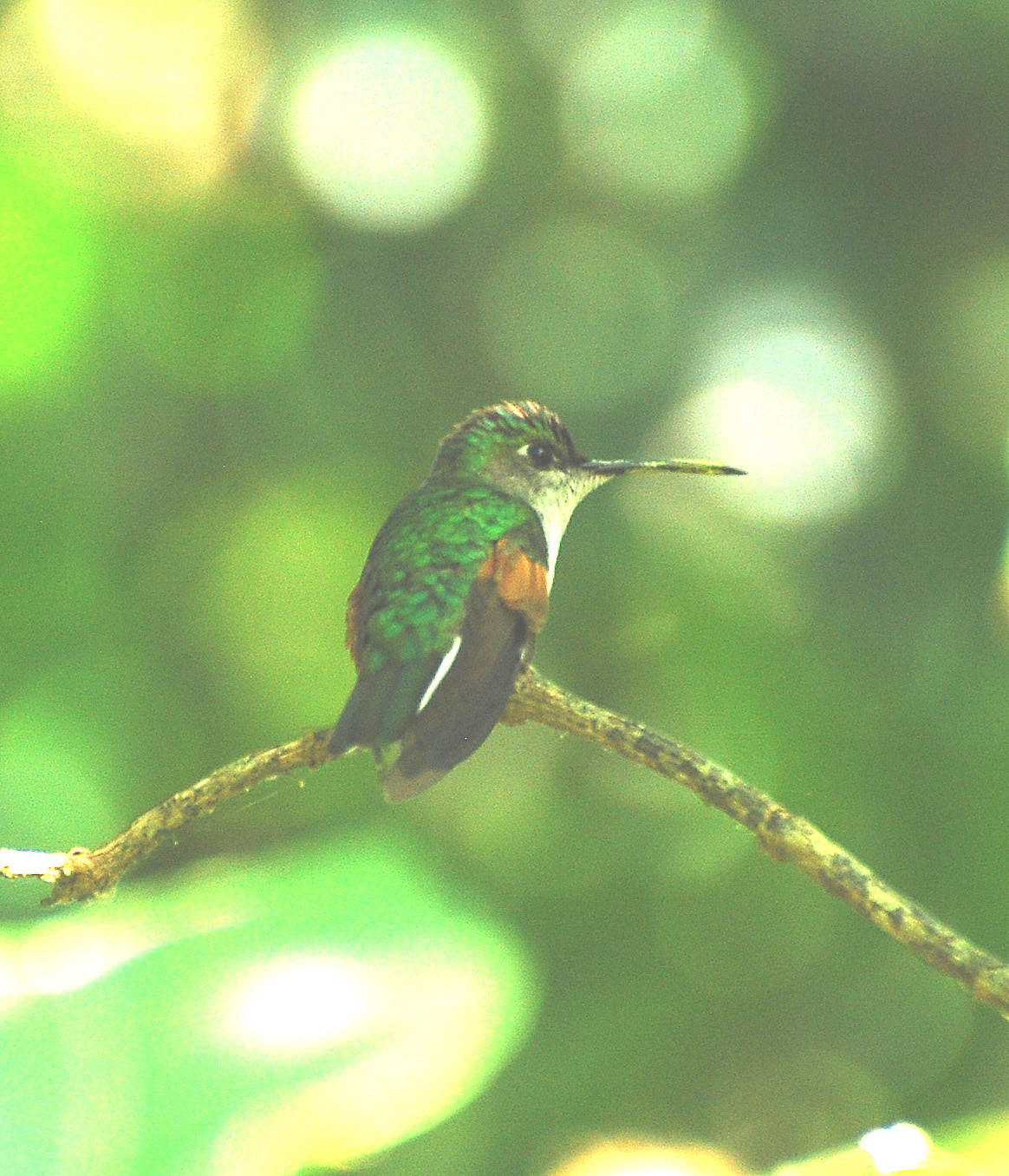
- Female

Conservation status
- Endangered (IUCN 3.1)
- CITES Appendix II (CITES)

Scientific classification
- Kingdom: Animalia
- Phylum: Chordata
- Class: Aves
- Clade: Strisores
- Order: Apodiformes
- Family: Trochilidae
- Genus: Eupherusa
- Species: E. cyanophrys

Binomial name
- Eupherusa cyanophrys Rowley & Orr, 1964

= Oaxaca hummingbird =

Species of hummingbird

The Oaxaca hummingbird or blue-capped hummingbird (Eupherusa cyanophrys) is an endangered species of hummingbird in the "emeralds", tribe Trochilini of subfamily Trochilinae. It is endemic to the Mexican state of Oaxaca.

== Taxonomy and systematics ==
The Oaxaca hummingbird is monotypic. At times some authors have treated it as a subspecies of the white-tailed hummingbird (E. poliocerca) and others have treated both of them as subspecies of the stripe-tailed hummingbird (E. eximia).

== Description ==
The Oaxaca hummingbird is 10 to 11 cm (3.9 to 4.3 in) long and weighs 4.1 to 5.4 g (0.14 to 0.19 oz). Both sexes have a straight black bill. Males have a violet-blue forehead, turquoise crown, and emerald green upperparts. Rufous secondaries show as a patch on the folded wing. Their central pair of tail feathers are green and the other four pairs whitish. Their underparts are glittering green with white undertail coverts. Females have green upperparts with a similar wing "patch" as the male's. Their central tail feathers are green and the others white with some dusky green. Their underparts are pale gray.

== Distribution and habitat ==
The Oaxaca hummingbird is found only on the Pacific slope of the Sierra Madre del Sur (also called Sierra de Miahuatlán) in southern Oaxaca. It inhabits the edges and interior of humid montane, semi-deciduous, and pine-oak forest. In elevation it ranges between 700 and 2,600 m (2,300 and 8,500 ft) and is most common below 1,800 m (5,900 ft).

== Behavior ==
=== Movement ===
The Oaxaca hummingbird's movements are not well known, but it might make seasonal elevational changes.

=== Feeding ===
The Oaxaca hummingbird forages for nectar at all levels of the forest from the understory to the canopy. Its diet has not been described in detail but it is known to feed at flowers of Inga, Lobelia, Malvaviscus, and Psittacanthus and some others. It is also assumed to feed on small arthropods like other hummingbirds.

=== Breeding ===
Little is known about the Oaxaca hummingbird's breeding phenology. Active nests have been found in May, October, and November. They were cups made of moss lined with plant down with lichen on the outside and placed between 1.2 and 5.4 m (4 and 20 ft) above the ground. The clutch size is two eggs; the incubation length and time to fledging are not known.

=== Vocalization ===
The Oaxaca hummingbird's song is "a high, rapid, warbling" described as similar to that of the white-tailed hummingbird but "jerkier, less hurried". Its calls are not well known but also appear similar to the white-tailed's "liquid to slightly buzzy, rolled chip".

== Status ==
The IUCN originally assessed the Oaxaca hummingbird as Threatened but since 1994 has rated it Endangered. It has a very small range and its estimated population of 600 to 1700 mature individuals is believed to be decreasing. A large part of the forest in its range has been destroyed and much of the rest is being cleared for agriculture. It is, however, considered fairly common to common where its habitat remains undisturbed.
