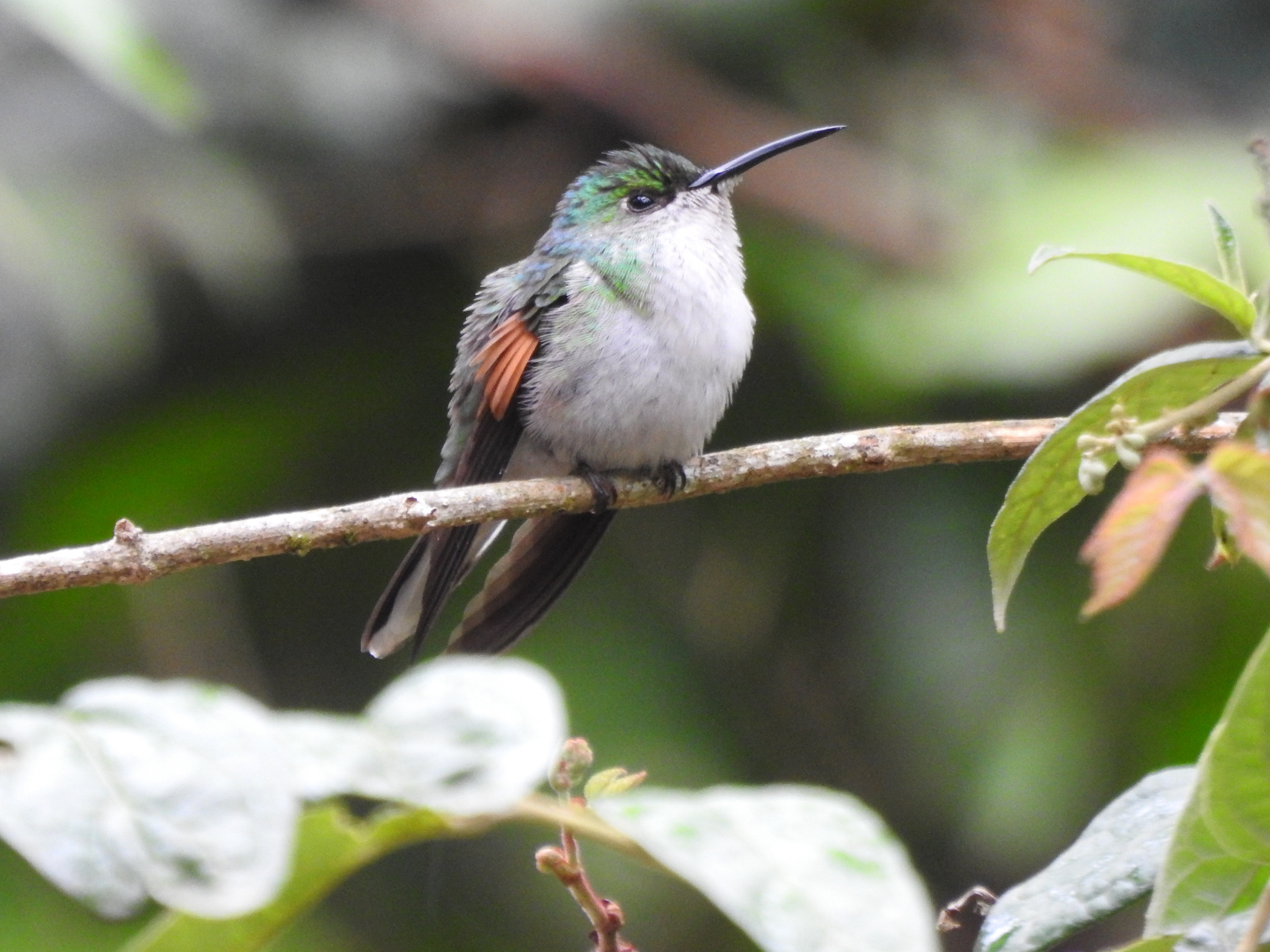

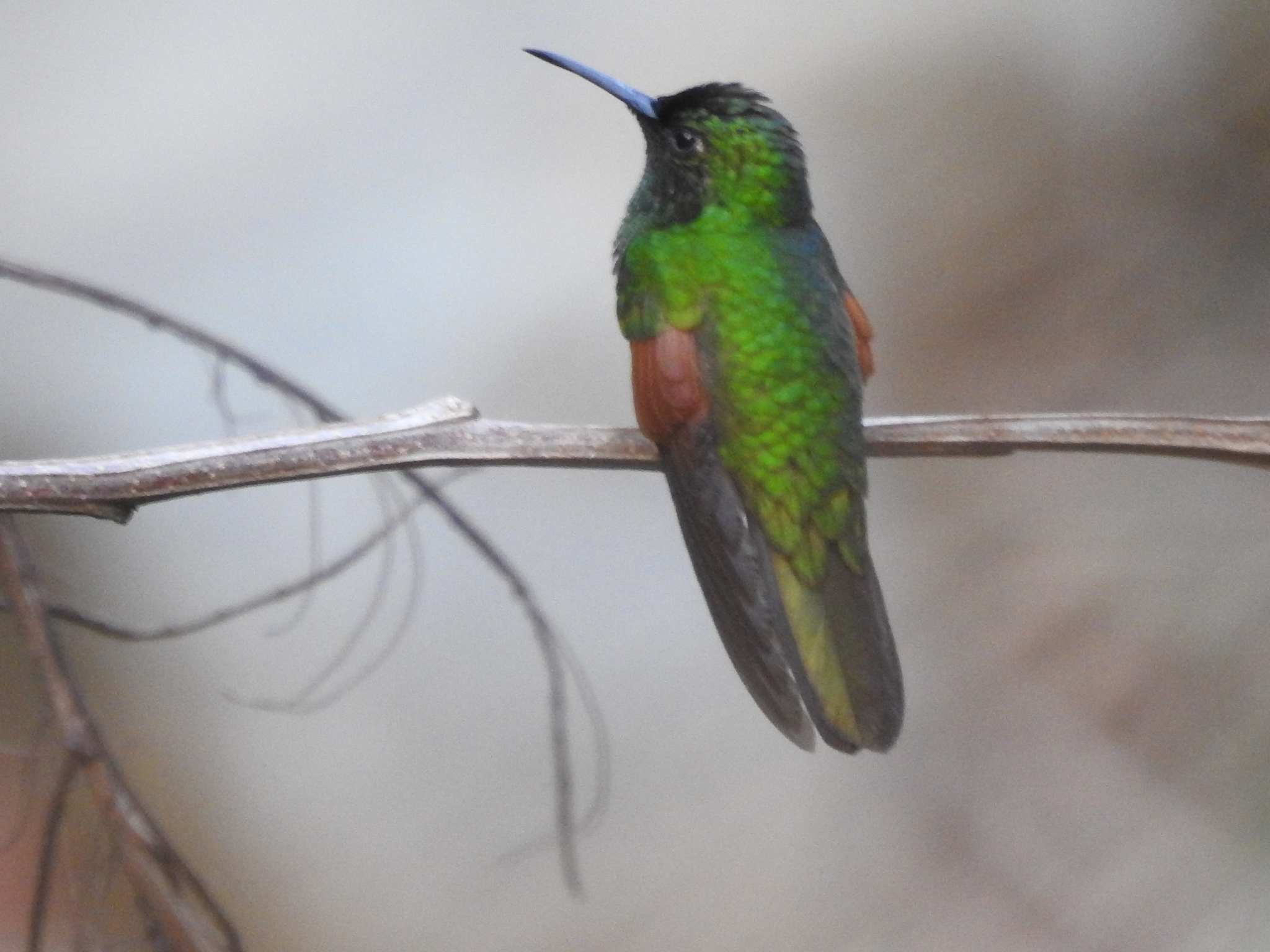

Conservation status
- Near Threatened (IUCN 3.1)
- CITES Appendix II

Scientific classification
- Kingdom: Animalia
- Phylum: Chordata
- Class: Aves
- Order: Apodiformes
- Family: Trochilidae
- Genus: Eupherusa
- Species: E. poliocerca

Binomial name
- Eupherusa poliocerca Elliot, 1871

= White-tailed hummingbird =

Species of hummingbird

The white-tailed hummingbird (Eupherusa poliocerca) is a Near Threatened species of hummingbird in the "emeralds", tribe Trochilini of subfamily Trochilinae. It is endemic to southwestern Mexico.

== Taxonomy and systematics ==
The white-tailed hummingbird is monotypic. However, in the past some authors have treated the Oaxaca hummingbird (E. cyanophrys) as a subspecies of it. Others have treated the white-tailed as a subspecies of the stripe-tailed hummingbird (E. eximia).

== Description ==
The white-tailed hummingbird is 10 to 11 cm (3.9 to 4.3 in) long and weighs 4.5 to 5 g (0.16 to 0.18 oz). Both sexes have a straight black bill. Males have bright metallic bronze green upperparts. Rufous primaries and secondaries show as a patch on the folded wing. Their central pair of tail feathers are metallic bronze green and the other four pairs grayish white. Their underparts are bright metallic yellowish green with white undertail coverts. Females have bright metallic golden green upperparts with a similar wing "patch" as the male's. Their central tail feathers are metallic golden green and the others white with some dusky or bronze green. Their underparts are grayish white with metallic green spots on the side and white to grayish white undertail coverts.

== Distribution and habitat ==
The white-tailed hummingbird is found on the Pacific slope of the southwestern Mexican state of Guerrero and slightly into western Oaxaca. It inhabits the edges and interior of humid montane, semi-deciduous, and pine-oak forest, and plantations. It apparently requires intact forest and is not found in shade coffee plantations. In elevation it ranges between 800 and 2,440 m (2,600 and 8,000 ft).

== Behavior ==
=== Movement ===
The white-tailed hummingbird's movements are not well known, but it might make seasonal elevational changes.

=== Feeding ===
The white-tailed hummingbird forages for nectar at all levels of the forest from the understory to the canopy. Its diet has not been described in detail but it is known to feed at flowers of Inga, Lobelia, Malvaviscus, and Psittacanthus and some others. It is also assumed to feed on small arthropods like other hummingbirds.

=== Breeding ===
The white-tailed hummingbird's breeding phenology is scarcely known. The timing of specimens in breeding condition suggest two breeding peaks, February to May and September to October. Its nest has not been described.

=== Vocalization ===
The white-tailed hummingbird's song has been described as "a high, rapid, slightly liquid to squeaky warbling". One call is "a liquid to slightly buzzy, rolled chip, often run into rattled trills". As of mid-2022 the Cornell Lab of Ornithology's Macaulay Library has very few recordings and xeno-canto has none.

== Status ==
The IUCN originally assessed the white-tailed hummingbird as Threatened, then in 1994 as Endangered, in 2000 as Vulnerable, and since 2021 as Near Threatened. It occurs patchily in its small range. Its estimated population of fewer than 15,000 mature individuals is believed to be decreasing. Some forest in its range has been destroyed and much of the rest is under threat of logging or clearing for agriculture. Mexican authorities consider it threatened.
