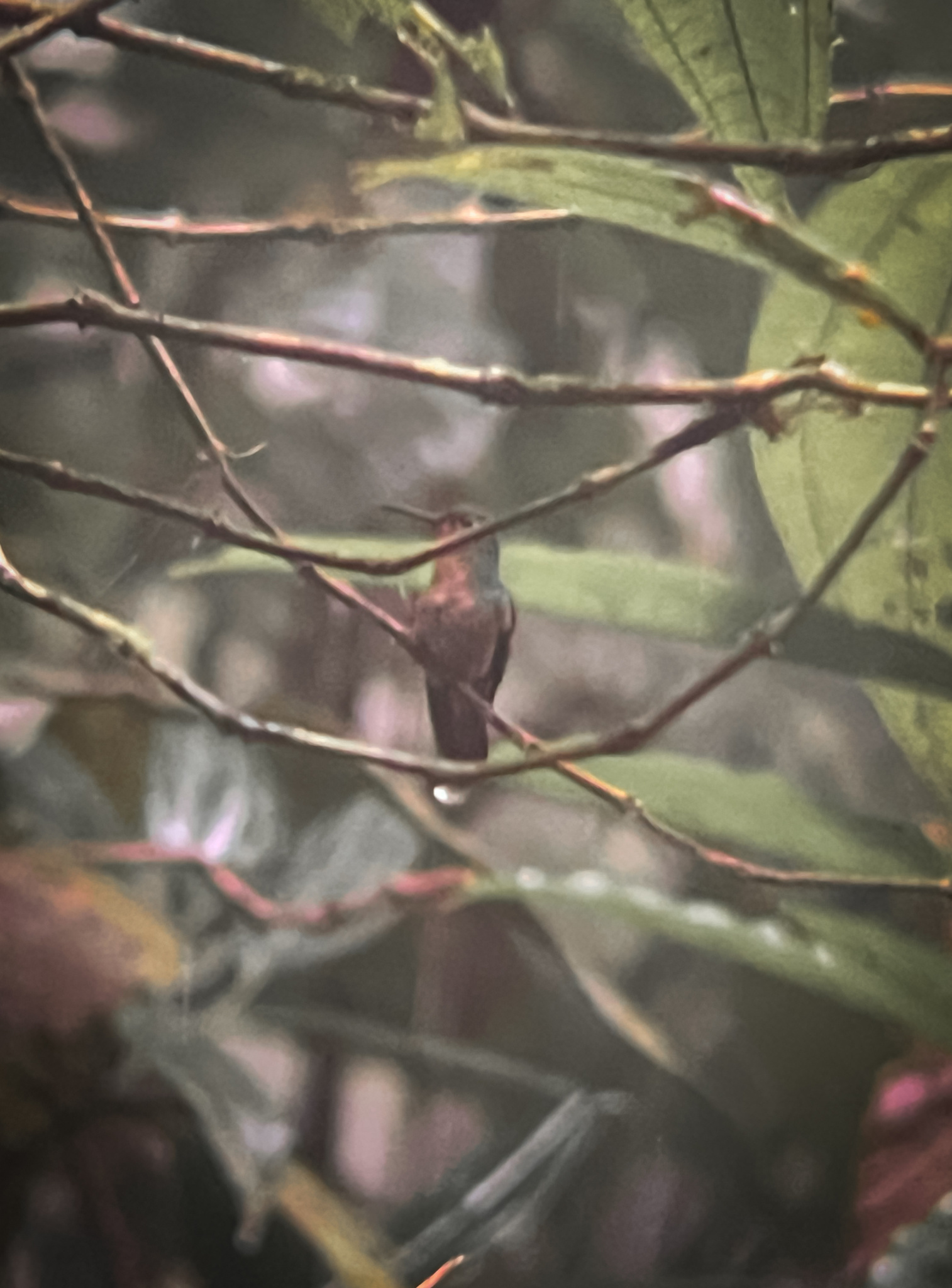

Conservation status
- Near Threatened (IUCN 3.1)
- CITES Appendix II

Scientific classification
- Kingdom: Animalia
- Phylum: Chordata
- Class: Aves
- Clade: Strisores
- Order: Apodiformes
- Family: Trochilidae
- Genus: Goldmania
- Species: G. bella

Binomial name
- Goldmania bella (Nelson, 1912)

Synonyms
- Goethalsia bella

= Pirre hummingbird =

The Pirre hummingbird (Goldmania bella), also somewhat misleadingly known as the rufous-cheeked hummingbird, is a Near Threatened species of hummingbird in the "emeralds", tribe Trochilini of subfamily Trochilinae. It is found in Panama and far northwestern Colombia.

== Taxonomy and systematics ==
The Pirre hummingbird was first described by Edward William Nelson in 1912 from specimens collected near Cana and the slopes of the Cerro Pirre in the Darién National Park in eastern Panama near the border with Colombia. Nelson coined the binomial name Goethalsia bella. A molecular phylogenetic study published in 2014 found that the Pirre hummingbird was closely related to the violet-capped hummingbird (Goldmania violiceps). Most taxonomic systems moved the species into Goldmania, which has priority. However, BirdLife International's Handbook of the Birds of the World retains it in Goethalsia.

The Pirre hummingbird is monotypic: No subspecies are recognised.

== Description ==
The Pirre hummingbird is 8.4 to 9.5 cm (3.3 to 3.7 in) long. Males weigh about 3.0 to 3.5 g (0.11 to 0.12 oz) and females 3.0 to 4.0 g (0.11 to 0.14 oz). Both sexes have a slightly decurved bill with a black maxilla and a black-tipped pink mandible. The male has a chestnut forehead and lores. Its crown, back, rump, and uppertail coverts are metallic green; the lower back and rump have a bronzy cast. Its central pair of tail feathers have bronze green bases and black tips and the rest are cinnamon buff with black tips. Its chin is cinnamon buff, the throat, breast, and belly shiny bluish green, and the undertail coverts white. Females have entirely green upperparts without the male's chestnut forehead. Their lores are chestnut and their underparts pale cinnamon buff.

== Distribution and habitat ==
The Pirre hummingbird is found on a few isolated ridges in Panama's eastern Darién Province and in adjacent Chocó Department in Colombia. It inhabits the understory of the edges and interior of humid montane forest at elevations between 600 and 1,650 m (2,000 and 5,400 ft).

== Behavior ==
=== Movement ===
The Pirre hummingbird's movements, if any, have not been documented.

=== Feeding ===
The Pirre hummingbird forages for nectar from near the ground to the middle levels of the forest. Its diet has not been described in detail but it has been observed feeding at Cephalus shrubs. In addition to nectar it is assumed to also feed on small arthropods like other hummingbirds.

=== Breeding ===
Nothing is known about the Pirre hummingbird's breeding phenology and its nest has not been described.

=== Vocalization ===
The Cornell Lab of Ornithology's Macaulay Library and xeno-canto have very few recordings of the Pirre hummingbird's vocalizations. It does make "a single sharp note repeated in a long series" while perched but its function is not known.

== Status ==
The IUCN has assessed the Pirre hummingbird as Near Threatened. It has a small range and occupies very few locations within it. "Much of the highland forest within this very restricted range remains relatively pristine because of its inaccessibility and formal protection." Its population size and trend are not known. Because it inhabits fairly high elevations, it is vulnerable to changes due to climate change. It is variously considered rare, uncommon, fairly common, and very common at different sites.
