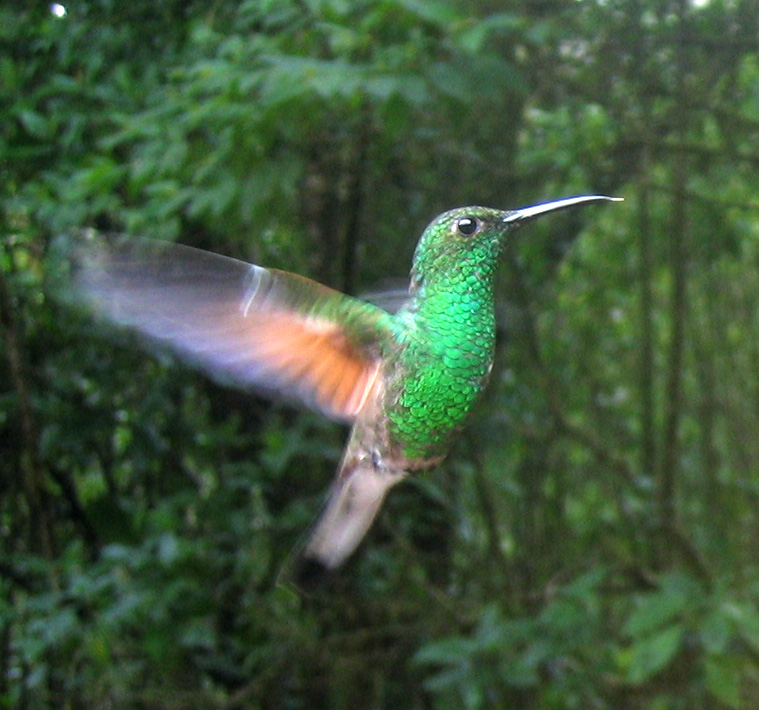

Conservation status
- Least Concern (IUCN 3.1)
- CITES Appendix II (CITES)

Scientific classification
- Kingdom: Animalia
- Phylum: Chordata
- Class: Aves
- Clade: Strisores
- Order: Apodiformes
- Family: Trochilidae
- Genus: Eupherusa
- Species: E. eximia

Binomial name
- Eupherusa eximia (Delattre, 1843)
- Range of E. eximia

= Stripe-tailed hummingbird =

The stripe-tailed hummingbird (Eupherusa eximia) is a species of hummingbird in the "emeralds", tribe Trochilini of subfamily Trochilinae. It is found from southeastern Mexico to Panama.

== Taxonomy and systematics ==
The stripe-tailed hummingbird has three subspecies, the nominate E. e. eximia, E. e. nelsoni, and E. e. egregia. Some authors have also treated the white-tailed hummingbird (E. poliocerca) and Oaxaca hummingbird (E. cyanophrys) as additional subspecies.

== Description ==
The stripe-tailed hummingbird is 9 to 10.5 cm (3.5 to 4.1 in) long and weighs an average of 4–4.5 g (0.14–0.16 oz). Both sexes of all subspecies have a straight black bill. The nominate male has bright metallic grass green upperparts that is more bronzy on the uppertail coverts. Cinnamon rufous secondaries show as a patch on the folded wing. Its three inner pairs of tail feathers are dark bronze green; the outer two pairs have black outer webs and white inner ones with black tips, giving the species its English name. Its underparts are bright metallic grass green with white undertail coverts. The female also has grass green upperparts; its underparts are brownish gray with metallic green spots on the sides. Its tail is similar to the male's with the addition of dusky to black tips on the inner feathers.

Males of subspecies E. e. nelsoni are larger than the nominate. Their underparts are more yellowish green, and the black tips of the outer tail feathers are less sharply defined. Males of E. e. egregia are also larger than the nominate. The black on the outer web of the two outermost pairs of tail feathers is limited to the tip. The female's outermost pair of tail feathers are usually entirely white.

== Distribution and habitat ==
Subspecies E. e. nelsoni of the stripe-tailed hummingbird is the northernmost; it is found in the eastern Mexican states of Veracruz and Oaxaca. The nominate E. e. eximia is found from Chiapas in extreme eastern Mexico south through southern Belize, Honduras, and El Salvador into central Nicaragua. Both are limited to the Caribbean slope of the highlands. Subspecies E. e. egregia is found on both the Caribbean and Pacific slopes in Costa Rica and western Panama.

The stripe-tailed hummingbird inhabits the edges and interior of humid montane, semi-deciduous, and pine-oak forest and also plantations. In elevation it ranges from near sea level to 1,800 m (5,900 ft) in Mexico, from 300 to 1,800 m (980 to 5,900 ft) in Honduras, and between 300 and 2,450 m (980 and 8,000 ft) in Costa Rica.

== Behavior ==
=== Movement ===
The stripe-tailed hummingbird makes seasonal elevational movements, breeding in the higher parts of its range and moving to the lower parts after breeding.

=== Feeding ===
The stripe-tailed hummingbird forages for nectar at all levels of the forest, but most often in the canopy. Both species forage lower at edges and in clearings, but only females are regular in the understory. Males often aggressively defend patches of flowers. It feeds on a wide variety of flowering plants and has been noted to favor Inga trees, Acanthaceae and Rubiaceae shrubs, epiphytes, and the flowers of Clusia, Besleria, and Salvia.

=== Breeding ===
The stripe-tailed hummingbird breeds between April and August in Mexico and September to April in Costa Rica; its breeding seasons in other parts of its range have not been defined. It makes a cup nest of plant down with lichens (especially red ones) on the outside, and typically places it 1 to 3 m (3 to 10 ft) above the ground near a stream. The clutch size is two eggs; the incubation period and time to fledging are not known.

=== Vocalization ===
The stripe-tailed hummingbird's song is "1-3 squeaky, sometimes metallic notes, then a low, dry, insectlike trill, then 1-3 more squeaks". Its calls include "a liquid, rattling trill", a "sharp, piercing peet or bzeet", and "a sharp buzz".

== Status ==
The IUCN has assessed the stripe-tailed hummingbird as being of Least Concern, though its population size and trend are not known. No immediate threats have been identified. It is considered fairly common to common in most of its large range. However, it is "potentially is vulnerable to habitat loss, especially in southern Mexico".
