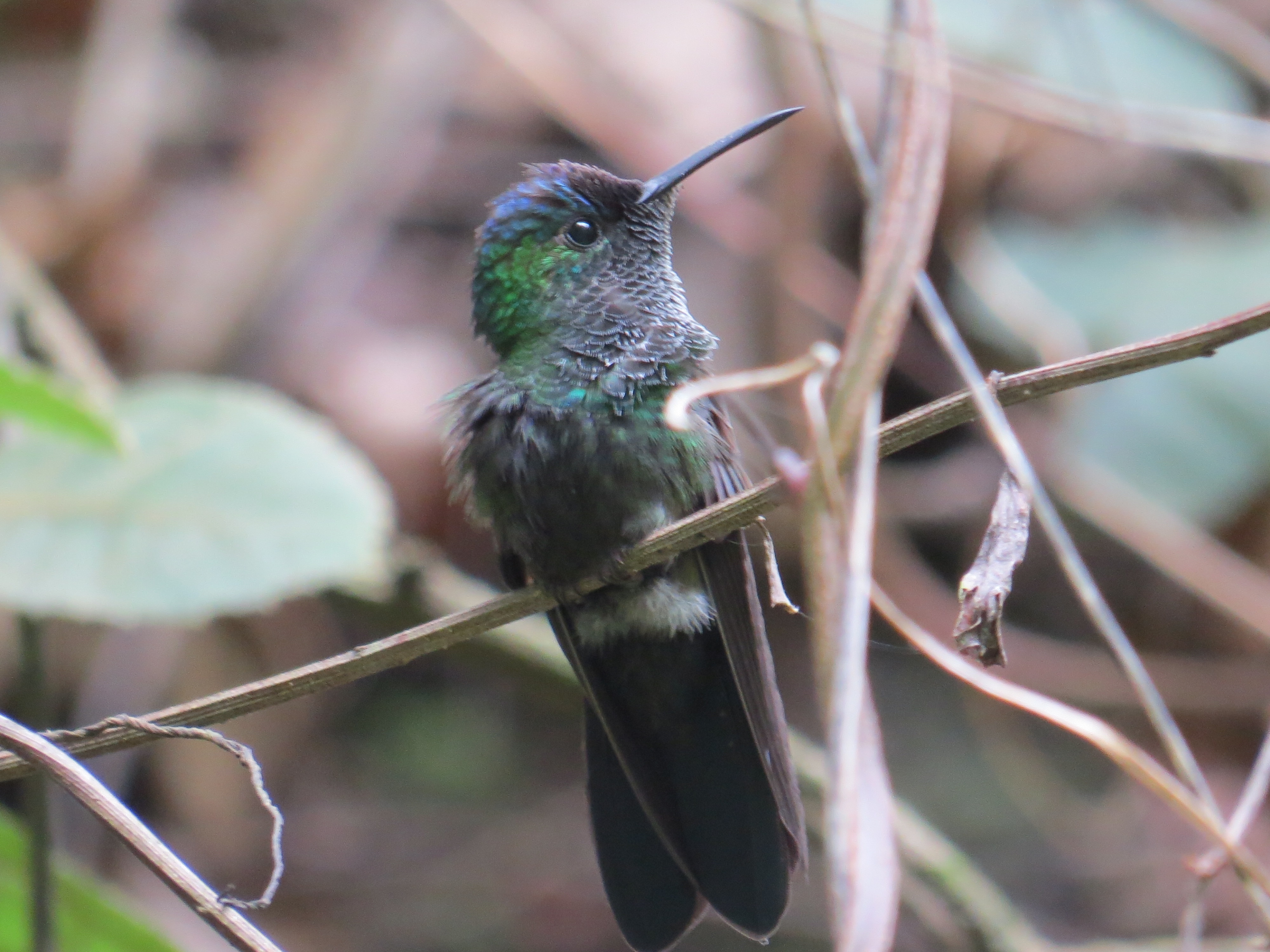

Conservation status
- Vulnerable (IUCN 3.1)
- CITES Appendix II

Scientific classification
- Kingdom: Animalia
- Phylum: Chordata
- Class: Aves
- Order: Apodiformes
- Family: Trochilidae
- Genus: Eupherusa
- Species: E. ridgwayi

Binomial name
- Eupherusa ridgwayi (Nelson, 1900)

= Mexican woodnymph =

Species of hummingbird

The Mexican woodnymph (Eupherusa ridgwayi) is a species of hummingbird in the family Trochilidae endemic to western Mexico. It lives in subtropical or tropical moist lowland/foothill forest and plantations, feeding on flower nectar and insects. Mexican woodnymphs are vulnerable, threatened by habitat loss through deforestation.

== Taxonomy ==
The Mexican woodnymph was formerly placed in the genus Thalurania that contains other species with "woodnymph" in their English names. A molecular phylogenetic study published in 2014 found that Thalurania was non-monophyletic and that the Mexican woodnymph is closely related to species in the genus Eupherusa. Based on this result the Mexican woodnymph is now placed in Eupherusa. The Mexican woodnymph is monotypic: there are no recognised subspecies.

== Description ==
Mexican woodnymphs are small birds, generally 9–10 centimetres (3.5–3.9 in) long. Females weigh around 3.5 grams (0.12 oz) and males weigh from 3.5 to 4.2 grams (0.12 to 0.15 oz). Males have a straight black bill, mostly green body, a dull green chest, a blue-black forked tail, and an indigo crown. Females are similar, mostly green with darker green tail and wings, a light gray chest. They lack the characteristic indigo crown, instead have a white spot behind their eyes and green disks on the sides of their chest.

One known vocalization consists of an irregular series of 2–4 quick notes. Their call has been described as a "liquid rattle".

== Distribution and habitat ==
Mexican woodnymphs live exclusively in the northern mountains of western Mexico, with habitat in the states of Nayarit, Jalisco and Colima. They are not migratory and spend the whole year in their small range. They are the northernmost species of their genus.

Although there is little known of the specific habitat requirements for Mexican woodnymphs, we are aware that they reside in humid forests, canyons and foothills at elevations of 250–1,200 metres (820–3,940 ft). They can be found at the forest and open woodland, and may inhabit some coffee plantations.

== Behavior ==
=== Breeding ===
Mexican woodnymphs breed in February and March. They are sexually dimorphic, and it is believed that male hummingbirds are sexually selected for based on their feather arrangement and coloring, resulting in a wide range of colors and looks.

=== Food and feeding ===
Mexican woodnymphs are nectivorous and insectivorous. They feed primarily on flower nectar from a variety of flowering plants, including: Rubiaceae, Zingiberaceae and epiphytes. They also eat arthropods by catching them in the air or eating them off vegetation.

== Conservation status ==
Mexican woodnymphs are listed as vulnerable due to habitat loss. As evident from their restricted range, they are dependent on the forest health of western Mexico, where deforestation is threatening the habitat. Unfortunately, since there is little information on their habitat needs and natural history, there is insufficient data on how to protect this species.
