= Streptomyces bauhiniae =

Scientific classification
- Domain: Bacteria
- Kingdom: Bacillati
- Phylum: Actinomycetota
- Class: Actinomycetia
- Order: Streptomycetales
- Family: Streptomycetaceae
- Genus: Streptomyces
- Species: S. bauhiniae

Binomial name
- Streptomyces bauhiniae Kanchanasin et al. 2020

Type strain
- Bv016

Species of bacterium

Streptomyces bauhiniae is a bacterium species from the genus of Streptomyces which has been isolated from the bark of the tree Bauhinia variegata from Thailand.

== See also ==
- List of Streptomyces species
