= Orchid tree =

Orchid tree is a common name for several tree species, including:

In the genus Bauhinia:

- Bauhinia blakeana
- Bauhinia forficata
- Bauhinia monandra
- Bauhinia purpurea
- Bauhinia variegata

In other genera:

- Amherstia nobilis
- Magnolia champaca, yellow jade orchid tree
- Monodora tenuifolia
