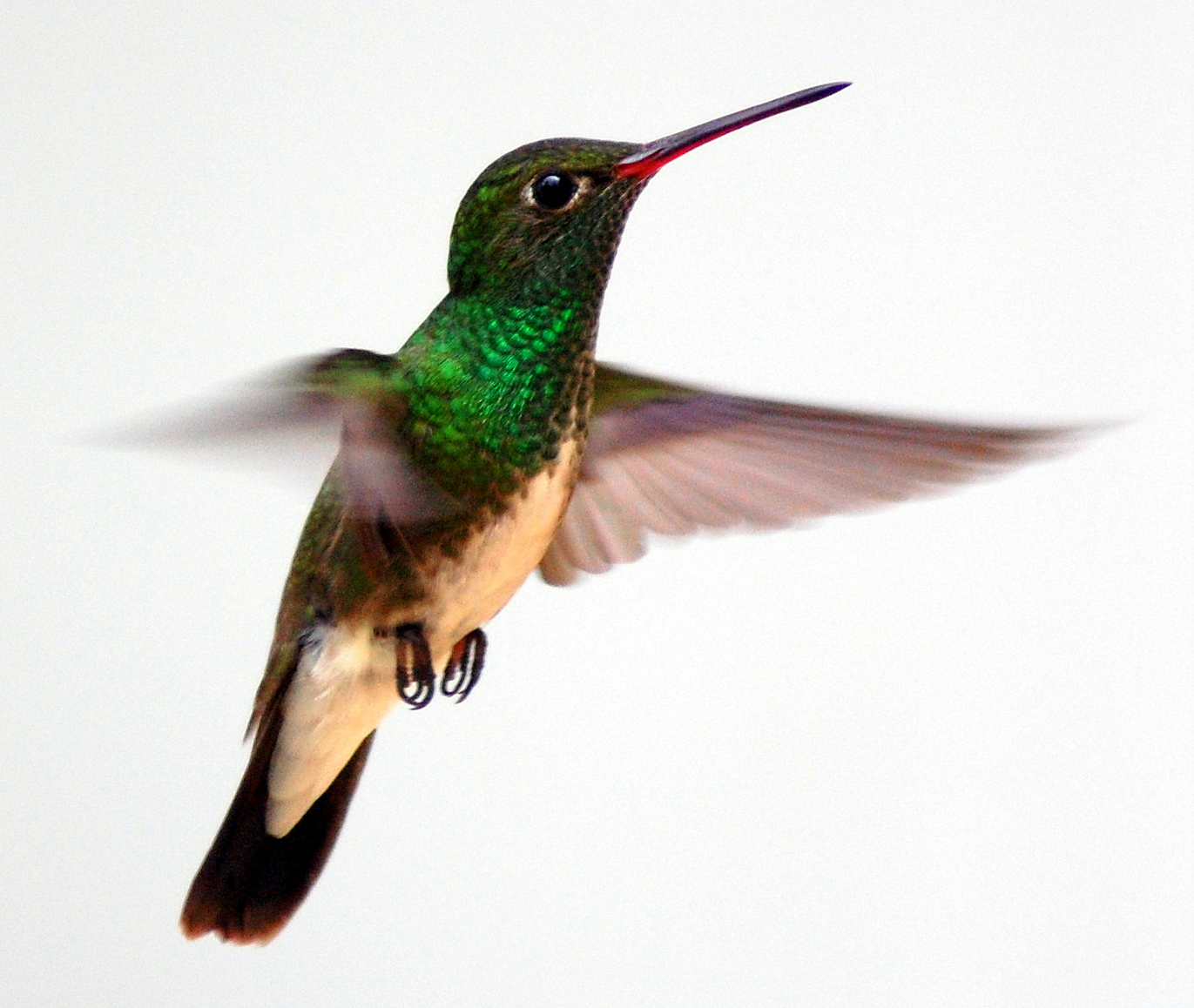
- Glittering-throated emerald

Conservation status
- Least Concern (IUCN 3.1)
- CITES Appendix II

Scientific classification
- Kingdom: Animalia
- Phylum: Chordata
- Class: Aves
- Clade: Strisores
- Order: Apodiformes
- Family: Trochilidae
- Genus: Chionomesa
- Species: C. fimbriata

Binomial name
- Chionomesa fimbriata (Gmelin, JF, 1788)

Synonyms
- Polyerata fimbriata; Agyrtria fimbriata; Amazilia fimbriata

= Glittering-throated emerald =

Species of hummingbird

The glittering-throated emerald (Chionomesa fimbriata) is a species of hummingbird in the "emeralds", tribe Trochilini of subfamily Trochilinae. It is found in Bolivia, Brazil, Colombia, Ecuador, the Guianas, Peru, Trinidad and Venezuela.

== Taxonomy and systematics ==
The glittering-throated emerald was formally described in 1788 by the German naturalist Johann Friedrich Gmelin in his revised and expanded edition of Carl Linnaeus's Systema Naturae. He placed it with all the other hummingbirds in the genus Trochilus and coined the binomial name Trochilus fimbriatus. Gmelin based his description on "L'Oiseau-mouche à gorge tachetée de Cayenne" that had been described and illustrated by the French ornithologist Mathurin Jacques Brisson in 1760, and by the French naturalist Georges-Louis Leclerc, Comte de Buffon in 1779.

This species was formerly placed in the genus Amazilia. A molecular phylogenetic study published in 2014 found that Amazilia was polyphyletic. In the revised classification to create monophyletic genera, the glittering-throated emerald and the sapphire-spangled emerald (Chionomesa lactea) were moved by most taxonomic systems to the resurrected genus Chionomesa that had been introduced in 1921 by the French naturalist Eugène Simon. However, BirdLife International's Handbook of the Birds of the World retains it in Amazilia.

The genus name Chionomesa combines the Ancient Greek khiōn meaning "snow" with mesos meaning "middle". The specific epithet fimbriata is from the Latin fimbriatus meaning "fringed".

Seven subspecies of glittering-throated emerald are recognized:

- C. f. elegantissima (Todd, 1942)
- C. f. fimbriata (Gmelin, J.F., 1788)
- C. f. apicalis (Gould, 1861)
- C. f. fluviatilis (Gould, 1861)
- C. f. laeta (Hartert, E., 1900)
- C. f. nigricauda (Elliot, D.G., 1878)
- C. f. tephrocephala (Vieillot, 1818)

Subspecies C. f. apicalis, C. f. fluviatilis, C. f. nigricauda, and C. f. tephrocephala have at times been treated as individual species.

== Description ==
The glittering-throated emerald is 8 to 12 cm (3.1 to 4.7 in) long and weighs 3.5 to 6.2 g (0.12 to 0.22 oz). Both sexes have a straight bill with a blackish maxilla and a pinkish mandible with a dark tip; its length varies among the subspecies. Adult males of the nominate subspecies C. f. fimbriata have golden- to bronze-green upperparts and a dark bronze-green to blackish bronze tail. Their throat and most of their breast are glittering golden-green. The center of their lower breast and their belly are white and their undertail coverts white with brownish centers. Adult females are similar to the male with the addition of white bars near the end of their throat feathers and greenish-gray tips on their outermost tail feathers. Juveniles resemble the adult female but with a more grayish-brown breast.

Subspecies C. f. elegantissima has coppery to purplish uppertail coverts. C. f. apicalis and C. f. fluviatilis have significantly longer bills than the nominate. C. f. fluviatilis also has a turquoise to bluish sheen on its throat, a characteristic shared with C. f. laeta. Subspecies C. f. nigricauda and C. f. tephrocephala have completely white undertail coverts and greenish-black to bluish black tails. C. f. tephrocephala is slightly heavier than the nominate and also significantly larger in all dimensions.

== Distribution and habitat ==
The subspecies of glittering-throated emerald are found thus:

- C. f. elegantissima, northern and western Venezuela and adjoining extreme northeastern Colombia
- C. f. fimbriata, from the Orinoco Basin of northeastern Venezuela through the Guianas and in northern Brazil north of the Amazon
- C. f. apicalis, Colombia east of the Andes
- C. f. fluviatilis, southeastern Colombia and eastern Ecuador
- C. f. laeta, northeastern Peru's departments of Amazonas, Loreto, San Martín, and Ucayali and possibly western Brazil
- C. f. nigricauda, eastern Bolivia and central and eastern Brazil south of the Amazon
- C. f. tephrocephala, coastal southeastern Brazil from Espírito Santo south to Rio Grande do Sul

The glittering-throated emerald inhabits a wide variety of semi-open to open landscapes, shunning the interior of dense forest. It is found in less dense dry and humid forest, gallery forest, secondary forest, open woodland, savanna, scrublands, caatinga, plantations, and gardens. C. f. tephrocephala is also found in mangroves.

== Behavior ==
=== Movement ===
Subspecies C. f. tephrocephala of the glittering-throated emerald is known to migrate north and south along the coast. The other subspecies are thought to make local movements but data are lacking.

=== Feeding ===
The glittering-throated emerald forages for nectar at a very large variety of flowering herbs, bushes, vines, and trees. Many species of at least 10 families are known sources. It forages by trap-lining, visiting a circuit of flowers, and seldom feeds higher than the lower strata of trees. In addition to nectar it feeds on small insects.

=== Breeding ===
The glittering-throated emerald's breeding seasons vary geographically, for instance in August and September in Guyana and northeastern Brazil, from November to February in central Brazil, and from November to April in eastern Brazil. It builds a cup nest of plant fibers bound with spiderweb with lichen on the outside. It is typically placed between 1 and 4 m (3 and 10 ft) above the ground but sometimes as high as 8 m (30 ft). The female incubates the clutch of two eggs for 14 to 17 days and fledging usually occurs between 18 and 22 days after hatch. Two broods per year are common.

=== Vocalization ===
The glittering-throated emerald's song is "a continuously repeated, single, high-pitched buzzy note, 'tzee...tzee...tzee...'" that is usually given at dawn. It makes "a repeated high thin 'tsee…tsi-tsi-tsitsitsi'" or "tslee-tslee-tslee-tslee" in flight and during agonistic encounters. Its calls include "high-pitched 'tsee' notes and soft chatters".

== Status ==
The IUCN has assessed the glittering-throated emerald as being of Least Concern. It has a very large range, but its population size and trend are not known. No immediate threats have been identified. It is considered common to very common in much of its range, especially in the north and east. The western populations are not as well known. C. f. tephrocephala is locally common but generally uncommon.
