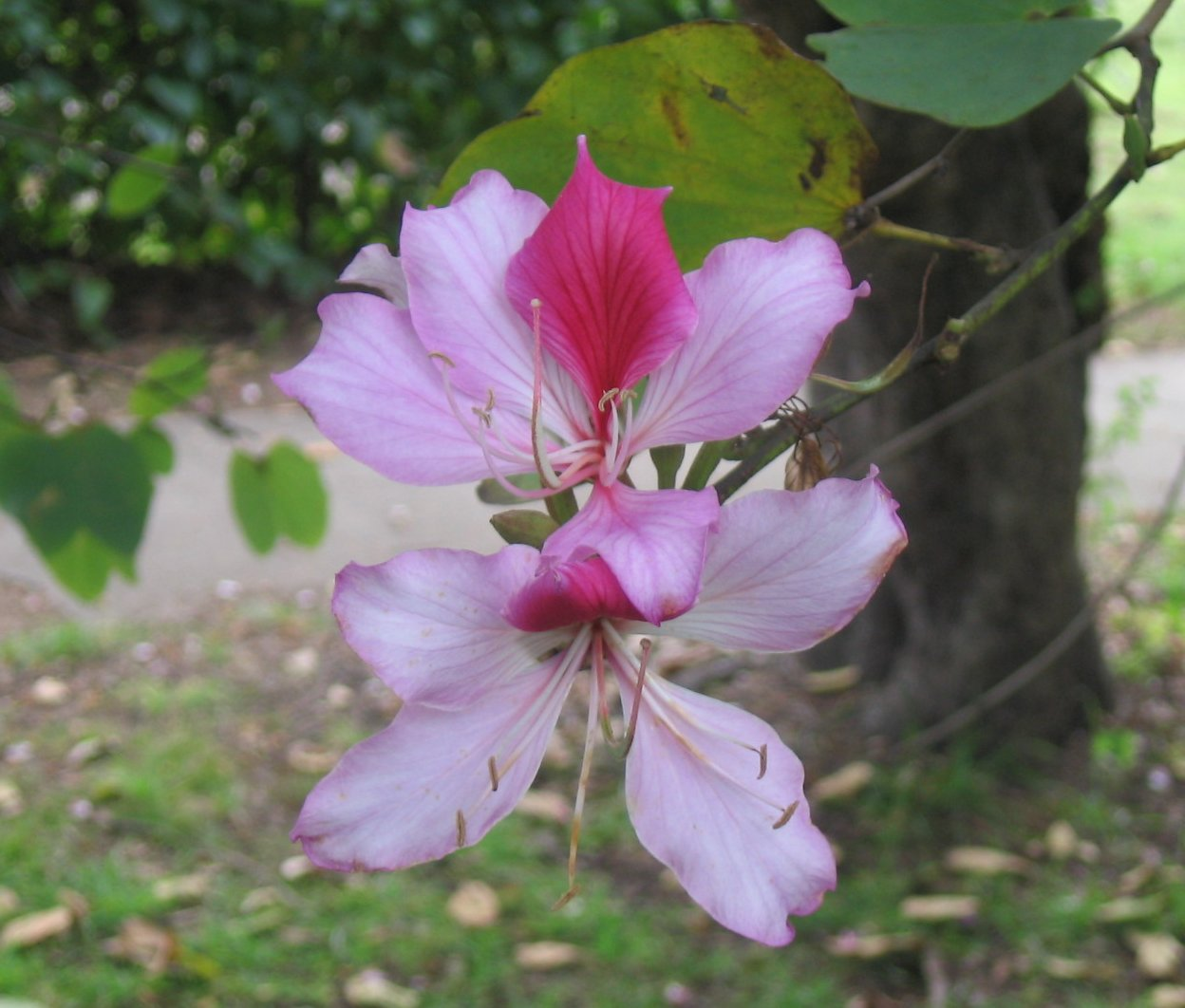
- Flowers

Scientific classification
- Kingdom: Plantae
- Clade: Tracheophytes
- Clade: Angiosperms
- Clade: Eudicots
- Clade: Rosids
- Order: Fabales
- Family: Fabaceae
- Genus: Bauhinia
- Species: B. variegata

Binomial name
- Bauhinia variegata (L.) Benth.

Synonyms
- Bauhinia chinensis (DC.) Vogel; Bauhinia decora Uribe; Bauhinia variegata var. candida Voigt; Bauhinia variegata var. chinensis DC.; Phanera variegata (L.) Benth.

= Bauhinia variegata =

Species of plant

Bauhinia variegata is a species of flowering plant in the legume family, Fabaceae. It is native to an area from China through Southeast Asia to the Indian subcontinent. Common names include orchid tree (though not belonging to the family Orchidaceae) and mountain ebony.

== Description ==
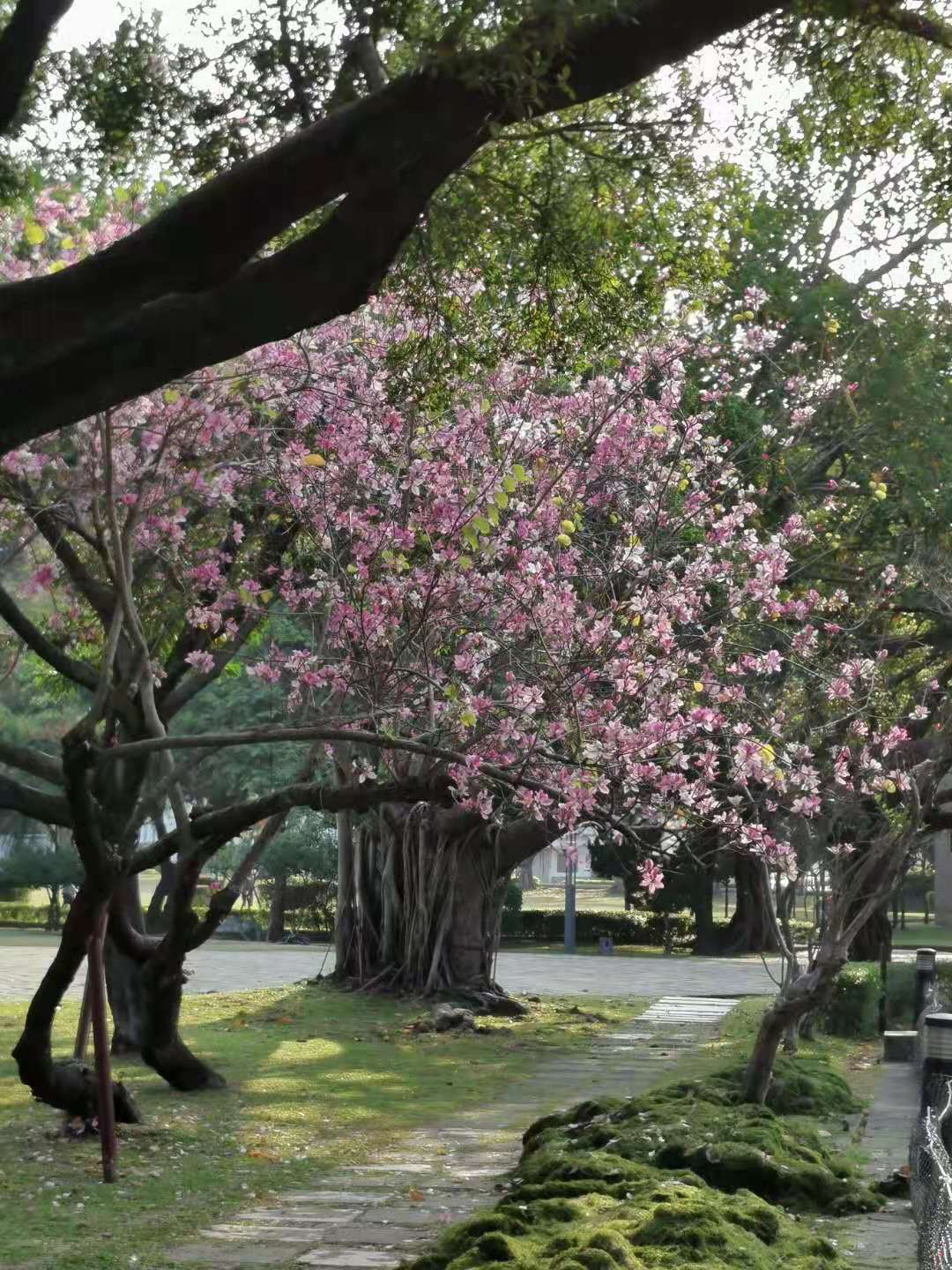
Almost no leaves on the tree during flowering. B. purpurea and B. blakeana, which are often confused with B. variegata, are leafy during flowering.

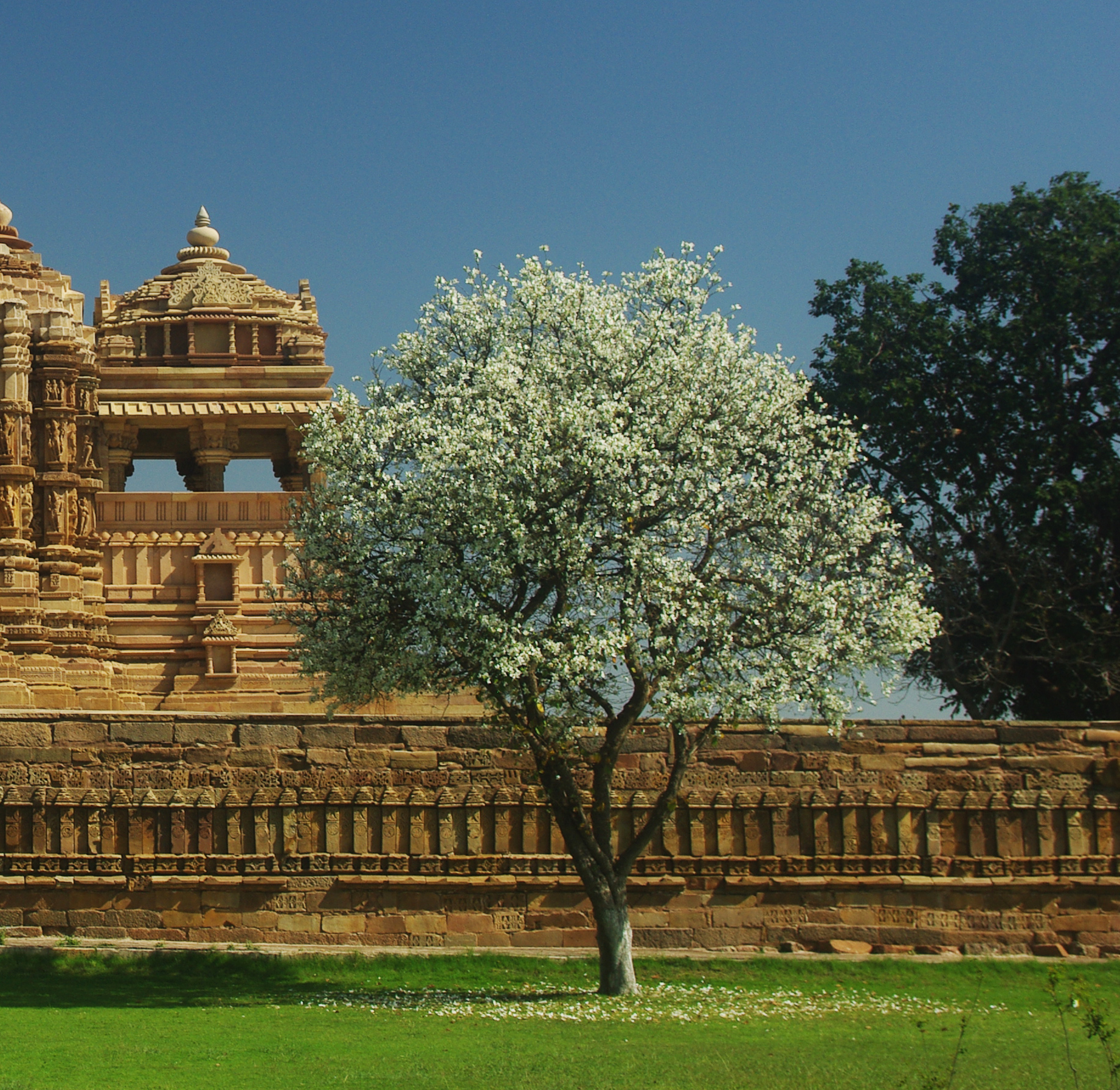
Bauhinia variegata "Var candida" (white flowering bauhinia), India

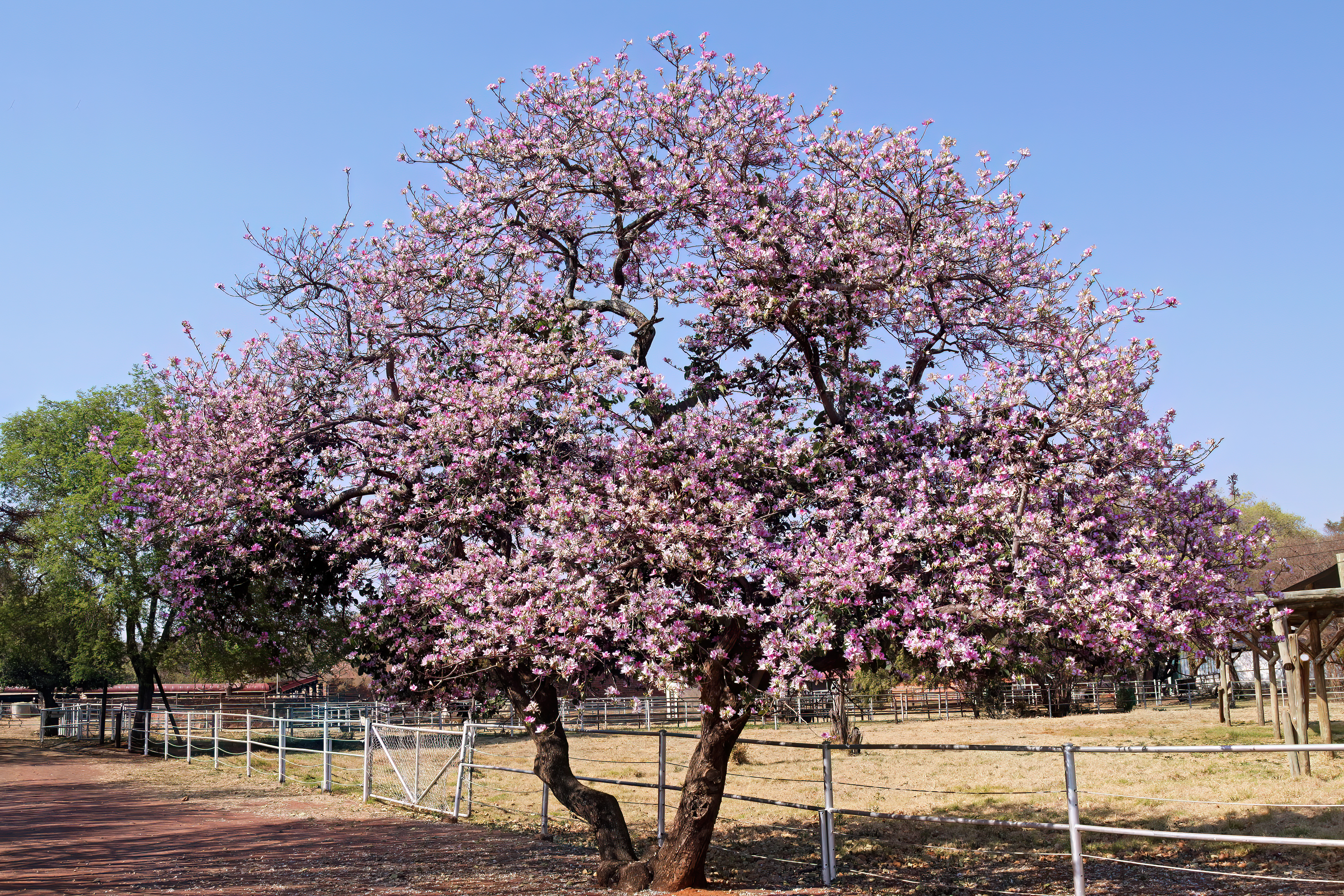
Bauhinia variegata var. variegata, South Africa

Bauhinia variegata is a small to medium-sized tree growing to 15 metres (49 ft) tall and 50 centimetres (20 in) in diameter, deciduous in the dry season. The leaves are 15–20 centimetres (5.9–7.9 in) obcordate shaped, long and broad, rounded, and bilobed at the base and apex. The flowers are conspicuous, bright pink or white, 5–7 centimetres (2.0–2.8 in) diameter, with five petals. Pollens are elongated, approximately 75 microns in length.

The fruit is a seedpod 20–30 centimetres (7.9–11.8 in) long, containing 10–15 seeds each. The seedpod dries completely on the tree, and when mature begins to twist into a helix or corkscrew shape, (see below), ultimately exploding open—with a very audible "clack"—to deliver its seeds into the environs.

The anatomy of the stem was studied by taking transverse section. Periderm and cortex were seen distinctly. Secondary phloem was wide and continuous cylindrical, it consisted of thin and narrow straight rays, three or four cylinders of discontinuous masses of fibres and randomly distributed sieve elements. Secondary xylem was diffuse porous and it included vessels, fibres, xylem rays and xylem parenchyma. Xylem fibres had thick lignified walls or some had gelatinous walls. Xylem parenchyma cells were abundant in the xylem. Xylem rays were one cell wide; they were straight and consisted of radially elongated thick walled lignified walls. Calcium-oxalate crystals are predominantly prismatic crystals and druses type. Powder microscopical examination showed presence of fibres, parenchymatous cells, periderm and vessel elements. Histochemical analysis of stem showed presence of protein, tannin, lignin and cellulose.

The anatomy of the root was studied by taking transverse section. Secondary phloem and secondary xylem were seen distinctly. Secondary phloem had fairly wide rays, dense masses of phloem fibers and radial rows of phloem elements. Secondary xylem had much wider, thin-walled vessels which were either solitary or in radial multiples. The xylem fibers constituted gelatinous type and normal type. Calcium oxalate crystals were predominantly prismatic type. Powder microscopical examination showed presence of xylem parenchyma cells, xylem fibers and vessel elements. As a diploid species with 28 chromosomes, sequencing of the 314MB B. variegata genome was used to demonstrate it is the paternal ancestor of the hybrid Hong Kong Bauhinia (Bauhinia x blakeana).

== Distribution ==
They are found throughout the Southeast Asia, South Asia and southern China. They inhabit in dry broadleaf forests, moist broadleaf forests (including rainforests) in tropical, subtropical, including in Himalayan foothills. It is distributed across South Central China, Southeast Asia, South Asia.

== In cultivation ==
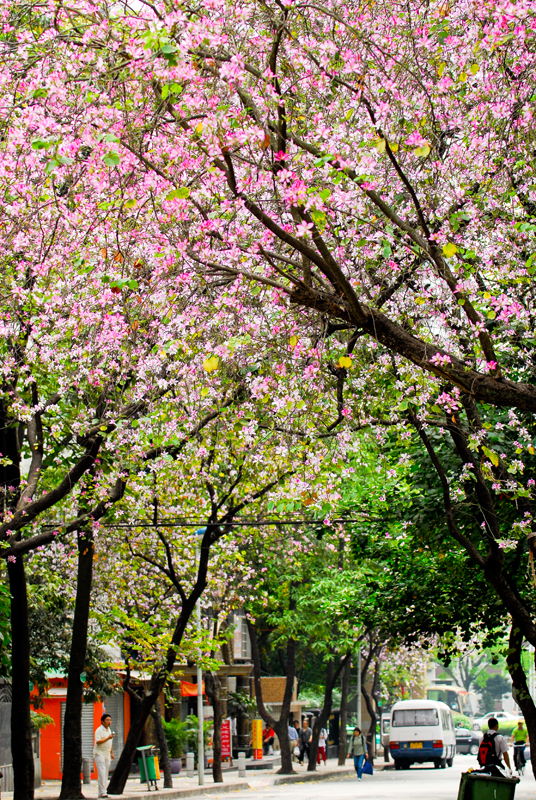
Bauhinia variegata lined street in China

This is a very popular ornamental tree in subtropical and tropical climates, grown for its scented flowers and also used as a food item in many South Asian cuisines. In the Neotropics, it can be used to attract hummingbirds—such as sapphire-spangled emerald (Amazilia lactea), glittering-bellied emerald (Chlorostilbon lucidus), or white-throated hummingbird (Leucochloris albicollis)—into gardens and parks. On the other hand, in some areas it has become naturalised and invasive as the tree can produce abundant seed pods that may self-sow; therefore regarded as potentially invasive.

=== Care ===
Bauhinia Variegata requires full sun and well-drained soils. Once established the tree is highly drought-tolerant and flowers best on drier soils; as excess water can reduce the flowering display. Excess irrigation or constantly moist conditions can keep the green foliage persistent and reduce the characteristic leafless flowering display. The tree needs to be pruned after flowering season, since flower buds form on the previous year’s old wood. This encourages the tree to produce new shoots during the growing season. The seed pods of Bauhinia variegata form after the flowers have finished blooming and often remain on the tree for months. As a legume it needs little nitrogen. High-nitrogen fertilisers promote leafy growth at the expense of flowers; a balanced or low-nitrogen feed applied sparingly during the growing season is sufficient. Occasional potassium or iron supplements may be needed in deficient or alkaline soils.

== Uses ==
Kachnar, Kovidara, Koiralo, Kanchan are local names in the Indian subcontinent for the edible buds collected from the tree; it is widely used as an ingredient in many subcontinent recipes. Traditional kachnar curry is prepared using kachnar buds, yogurt, onions and native spices. Kachnar buds are also eaten as a stir-fried vegetable and used to make achaar, a pickle in many parts of the Indian sub-continent. It shows a good antioxidant and anticancer activity.

The tree is considered very sacred in Hinduism, it is called Kovidara and it is symbolically depicted on the Dharma Dhwaja flag.

In Nepal, the plant is known as koiralo and the flower is known as koiralo ko phool in Nepali language. The flower and the buds are used to make Nepalese style achaar. The achar is important part of the meal served during the Ghode Jatra festival.

== Gallery ==
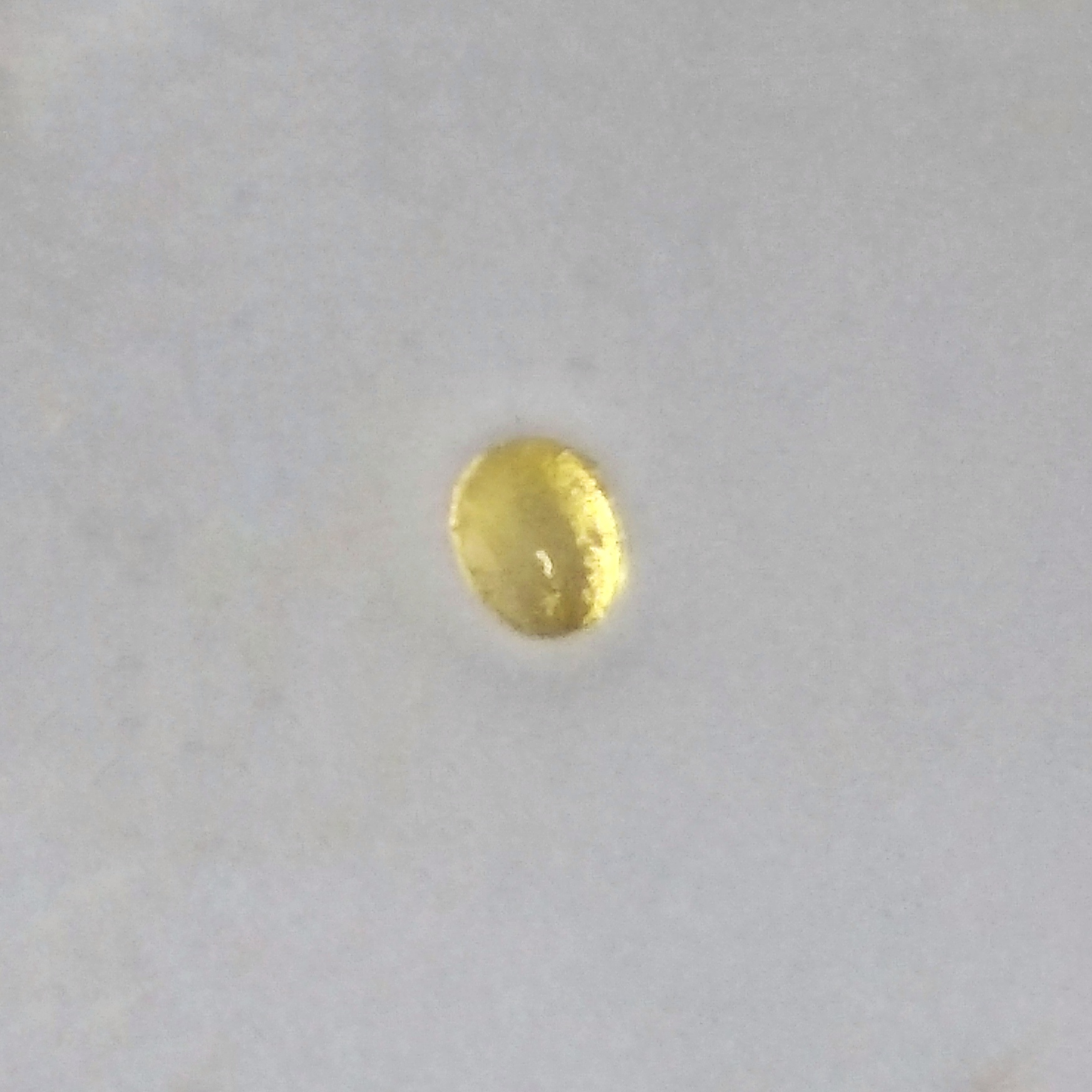
Pollen

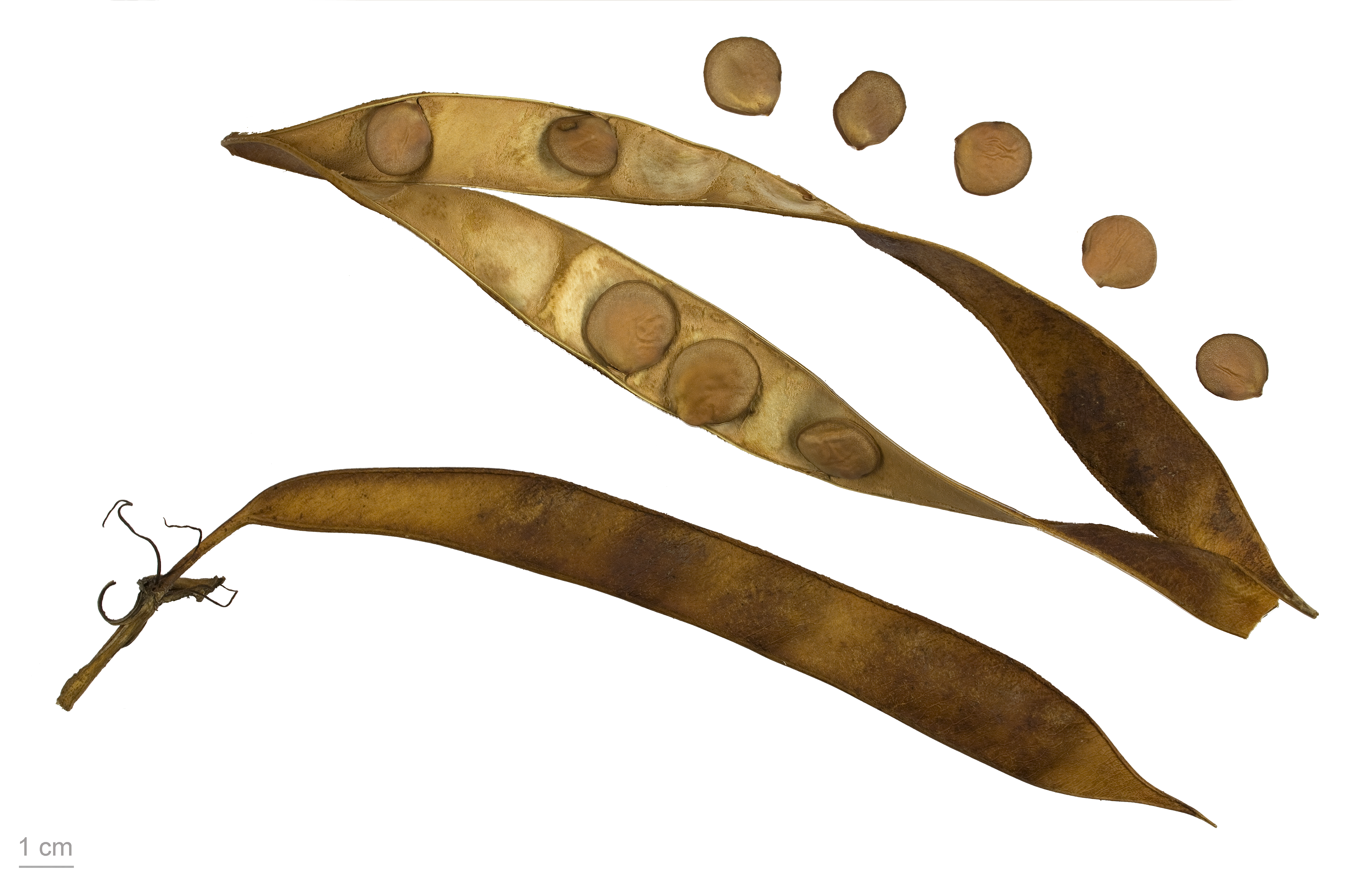
Seed pods and seeds – MHNT

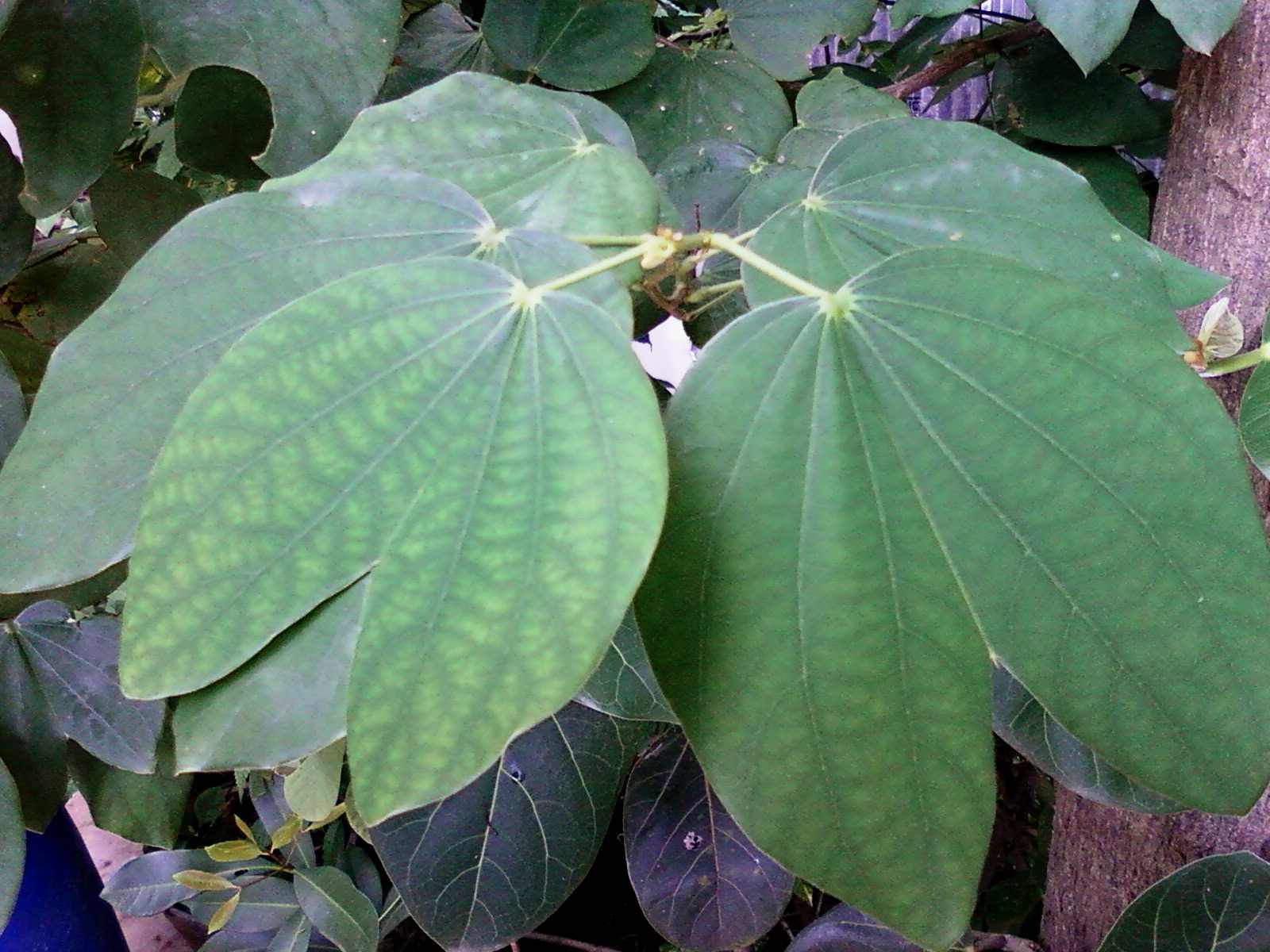
'Camel-foot' foliage

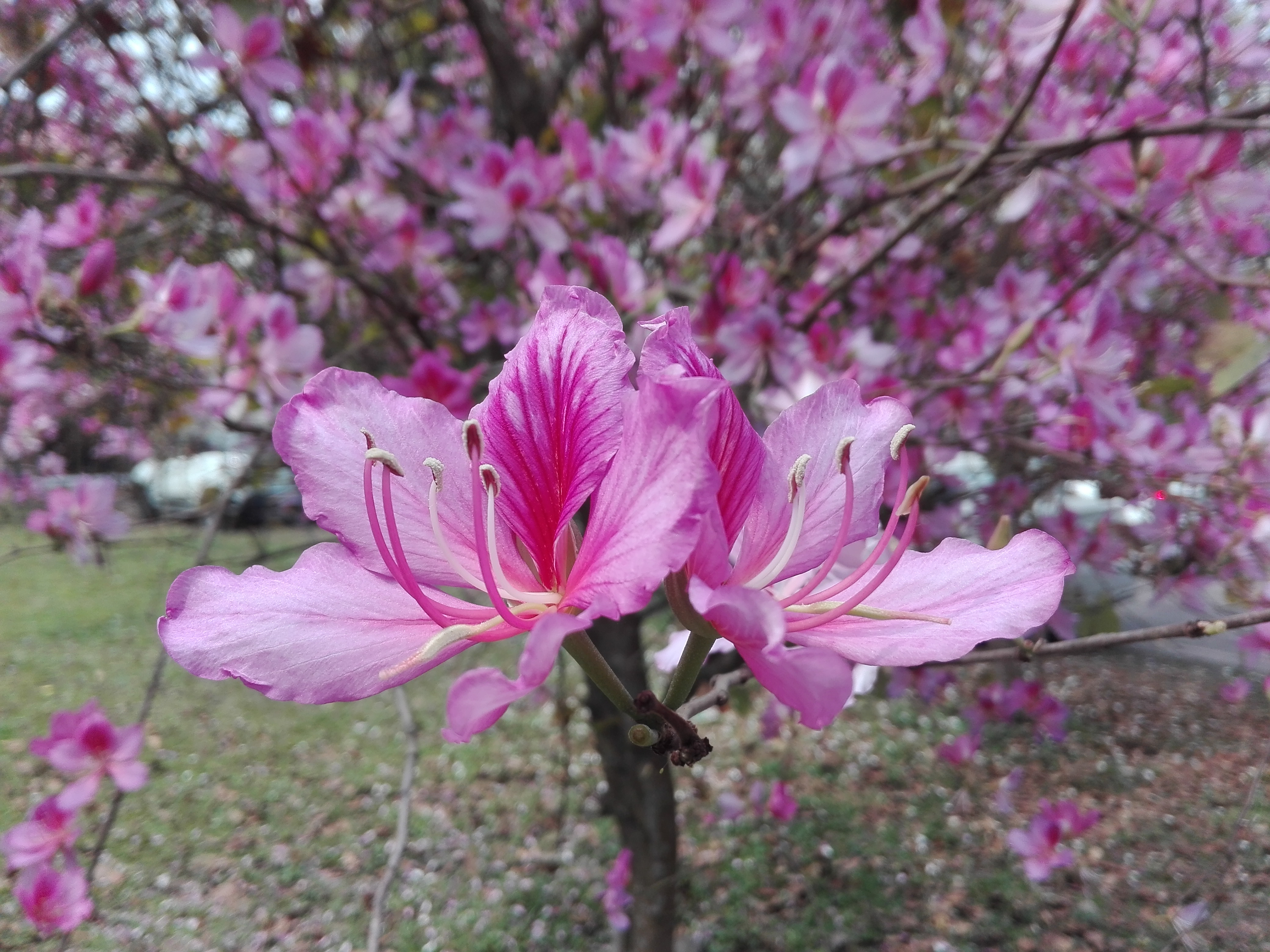
Bauhinia variegata flowers

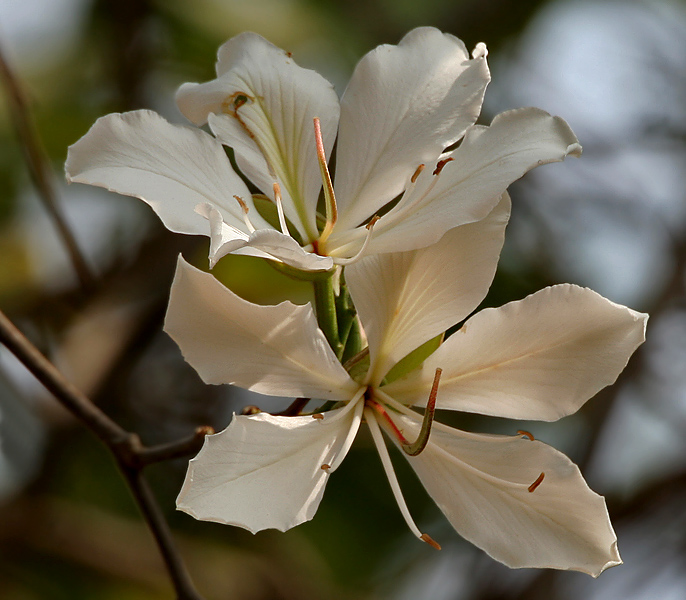
Var. candida in Hyderabad, India

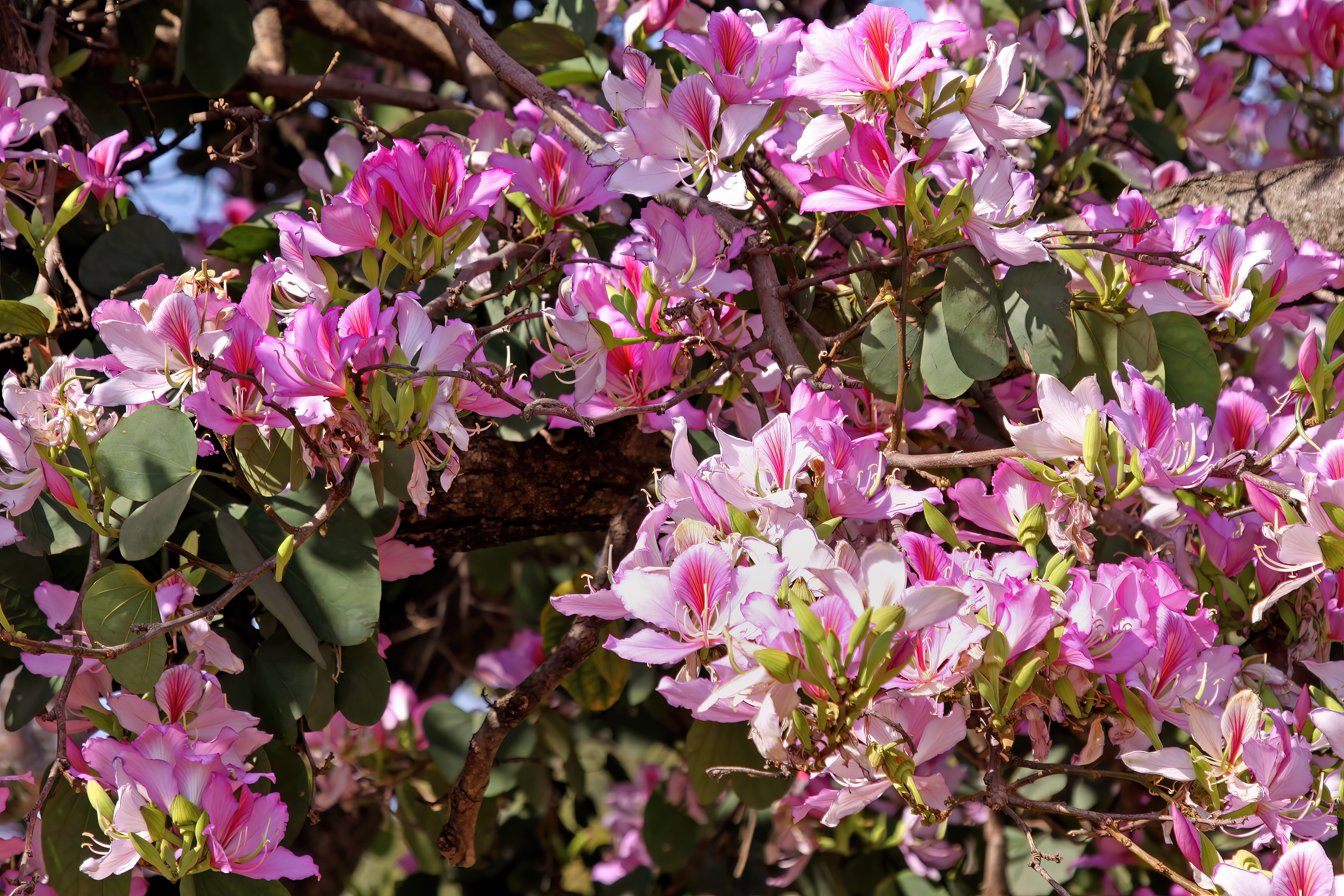
Bauhinia variegata var. variegata

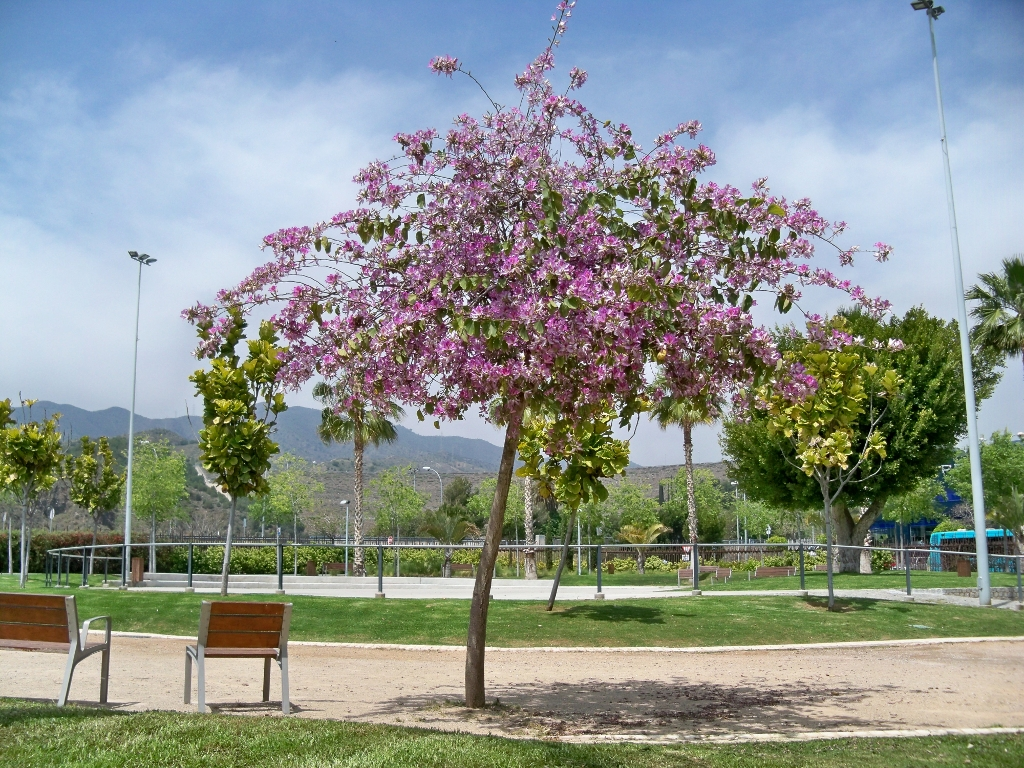
As ornamental tree in Spain

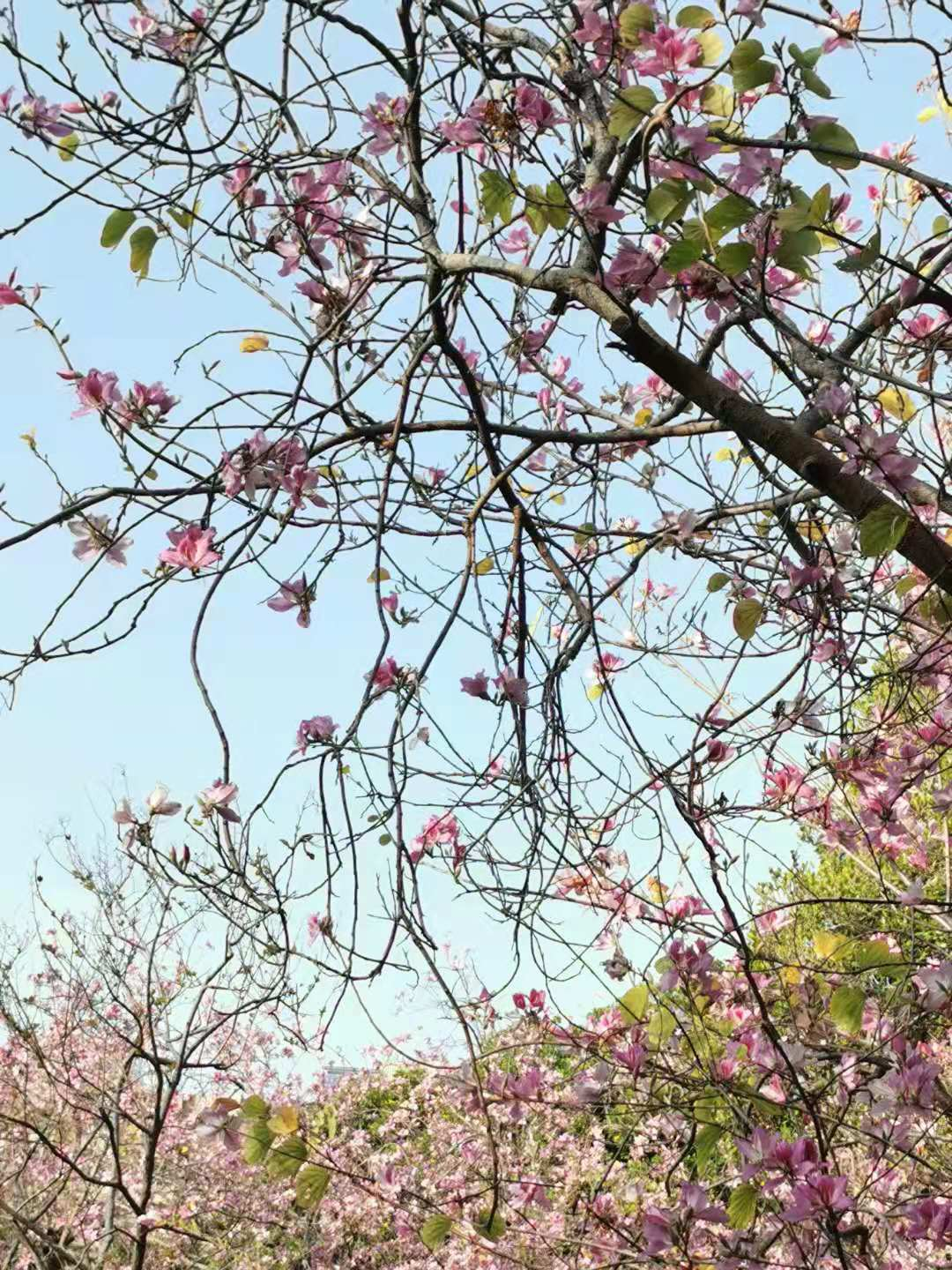
Thin branches

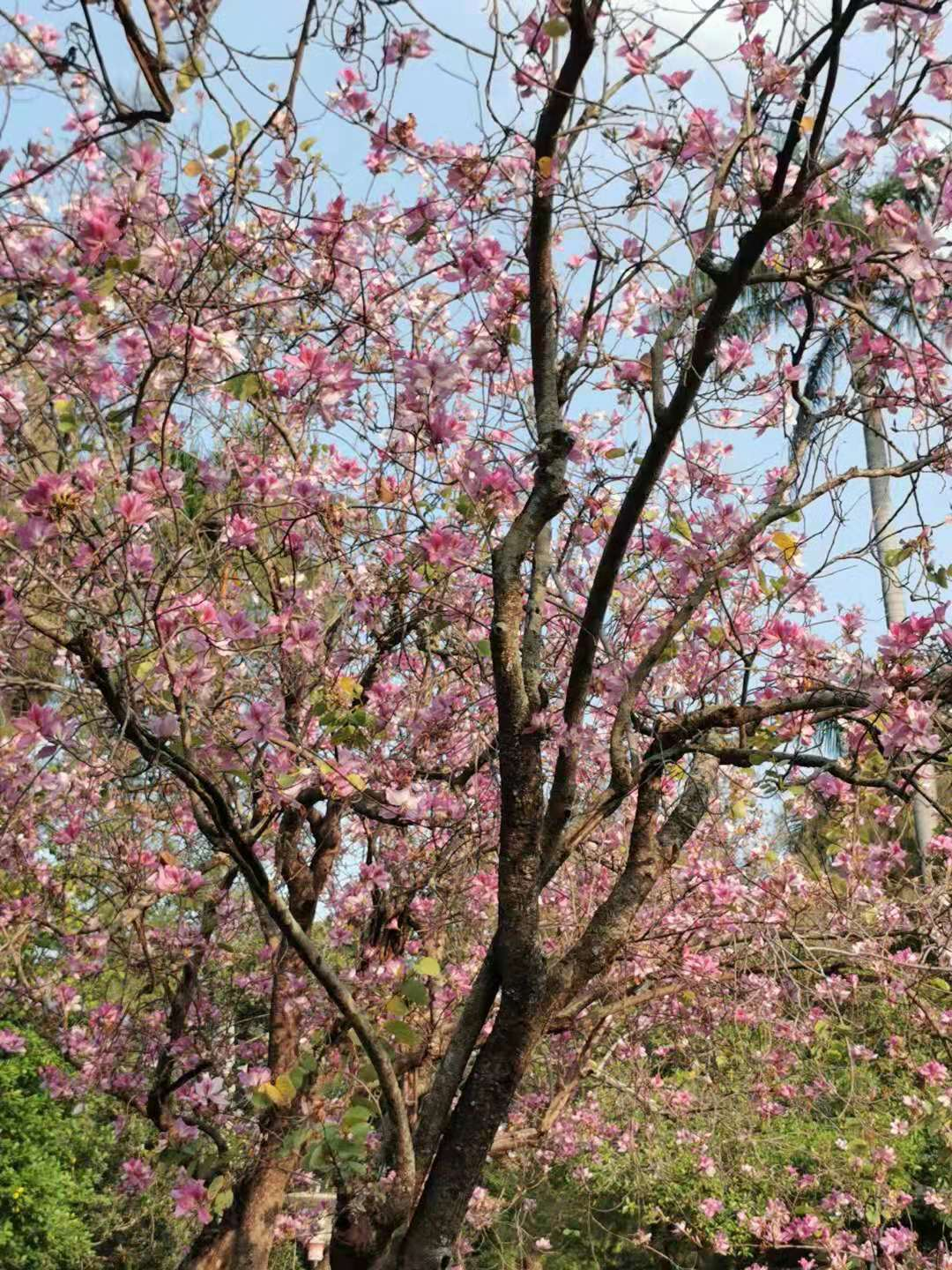
Bauhinia variegata is almost leafless during flowering. Bauhinia purpurea and Bauhinia blakeana, which are often confused with B. variegata, are leafy during flowering.

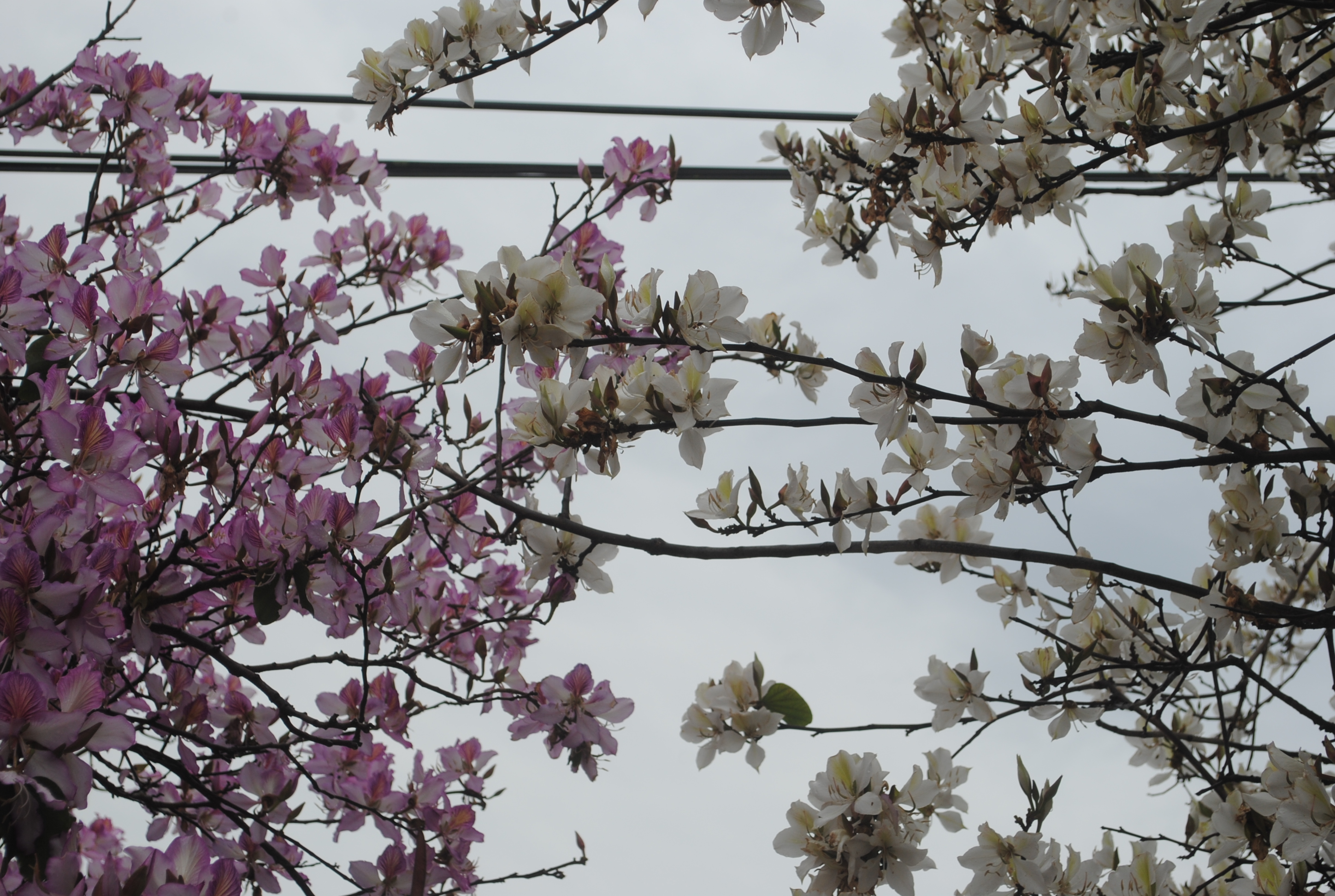
Bauhinia variegata var typica with pink flowering and var candida with white flowering growing side by side.

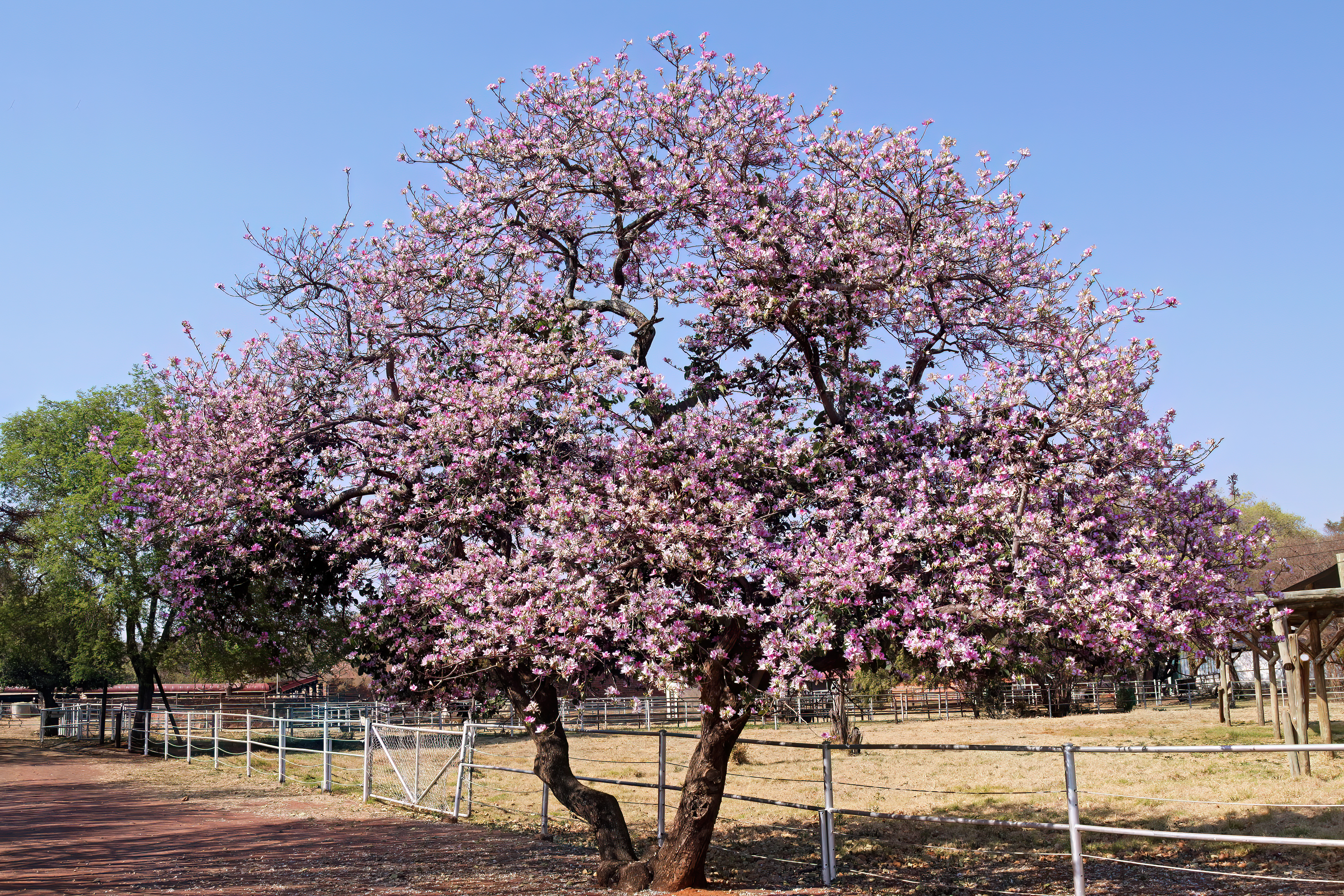
Bauhinia variegata var. variegata, South Africa

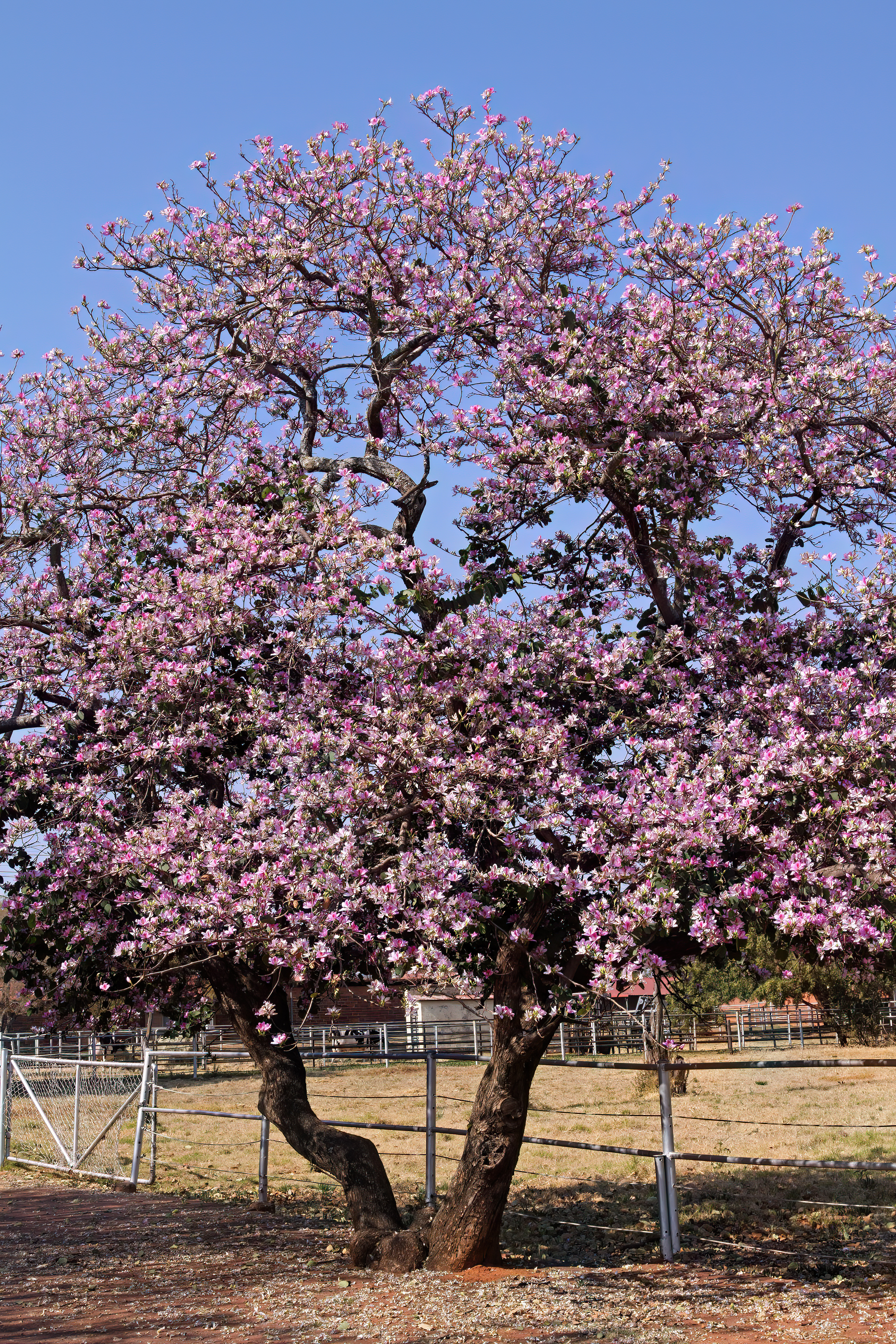
Bauhinia variegata var. variegata in full boom, South Africa

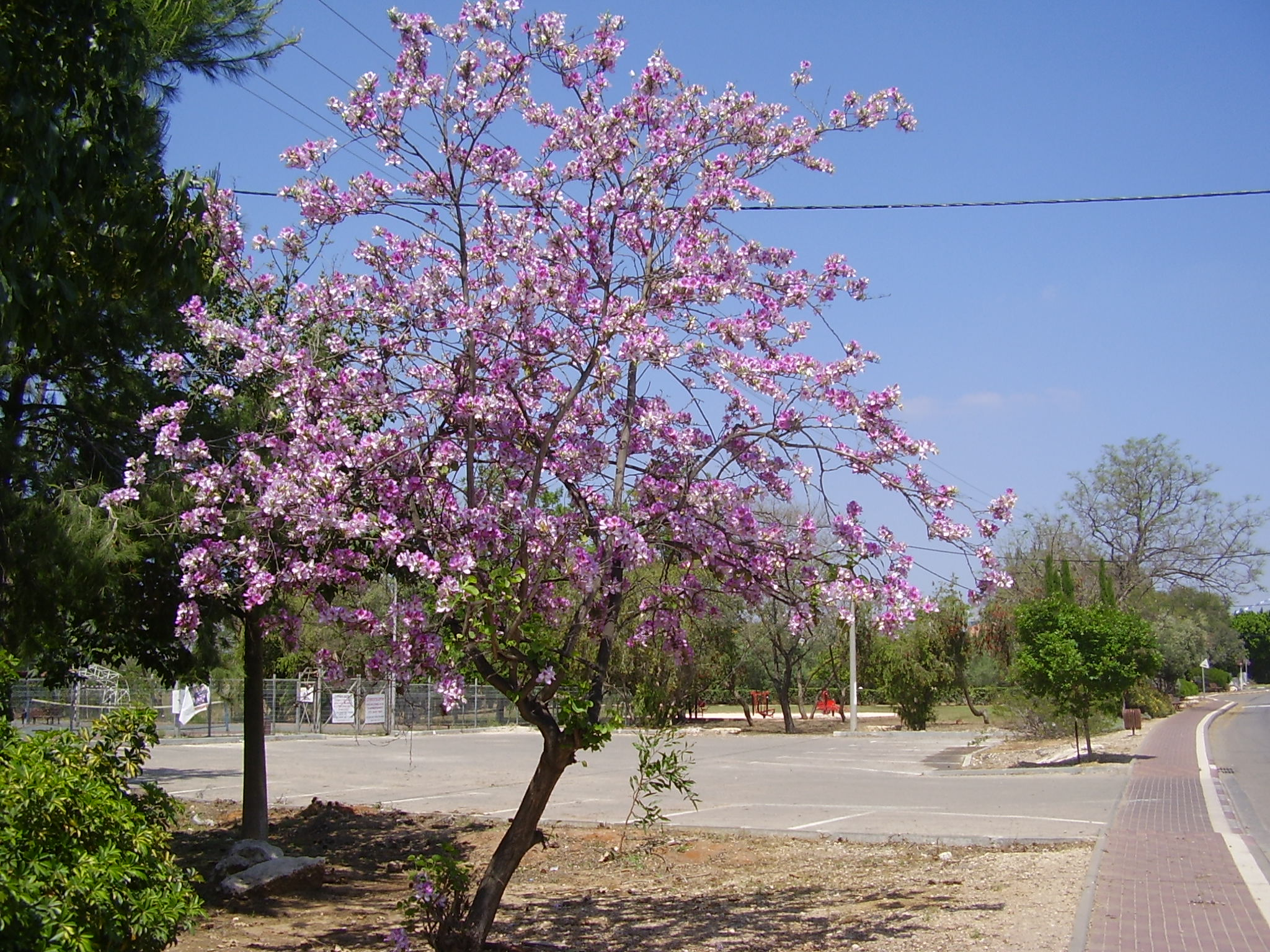

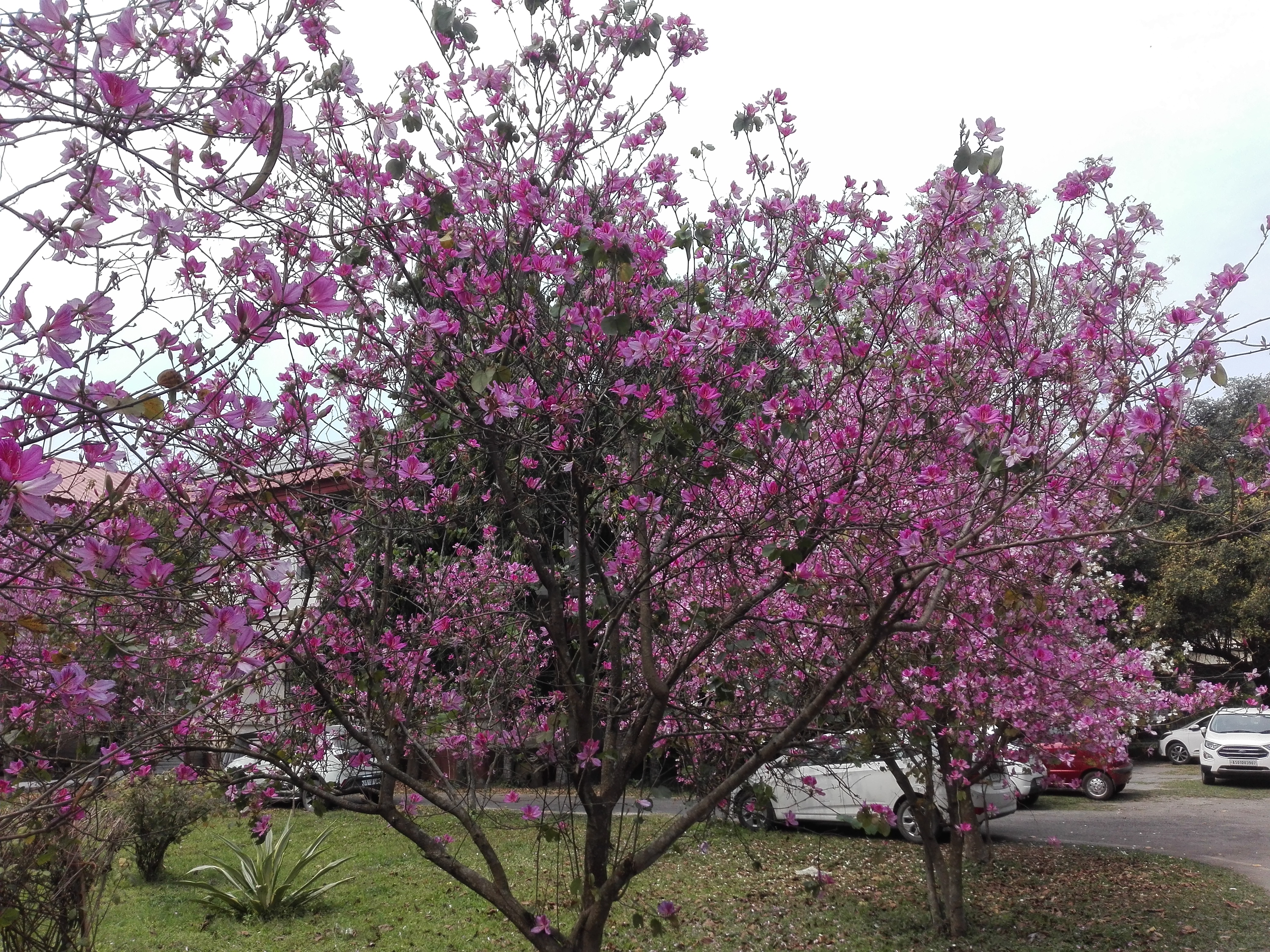

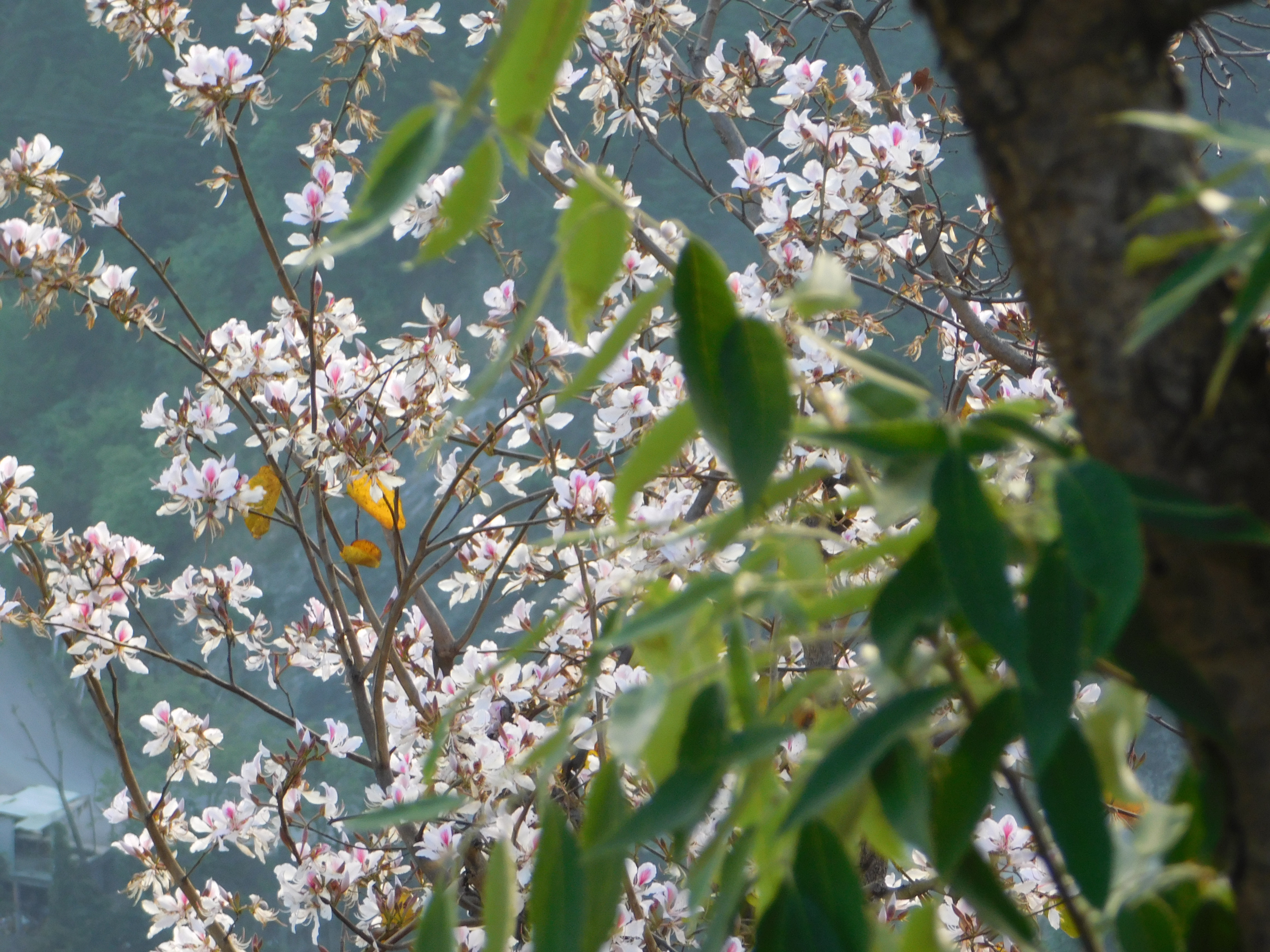

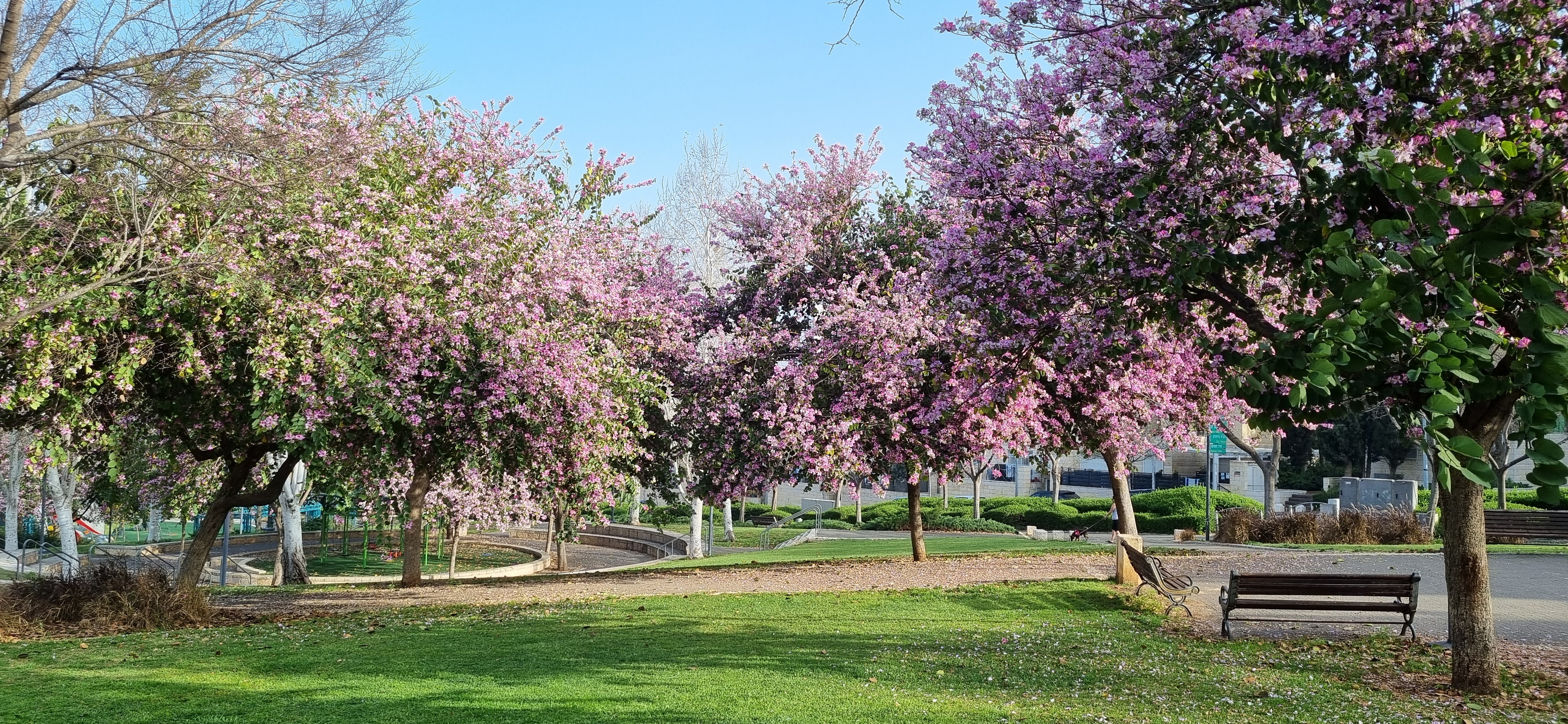

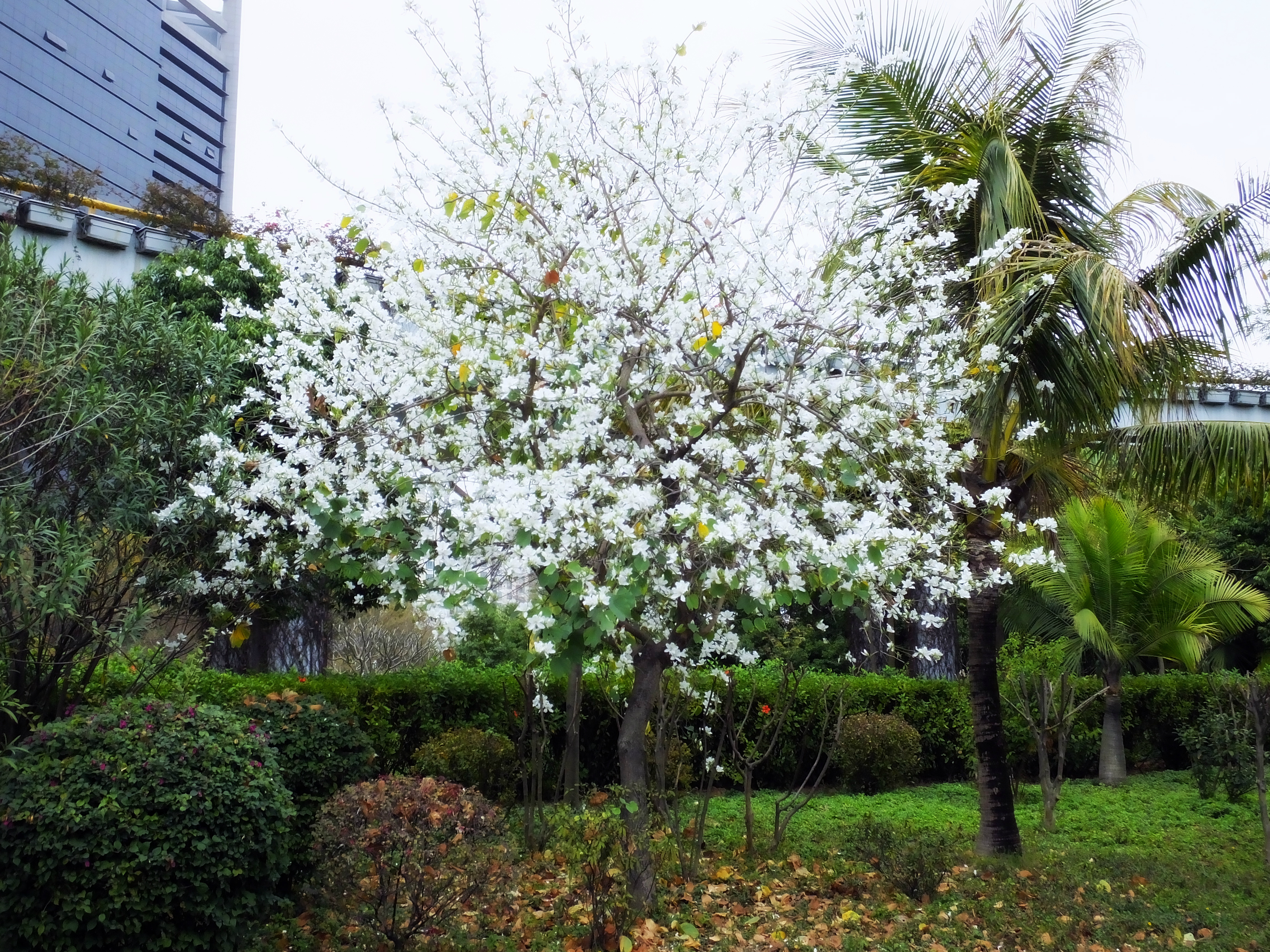
Bauhinia variegata var. candida in bloom

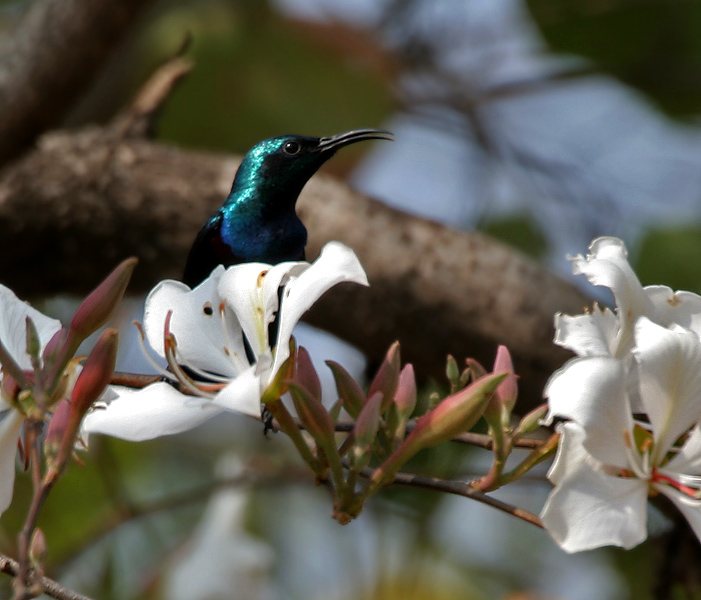
Bauhinia variegata var. candida buds and white flowers
