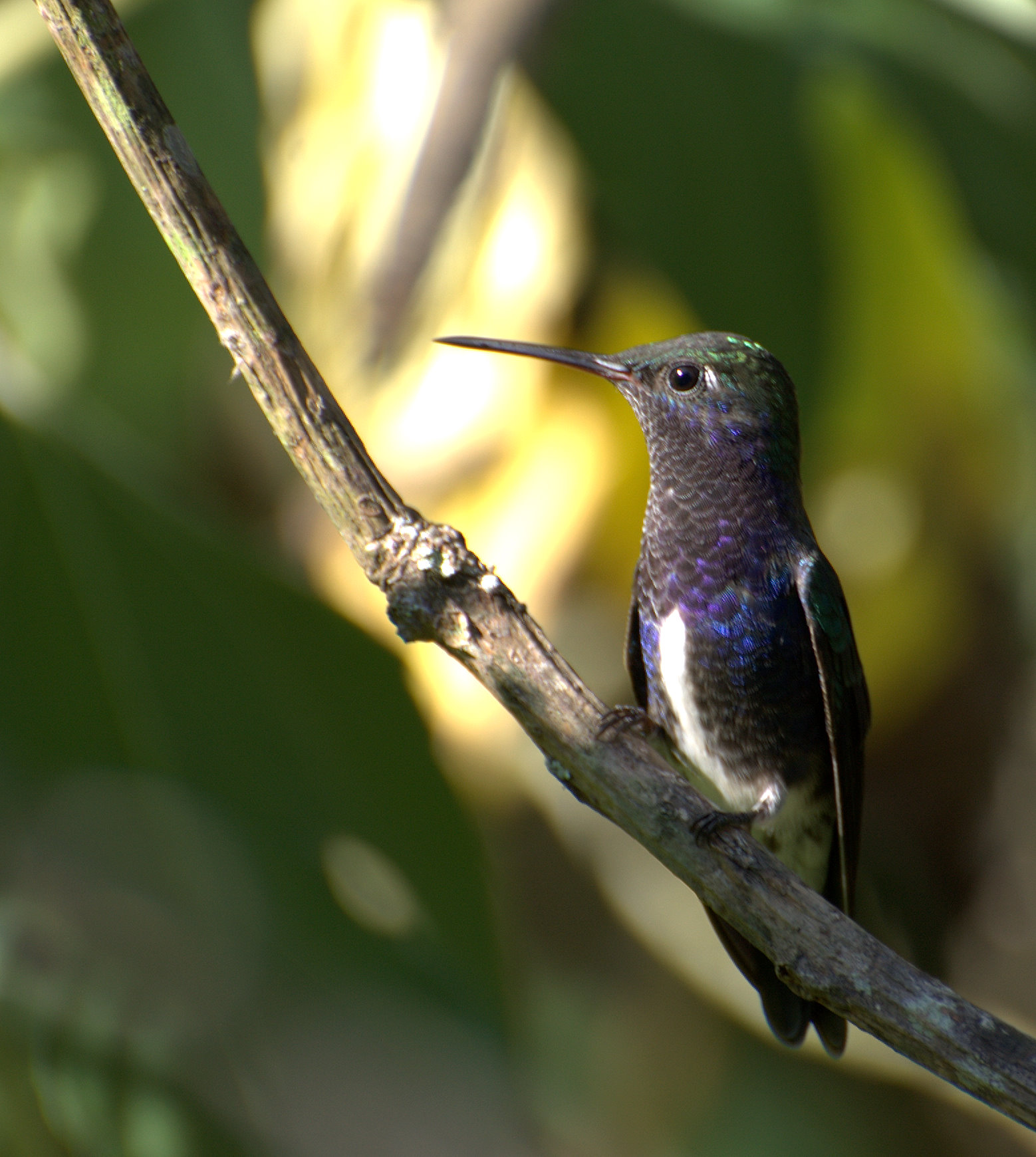
- Sapphire-spangled emerald, (Chionomesa lactea)

Scientific classification
- Kingdom: Animalia
- Phylum: Chordata
- Class: Aves
- Clade: Strisores
- Order: Apodiformes
- Family: Trochilidae
- Tribe: Trochilini
- Genus: Chionomesa; Simon, 1921

Type species
- Ornismya lactea (sapphire-spangled emerald) Lesson, R., 1832

Species
- 2, see text

= Chionomesa =

Genus of birds

Chionomesa is a genus of South American hummingbirds in the family Trochilidae.

== Species ==
The genus contains two species:

Genus Chionomesa – Simon, 1921 – two species
Common name	Scientific name and subspecies	Range	Size and ecology	IUCN status and estimated population
Glittering-throated emerald	Chionomesa fimbriata (Gmelin, JF,, 1788) Seven subspecies: C. f. elegantissima (Todd, 1942); C. f. fimbriata (Gmelin, J.F., 1788); C. f. apicalis (Gould, 1861); C. f. fluviatilis (Gould, 1861); C. f. laeta (Hartert, E., 1900); C. f. nigricauda (Elliot, D.G., 1878); C. f. tephrocephala (Vieillot, 1818)	Bolivia, Brazil, Colombia, Ecuador, the Guianas, Peru, Trinidad and Venezuela	Size: Habitat: Diet:	LC
Sapphire-spangled emerald	Chionomesa lactea (Lesson, R.,, 1832) Three subspecies: C. l. zimmeri (Gilliard, 1941); C. l. lactea (Lesson, R.); C. l. bartletti (Gould, 1866)	Bolivia, Brazil, Peru, and Venezuela; as a vagrant in Argentina	Size: Habitat: Diet:	LC

These two species were formerly placed in the genus Amazilia. A molecular phylogenetic study published in 2014 found that Amazilia was polyphyletic. In the revised classification to create monophyletic genera, these species were moved to the resurrected genus Chionomesa that had been introduced in 1921 by the French naturalist Eugène Simon. The genus name combines the Ancient Greek khiōn meaning "snow" with mesos meaning "middle". The type species was designated as the sapphire-spangled emerald by the American ornithologist Charles Wallace Richmond in 1927.
