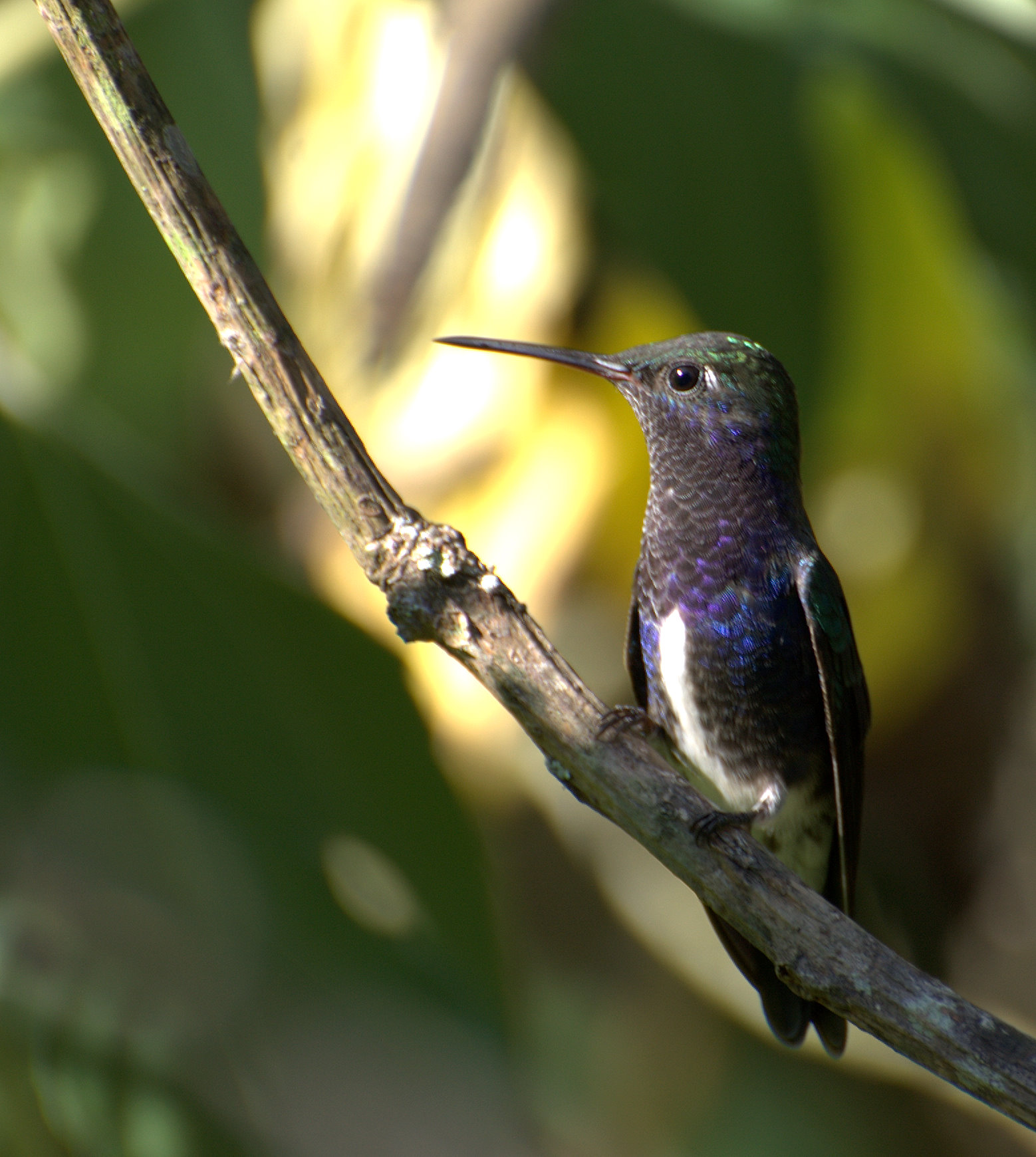

Conservation status
- Least Concern (IUCN 3.1)
- CITES Appendix II

Scientific classification
- Kingdom: Animalia
- Phylum: Chordata
- Class: Aves
- Clade: Strisores
- Order: Apodiformes
- Family: Trochilidae
- Genus: Chionomesa
- Species: C. lactea

Binomial name
- Chionomesa lactea (Lesson, R., 1832)

Synonyms
- Polyerata lactea; Amazilia lactea; Hylocharis lactea

= Sapphire-spangled emerald =

Species of hummingbird

The sapphire-spangled emerald (Chionomesa lactea) is a species of hummingbird in the "emeralds", tribe Trochilini of subfamily Trochilinae. It is regularly found in Bolivia, Brazil, Peru, and Venezuela; as a vagrant in Argentina; and has possibly occurred in Ecuador.

== Taxonomy and systematics ==
The sapphire-spangled emerald has at various times been placed in genera Hylocharis, Polyerata, and until 2014 in Amazilia. A molecular phylogenetic study published in 2014 found that Amazilia was polyphyletic. In the revised classification to create monophyletic genera, the sapphire-spangled emerald and glittering-throated emerald (Chionomesa fimbriata) were moved by most taxonomic systems to the resurrected genus Chionomesa that had been introduced in 1921 by Eugène Simon. However, BirdLife International's Handbook of the Birds of the World (HBW) retains it in Amazilia.

The South American Classification Committee of the American Ornithological Society (SACC), the International Ornithological Committee (IOC), and the Clements taxonomy assign these three subspecies to the sapphire-spangled emerald:

- C. l. zimmeri (Gilliard, 1941)
- C. l. lactea (Lesson, R.)
- C. l. bartletti (Gould, 1866)

The HBW taxonomic system treats C. l. bartletti as a separate species, the spot-vented emerald (Amazilia bartletti). Some taxonomists have suggested that C. l. zimmeri should also be treated as a species in its own right.

This article follows the IOC and Clements three-subspecies model.

== Description ==
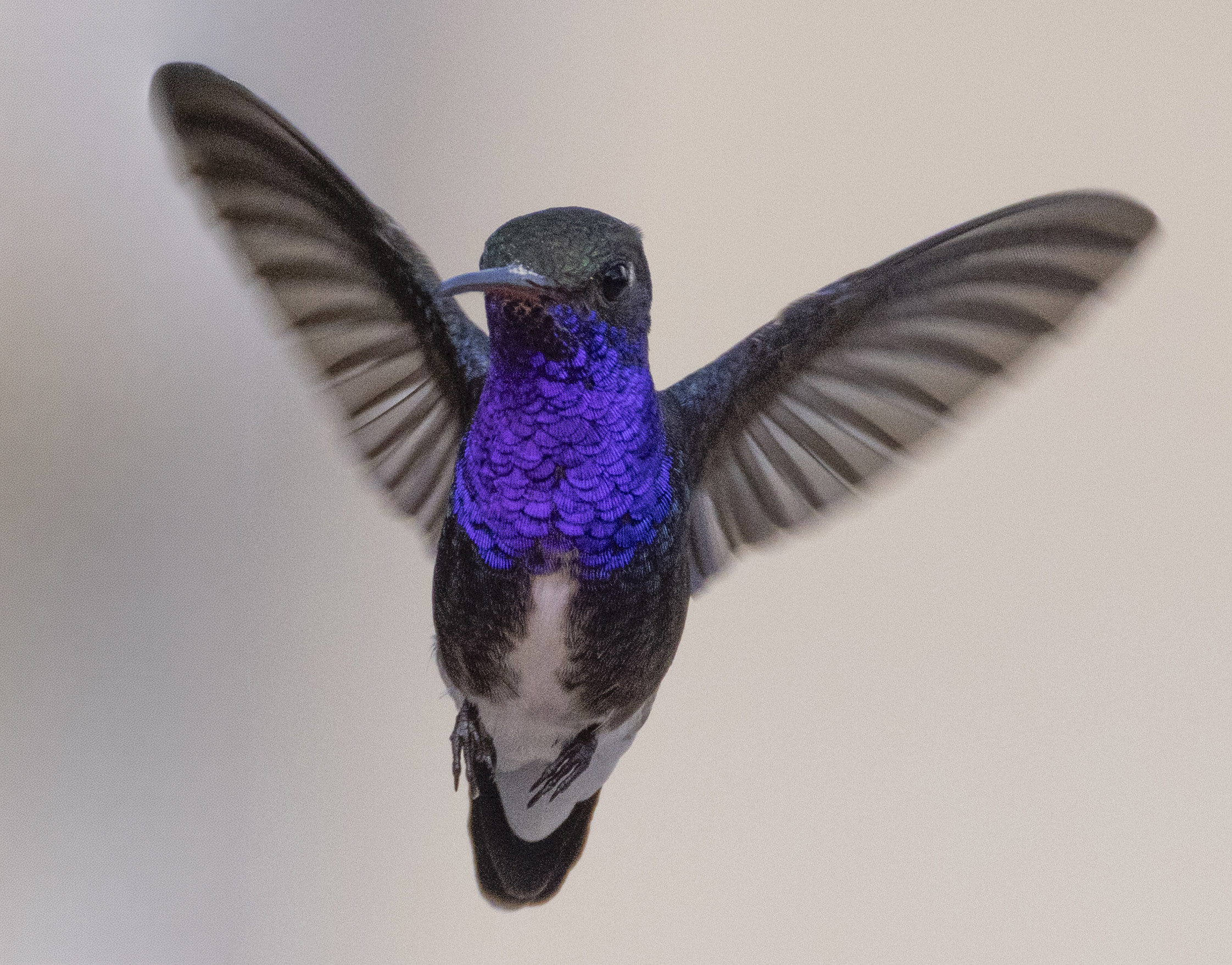
NE Brazil.

The sapphire-spangled emerald is 8 to 11 cm (3.1 to 4.3 in) long and weighs 3.6 to 5 g (0.13 to 0.18 oz). Both sexes of all subspecies have a medium length straight bill with a blackish maxilla and a pinkish to horn colored mandible with a darkish to blackish tip. Males of the nominate subspecies C. l. lactea have golden- to bronze-green upperparts with bronze-green crown, neck, and flanks. Their throat and upper breast are glittering violet-blue, the center of their lower breast white, their belly grayish, and their undertail coverts whitish with brown streaks. Their central tail feathers have shining green or bronzy green bases that darken to the end and their outer tail feathers are bluish black. Adult females are similar but have a grayish throat with glittering turquoise spots and their outermost tail feathers have grayish tips. Juveniles are similar to adult females but with much grayish on their underparts.

Males of subspecies C. l. zimmeri have a smaller patch of glittering violet-blue than the nominate; it does not extend from the throat onto the breast. Females have a whiter throat and belly than the nominate. Males of C. l. bartletti have a brighter green crown than the nominate, a grayish fringe on the throat feathers, a greenish center to the belly, a grayish lower belly, and much brown on the undertail coverts. Females resemble the males but are duller. Their throat and breast have white and gray flecks and their belly is whiter than the nominate's.

== Distribution ==
The three subspecies of sapphire-spangled emerald have separate ranges. C. l. zimmeri is the northernmost; it is found only in southeastern Venezuela's Bolívar state. The nominate C. l. lactea is found in eastern Brazil from Bahia south through Minas Gerais, Rio de Janeiro, and São Paulo into Paraná. It has also been recorded as a vagrant in northern Argentina. C. l. bartletti is found in eastern and southeastern Peru, northern Bolivia, and adjacent western Brazil. There is at least one undocumented record in extreme eastern Ecuador and the SACC classes it as hypothetical there.

The sapphire-spangled emerald in general inhabits semi-open landscapes such as the edges of rainforest, gallery forest, secondary forest, river edges, and clearings. It mostly occurs at elevations below 1,000 m (3,300 ft) but in Venezuela has the narrow elevational range between 1,100 to 1,400 m (3,600 to 4,600 ft). In addition to the semi-open landscapes, C. l. lactea is also found in open cerrado, campos rupestres, parks, and gardens. In elevation it is mostly near sea level but has been recorded locally as high as about 1,300 m (4,300 ft).

== Behavior ==
=== Movement ===
The eastern Brazilian sapphire-spangled emerald C. l. lactea makes short north-south seasonal movements that are apparently tied to the timing of its flowering nectar sources. The movements of the other two subspecies, if any, are unknown.

=== Feeding ===
The sapphire-spangled emerald forages for nectar at a wide variety of native and introduced flowering plants, shrubs, and trees. Some favored families are Leguminaceae, Malvaceae, Heliconiaceae, Bromeliaceae, and Rubiaceae, with Verbenaceae and Lythraceae being lesser sources. Males defend feeding territories. In addition to nectar, the species feeds on insects caught by hawking from a perch.

=== Breeding ===
The sapphire-spangled emerald's breeding season appears to span from October to January. It builds a cup nest of plant down and spiderweb with lichen on the outside; it is typically placed as a "saddle" on a small branch. The female incubates the clutch of two eggs for about 14 days and fledging occurs 22 to 23 days after hatch.

=== Vocalization ===
The sapphire-spangled emerald's song is "a repeated buzzy insect-like, high-pitched trill, tzee … tzitzitzee … tzitzitzee … tzitzitzee or tseeririri...tseeririri…. It also makes "tsip" and "chup" call notes.

== Status ==
The IUCN follows HBW taxonomy and therefore has assessed the sapphire-spangled and "spot-vented" emeralds separately. Both are deemed to be of Least Concern. Their population sizes are not known and are believed to be decreasing. No immediate threats have been identified for either. It is considered common to very common in most of its range, though fairly common in Peru and not well known in Bolivia. C. l. zimmeri is known only from isolated sites in its small range.

== Depiction ==
The sapphire-spangled emerald is pictured on the reverse side of the discontinued 1-Brazilian Real banknote.
