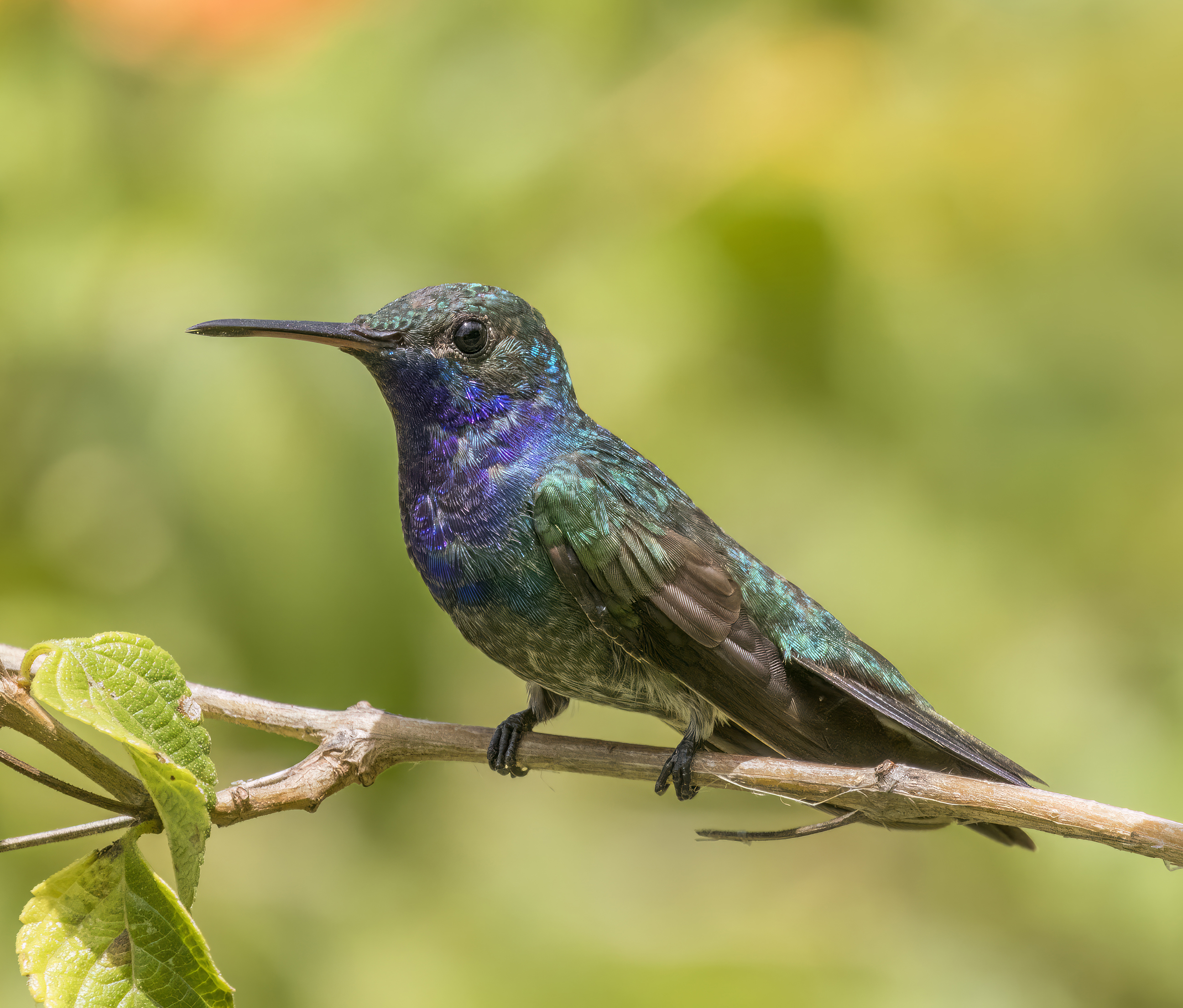
- Male, Panama

Conservation status
- Least Concern (IUCN 3.1)
- CITES Appendix II

Scientific classification
- Kingdom: Animalia
- Phylum: Chordata
- Class: Aves
- Clade: Strisores
- Order: Apodiformes
- Family: Trochilidae
- Genus: Chrysuronia
- Species: C. coeruleogularis

Binomial name
- Chrysuronia coeruleogularis (Gould, 1851)
- Range of C. coeruleogularis

Synonyms
- Sapphironia coeruleogularis

= Sapphire-throated hummingbird =

Species of bird

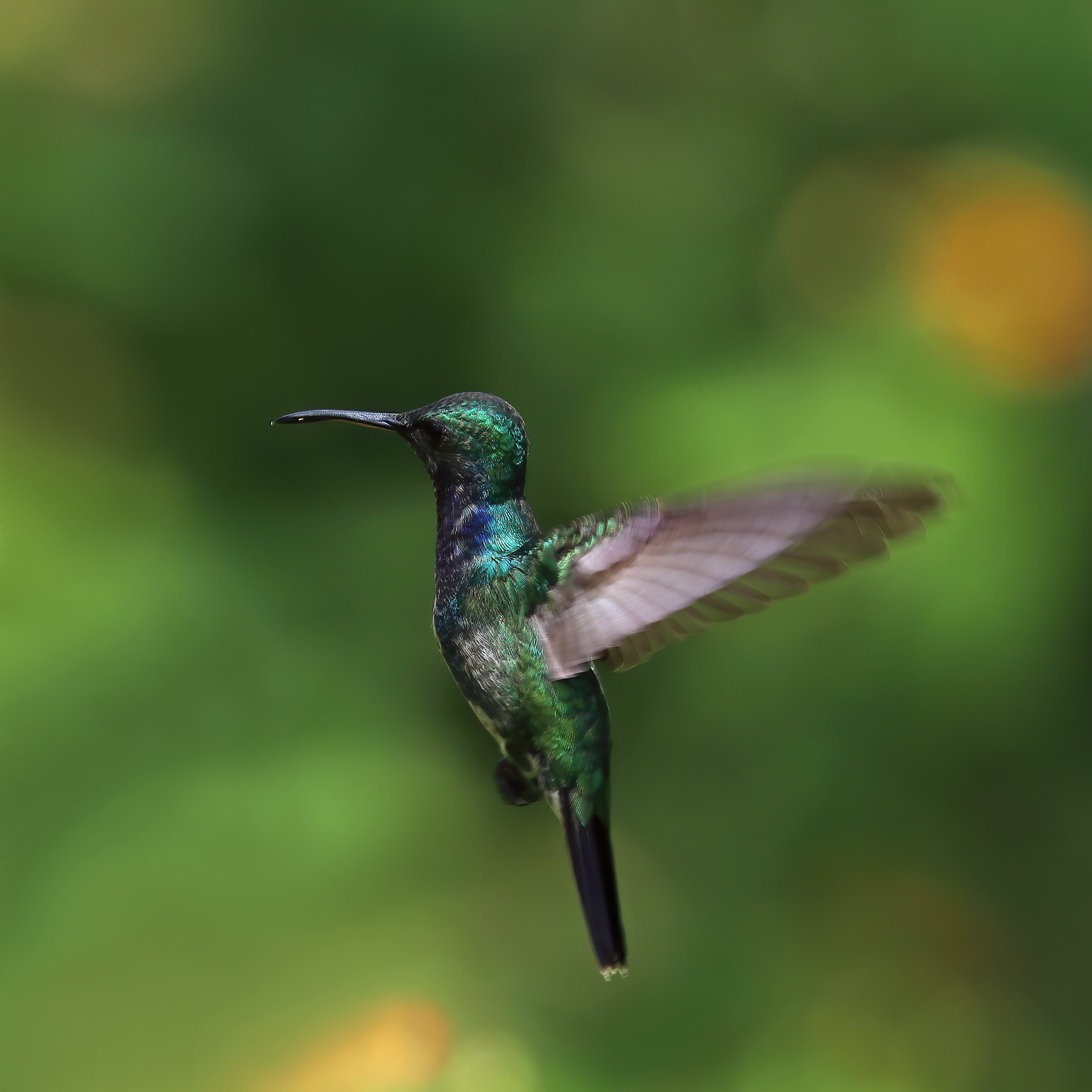
Male, Panama

The sapphire-throated hummingbird (Chrysuronia coeruleogularis) is a shiny metallic-green hummingbird found in Panama, Colombia, and more recently Costa Rica. The sapphire-throated hummingbird is separated into three subspecies; Chrysuronia coeruleogularis coeruleogularis, Chrysuronia coeruleogularis coelina, and Chrysuronia coeruleogularis conifis.

Measuring 9 cm (3.5 in), this hummingbird sports a distinctively forked tail, which helps to distinguish it from other similarly sized and colored hummingbirds. The male is metallic green overall, with a violet-blue throat and dark tail. The female has entirely white underparts from throat to vent and distinctive green spots along the sides of the breast.

Due to its large home range and adaptability to habitat change, the sapphire-throated hummingbird is listed as a species of least concern by the IUCN Red List. It prefers to live in mangroves, scrubs, and light forests, however is able to adapt if need be.

== Taxonomy ==
The sapphire-throated hummingbird is part of the order Apodiformes, which includes the hummingbirds, swifts and treeswifts. They are part of the family Trochilidae, also known as the hummingbirds, which are distinguished by their small size, high metabolism and extremely rapid wing-flapping. Although part of the same genus, the sapphire-throated hummingbird is taxonomically closer related to the blue-headed sapphire (Chrysuronia grayi) than the shining-green hummingbird. Additionally, the sapphire-throated hummingbird acts as an outgroup for some members of the genus Amazilia, such as the white-chested emerald (Amazilia brevirostris) and the plain-bellied emerald (Amazilia leucogaster).

After first being described in 1851, it was later discovered that there are two other subspecies of the hummingbird based on a difference of distribution and coloration, with the nominate subspecies being Chrysuronia coeruleogularis coeruleogularis. In 1856, the second subspecies was discovered further north and named Chrysuronia coeruleogularis coelina. Most recently in 1932, the third and final subspecies was discovered further east and named Chrysuronia coeruleogularis conifis.

This species was formerly placed in the genus Lepidopyga. A molecular phylogenetic study published in 2014 found that Lepidopyga was polyphyletic. In the revised classification to create monophyletic genera, the sapphire-throated hummingbird was moved to Chrysuronia.

== Description ==
The sapphire-throated hummingbird has a full shiny metallic-green plumage, except for its darker tail and wings. The male has a broad, glistening blue-patched throat, whereas the female has a white-patched throat. The female also has distinct green spots along the sides of its breast. The tail is deeply notched and tipped with black coloration. The nominate subspecies Lepidopyga coeruleogularis coeruleogularis has a darker throat patch, whereas the subspecies Chrysuronia coeruleogularis conifis has a more turquoise tone, and the subspecies Chrysuronia coeruleogularis coelina has a lighter-blue tone. Small in size, the hummingbird measures about 8.5–9.5 cm (3.3–3.7 in) centimeters in length and 4–4.5 grams (0.14–0.16 oz) in weight. The males have a straight, short bill with the maxilla colored black and the mandible colored a more pinkish tone and tipped with black.

The sapphire-throated hummingbird is often mistaken for the other members of its genus which includes the sapphire-bellied hummingbird (Chrysuronia lilliae) and the shining-green hummingbird (Chrysuronia goudoti). Unlike the sapphire-throated hummingbird, the male sapphire-bellied hummingbird has a darker shiny blue coloration on its throat which covers its entire ventral-side with the exception of the white undertail. The shining-green hummingbird differs in that it has very little to no blue plumage in comparison to the other two Lepidopyga species.

== Distribution and habitat ==
=== Distribution ===
The sapphire-throated hummingbird has a large range, with an estimated distribution size of 88,900 km^{2}. Although the global population size has not been calculated, it is described to be patchy. Overall, the hummingbird is found throughout Panama, Colombia and most recently Costa Rica. The nominate subspecies Chrysuronia coeruleogularis coeruleogularis can be found in Pacific western Panama, ranging from Chiriquí to Canal Zone. The subspecies Chrysuronia coeruleogularis confinis is more specifically found on the Caribbean slope in eastern Panama and north-west Columbia. Whereas the subspecies Chrysuronia coeruleogularis coelina is more specifically found in the northern parts of Colombia, from north Chocó through Ciénaga Grande de Santa Marta.

In 2008, a male species of sapphire-throated hummingbird was discovered in Costa Rica as far as 35 kilometers north of the Panamanian border. This suggests that the hummingbirds are slowly dispersing northwards and establishing new territories. However, some unconfirmed records from 1962 in Costa Rica are thought to have been a mislabeled specimen, which was later found to be a sapphire-throated hummingbird.

=== Habitat ===
The sapphire-throated hummingbird is most commonly found in coastal forests, occupying secondary forests, scrubby clearings and less frequently mangrove patches. They prefer light forests and forest edges over dense forests. The hummingbirds have been found using modified habitats, such as protected areas like the Tayrona National Natural Park in Colombia. They can reach elevations of up to 100m above mean sea level.

== Behaviour ==
Since it is a Central and South American species, the sapphire-throated hummingbird does not undergo huge migrations like other northern hummingbirds such as the ruby-throated hummingbird. However, they may undergo local altitude dispersal due to habitat change. They live a solitary life in which they neither live nor migrate in flocks. During flight, hummingbirds have one of the highest metabolism and therefore require to eat more than their own weight in nectar each day to avoid starvation. Unlike most birds, the hummingbirds flap their wings upwards instead of downwards by inverting their wings, and therefore having a similar mechanism to insects.

=== Breeding ===
==== Courtship ====
The sapphire-throated hummingbird is polygamous, and therefore remains solitary until the need to reproduce. Typically, only the males exhibit promiscuity, however sometimes females may also mate with several males. In order to gain the female's approval, the male performs a courtship display by flying in a u-shaped pattern for the female. Once the female accepts the male, and copulation is complete, the male immediately separates and leaves the female. The males are only involved in mating and neglect to contribute to choosing nest location, building the nest, or raising the young.

==== Nesting and incubation ====
After copulation, the female hummingbird chooses a location for a nest, typically in a shrub, bush or tree. Placed on a low and thin forked branch, she makes the nest in the shape of a cup with plant fibers woven together and covered in moss as a form of camouflage. In an attempt to add elasticity and strength for the nesting space, the female strategically adds soft plant fibers, animal hair and down feather into the nest, and secures it with spider webs and other sticky materials. Overall the nest is small and deep.

==== Eggs ====
On average, due to its small body, the sapphire-throated hummingbird has a clutch size of only two eggs. After an incubation period of 15 to 16 days, the young hatch with no down feather and no ability to fly or see. Overall, the fledging period lasts 19 to 22 days. Since the males do not aid with raising the young, the females are left to protect and feed the younglings via regurgitated food. In order to feed the chicks, the female uses her long bill to push the regurgitated insects directly into the chicks' throat.

=== Diet ===
Generally, the sapphire-throated hummingbird feeds on nectar and insects. Being a solitary feeder, during peak flowering season they may sometimes build small home-structures around flowering trees in an effort to defend their food resources. During the rest of the year they mainly feed on low-growing flowers.

==== Nectar ====
The sapphire-throated hummingbird typically feeds on the nectar of brightly colored flowers of trees and shrubs. In order to compensate for their high metabolism, they prefer flowers with high sugar content such as those from the families Fabaceae, Rubiaceae, and Myrtaceae.

They feed on tubular-shaped flowers by extending their long tongue to retrieve the nectar, while simultaneously hovering or perching on the flower or branch. In the process, the hummingbirds may frequently become covered in pollen and in turn contribute to the pollination of plants, creating a symbiosis relationship between the plant and bird.

In more human-established areas, the sapphire-throated hummingbird may also retrieve their nectar from hummingbird feeders places by locals.

==== Insects ====
Although the main food resource for the sapphire-throated hummingbird is nectar, it does not supply enough protein for the bird, especially during breeding season and the juvenile's fledging period. Therefore, the hummingbird also feeds on arthropods, such as flies and spiders.

=== Vocalization ===
Although not a song-call, hummingbirds can often be distinguished by their buzzing sound made from rapid wing-flapping. Like most birds, the sapphire-throated hummingbirds has many calls, but their most common song is a high-pitched rattle sounding like "wi-didididididididididi".

== Conservation ==
The sapphire-throated hummingbird is currently listed as a species of least concern due to its extent of occurrence being greater than 20,000 km^{2}, despite population declines, habitat destruction and habitat alteration. Although many of their habitats have been destroyed in the last decades for agriculture and other purposes, the sapphire-throated hummingbird can easily adapt to a new habitat if need be, and are therefore dispersing farther north with no harm to their populations.
