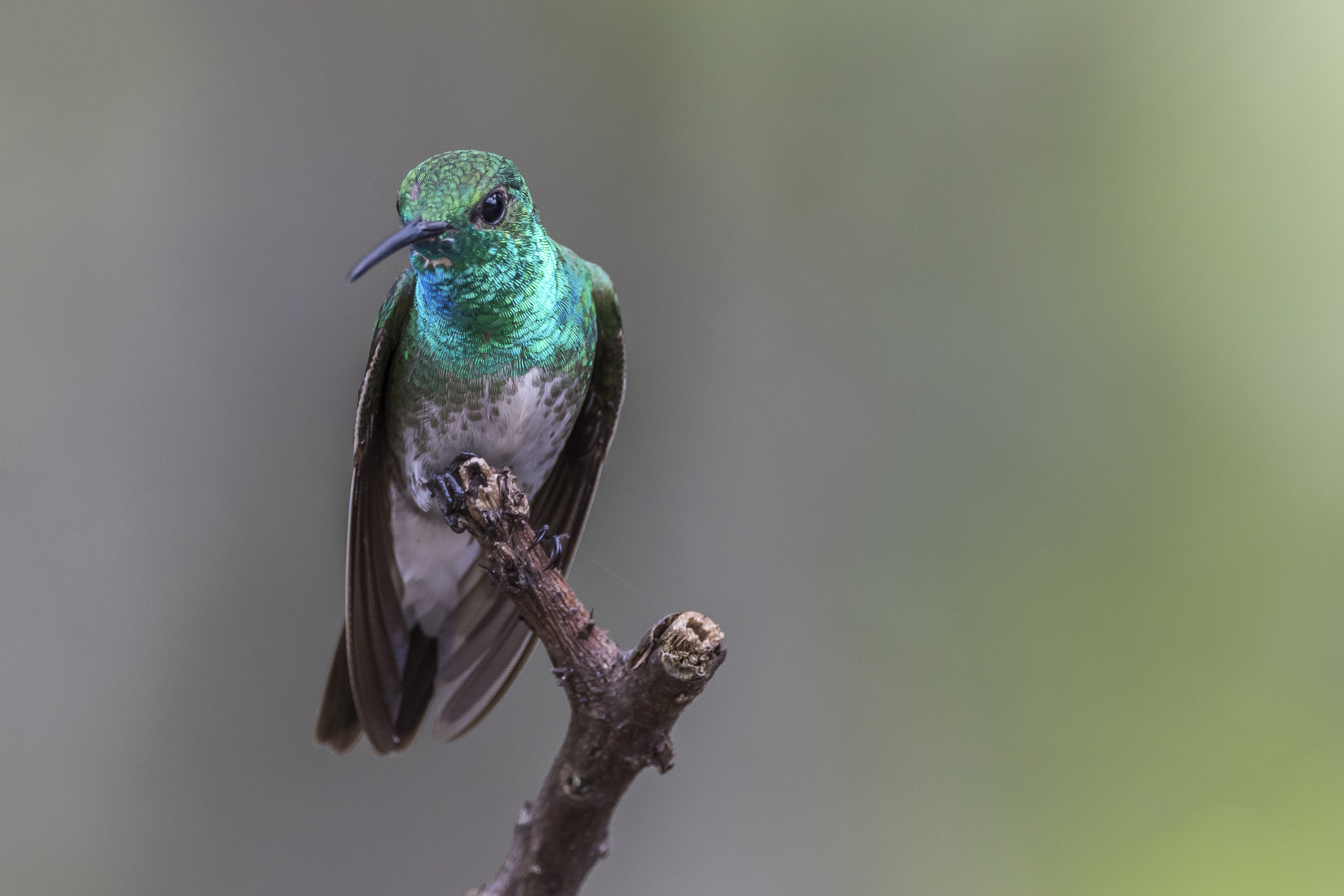

Conservation status
- Endangered (IUCN 3.1)
- CITES Appendix II

Scientific classification
- Kingdom: Animalia
- Phylum: Chordata
- Class: Aves
- Order: Apodiformes
- Family: Trochilidae
- Genus: Chrysuronia
- Species: C. boucardi

Binomial name
- Chrysuronia boucardi (Mulsant, 1877)
- Range

Synonyms
- Polyerata boucardi

= Mangrove hummingbird =

The mangrove hummingbird (Chrysuronia boucardi) is an Endangered species of hummingbird in the "emeralds", tribe Trochilini of subfamily Trochilinae. It is endemic to Costa Rica.

== Taxonomy ==
The mangrove hummingbird was formally described in 1877 by the French ornithologist Étienne Mulsant from a specimen collected by Adolphe Boucard near Puntarenas in Costa Rica. Mulsant placed the new species in the genus Arena and coined the binomial name Arena boucardi. The mangrove hummingbird was formerly placed in the genus Amazilia. When a phylogenetic study published in 2024 found the species was most closely related to the sapphire-throated hummingbird (Chrysuronia coeruleogularis), the mangrove hummingbird was transferred from Amazilia to the genus Chrysuronia. The genus name is a portmanteau of the specific names of two synonyms of the golden-tailed sapphire: Ornismya chrysura Lesson, R, 1832 and Ornismia oenone Lesson, 1832. The specific epithet was chosen to honour the collector Boucard. The species is monotypic: no subspecies are recognised.

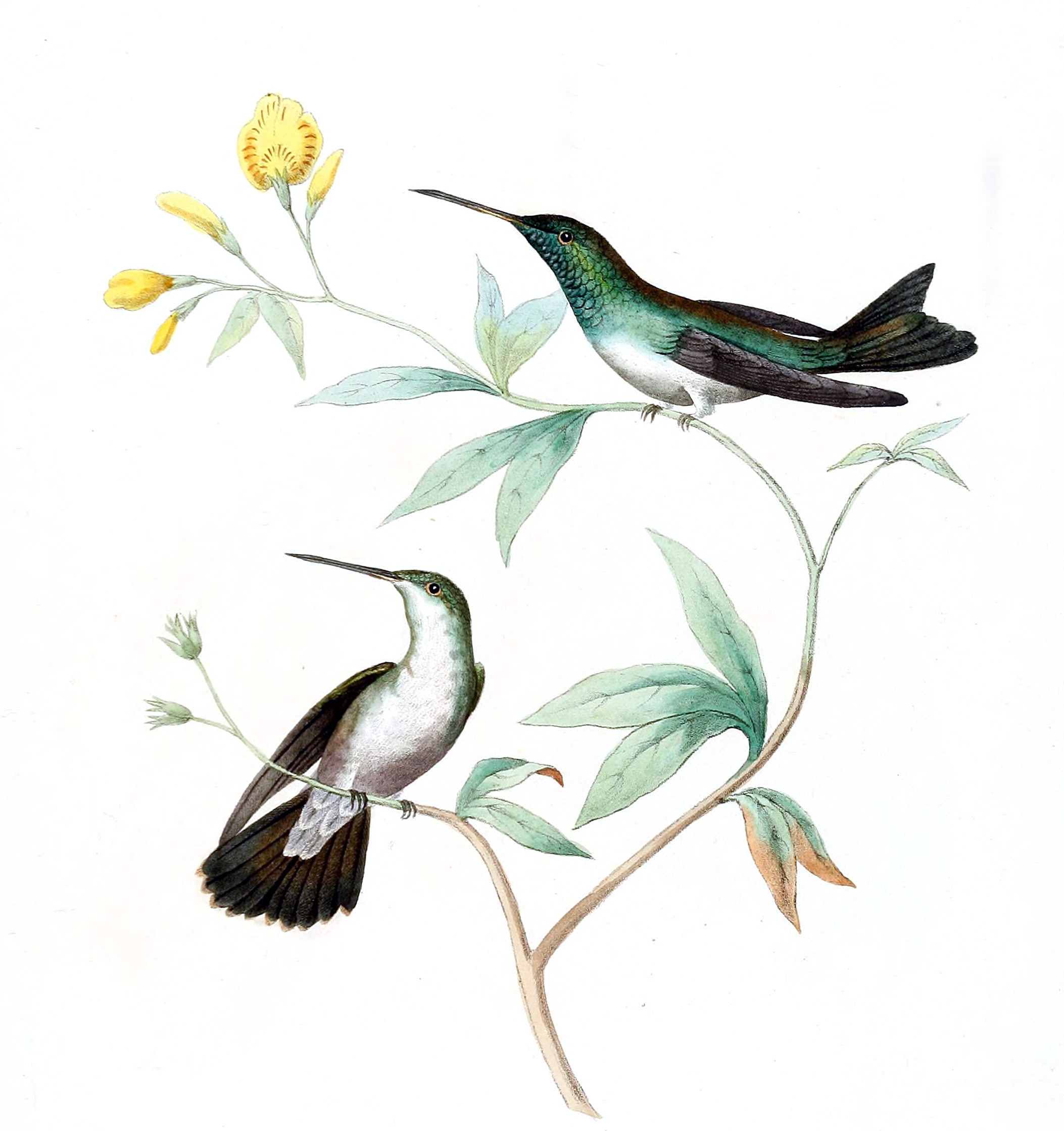

== Description ==
The mangrove hummingbird is 9.5 to 11 cm (3.7 to 4.3 in) long and weighs about 4.5 g (0.16 oz). Both sexes have a medium length bill, slightly decurved, with a black maxilla and a reddish mandible with a dusky tip. Adult males have golden to bronze-green upperparts and flanks. Their chin, throat, and breast are glittering bluish green with white bars near the end of the chin feathers. Their belly is whitish with bronze-green sides and their undertail coverts are white. The slightly forked tail is bronzy green; the outer feathers have blackish outer edges and tips. Adult females are similar to males, but with less green on the underparts and grayish tips on the outermost tail feathers. Immature birds resemble adult females but are more grayish below.

One form of vocalization has been described in words as a "soft djt sound that is rapid and given in a descending twitter."

== Distribution and habitat ==
The mangrove hummingbird is sedentary. It is found only on the Pacific coast of Costa Rica. It inhabits large stands of tea mangrove Pelliciera rhizophorae and sometimes adjacent terrestrial second growth. Its distribution is not continuous.

== Behavior ==
=== Feeding ===
The mangrove hummingbird forages for nectar, primarily at mangrove flowers. It has also been observed feeding at Inga, Heliconia, and Maripa in a terrestrial forest clearing near mangroves. In addition to nectar it feeds on insects.

=== Breeding ===
The mangrove hummingbird's breeding season spans from October to February. It builds a cup nest of balsa (Ochroma pyramidale) floss and other soft plant fibers bound with spiderweb and with lichens on the outside. It is usually placed on a mangrove twig between 1 and 4 m (3 and 10 ft) above the water. The female incubates the clutch of two eggs, but the incubation period and time to fledging are not known.

== Status ==
The IUCN originally assessed the mangrove hummingbird as Threatened, then in 1994 as Vulnerable, and since 2000 as Endangered. It has a restricted range and habitat requirements. Its estimated population of between 1500 and 7000 mature individuals is believed to be decreasing. Its mangrove habitat is continuing to be destroyed for salt evaporation, shrimp farming, charcoal production, and human habitation. Though cutting mangroves is illegal in Costa Rica, the law is widely ignored. Road and dike construction has affected some areas by altering their hydrology. Pollution, especially from Puntarenas on the Golfo de Nicoya, has also degraded mangrove stands. The species' habitat is protected in a few small reserves.
