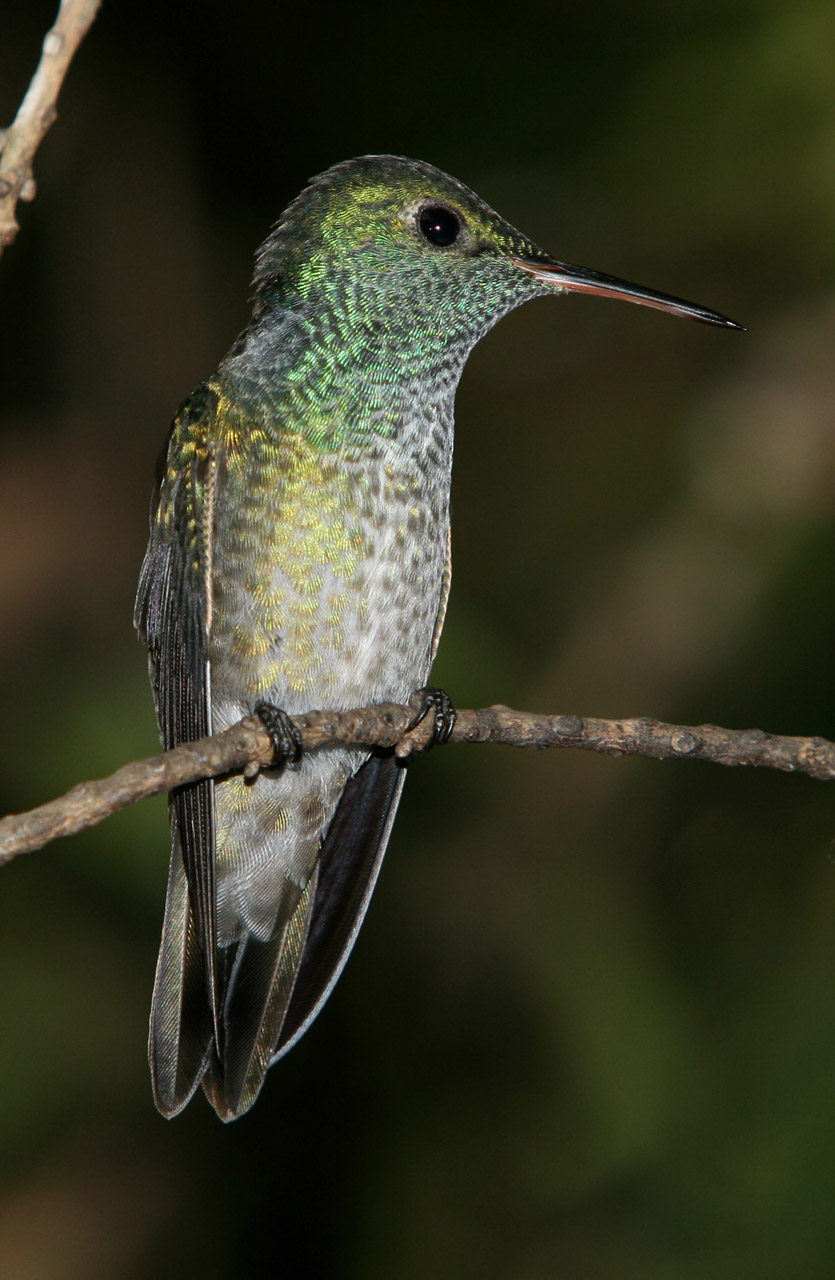
- Versicoloured emerald in Puerto Iguazú, Argentina

Conservation status
- Least Concern (IUCN 3.1)
- CITES Appendix II

Scientific classification
- Kingdom: Animalia
- Phylum: Chordata
- Class: Aves
- Clade: Strisores
- Order: Apodiformes
- Family: Trochilidae
- Genus: Chrysuronia
- Species: C. versicolor

Binomial name
- Chrysuronia versicolor (Vieillot, 1818)

Synonyms
- Agyrtria versicolor; Amazilia versicolor

= Versicolored emerald =

Species of bird

The versicoloured emerald (Chrysuronia versicolor) is a species of hummingbird from central and eastern South America.

== Taxonomy ==
The taxonomy is very complex and remains a matter of dispute. The nominate subspecies (C. v. versicolor) occurs in two main morphs; a white-throated coastal type and a green/turquoise-throated inland type. At some localities individuals with intermediate features are commonly seen, but at others the two morphs seemingly co-occur without signs of intergradation. The coastal morph was formerly known as C. brevirostris, but a review lead to this name being considered to belong to the white-chested emerald of northern South America. Recently, it has been suggested that the coastal type should remain as C. brevirostris, but this has been disputed, and has yet to gain wide recognition.

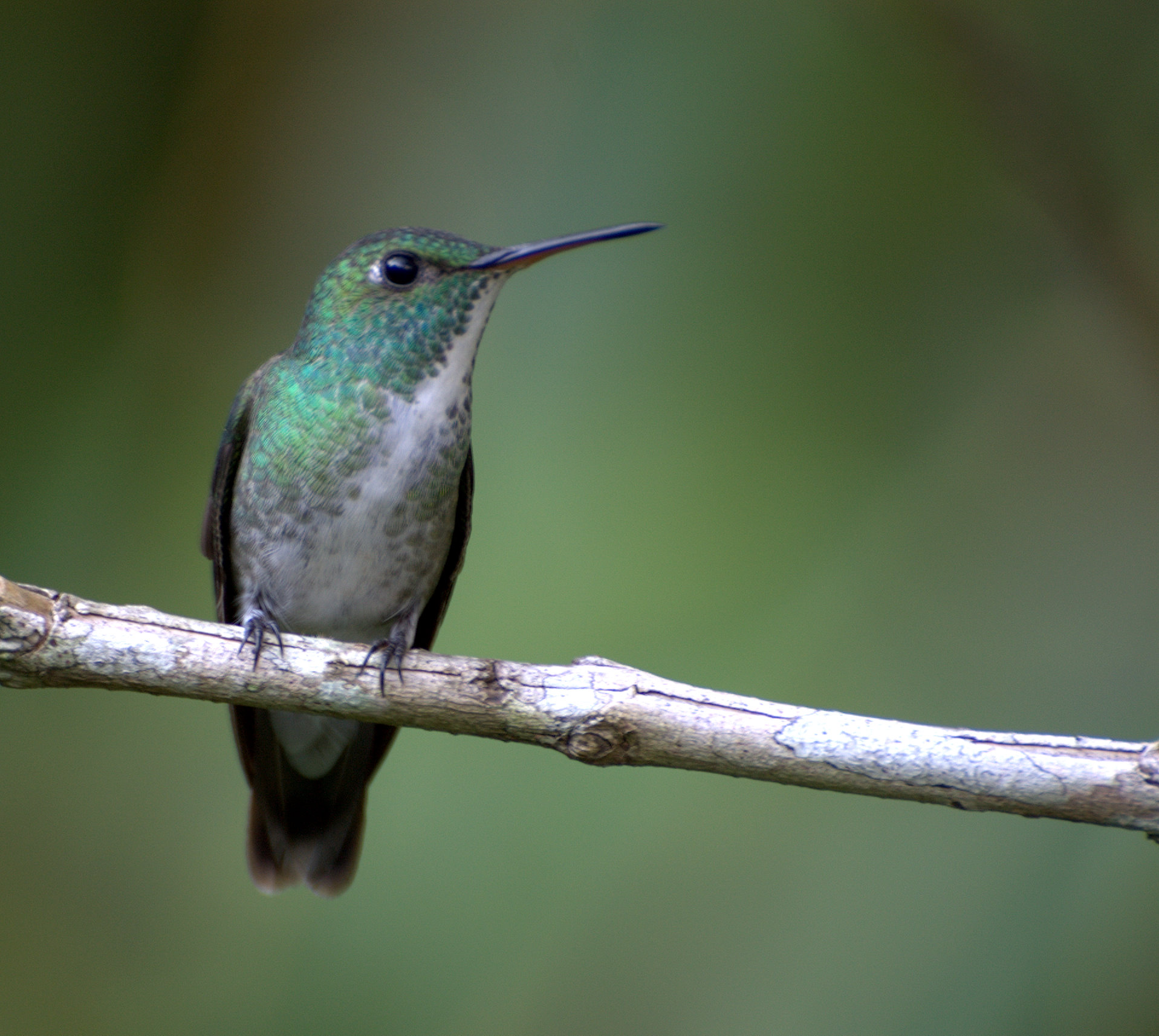
A coastal nominate from São Paulo, Brazil.

The exact distribution limits between several subspecies of the versicoloured emerald are poorly known, and, in addition to the coastal nominate, some other subspecies have been considered separate species, especially the blue-green emerald (C. (v.) rondoniae), also known as the Rondonia emerald. This was based on plumage and reported sympatry with C. versicolor (ssp?), but except for the blue to the head, C. v. rondoniae is very similar to C. v. nitidifrons, and any evidence for sympatry is lacking. It was therefore "de-listed" by the South American Classification Committee, and is now considered a subspecies of the versicolored emerald, with some even suggesting that rondoniae is entirely invalid.

This species was formerly placed in the genus Amazilia. A molecular phylogenetic study published in 2014 found that Amazilia was polyphyletic. In the revised classification to create monophyletic genera, the versicoloured emerald was moved to Chrysuronia.

== Description ==
It has a total length of 8–10 cm (3.1–3.9 in). The relatively long, slightly decurved bill is black with flesh-colored (occasionally orange) base to the lower mandible. The tail is coppery-green with a dark subterminal band. The upperparts and flanks are coppery-green. The central underparts and crissum (the undertail coverts surrounding the cloaca) are white. The color of the throat, face-sides and crown varies greatly both individually and depending on subspecies. The throat ranges from all greenish or turquoise (edged white in female) in inland nominate, nitidifrons and kubtcheki, to bluish in rondoniae and white (essentially a continuation of the white central underparts) in coastal nominate, hollandi and millerii. Most races have green face-sides and crown, but this is typically turquoise-blue or azure blue in hollandi and rondoniae.

== Distribution and habitat ==
It occurs in northern Bolivia, eastern Paraguay, far north-eastern Argentina, and eastern, southern and central Brazil, being absent from the arid Caatinga and most of the Amazon Basin, although locally extending into this region in the south-east and along major rivers (e.g. the Amazon River and Rio Negro). A population, possibly disjunct (although exact distribution limits often are incompletely known in this part of Brazil), occurs in far north-western Brazil, southern Venezuela, western Guyana and eastern Colombia.

It occurs in a wide range of semi-open habitats with some trees; even in urban areas. It generally avoids the interior of humid primary forest, and in regions where such habitats dominate, it mainly occurs in relatively open sections or along forest borders (e.g. the vicinity of major rivers). It is widespread, generally fairly common (more localized in the Amazon Basin) and possibly benefits from the widespread deforestation in tropical South America.
