= A. brevirostris =

A. brevirostris may refer to:

- Amazilia brevirostris, the white-chested emerald, a hummingbird species found in eastern Venezuela, the Guianas, Trinidad and far northern Brazil
- Anoiapithecus brevirostris, an extinct ape species that lived during the Miocene
