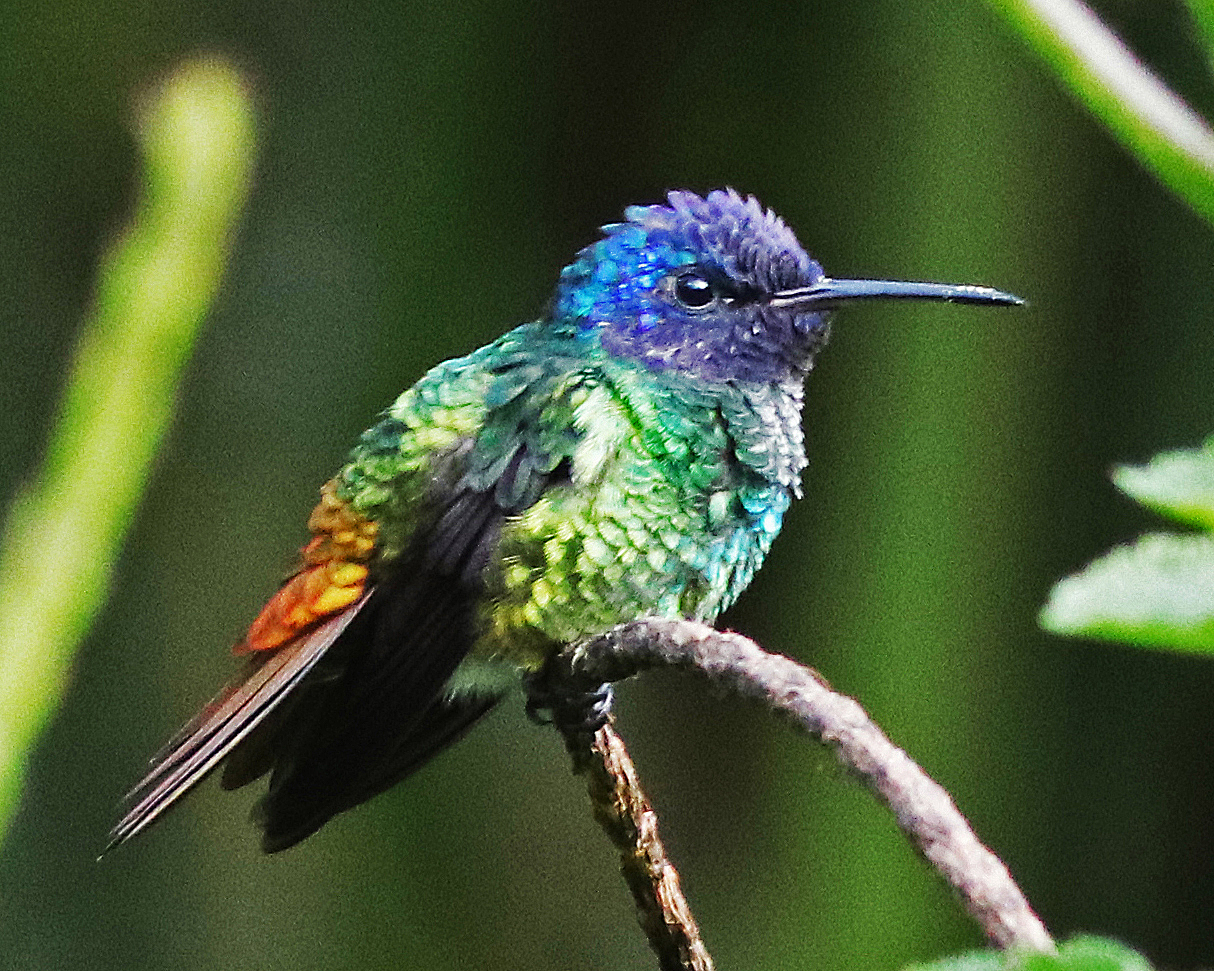
- Golden-tailed sapphire, (Chrysuronia oenone)

Scientific classification
- Kingdom: Animalia
- Phylum: Chordata
- Class: Aves
- Order: Apodiformes
- Family: Trochilidae
- Tribe: Trochilini
- Genus: Chrysuronia; Bonaparte, 1850

Type species
- Ornismya oenone (golden-tailed sapphire) Lesson, R, 1832

Species
- 10, see text

= Chrysuronia =

Genus of birds

Chrysuronia is a genus of hummingbirds in the family Trochilidae, all of which are native to Central and South America.

== Taxonomy ==
The genus Chrysuronia was introduced in 1850 by the French naturalist Charles Lucien Bonaparte. Bonaparte did not specify a type species but this was designated as the golden-tailed sapphire in 1855 by George Robert Gray. The genus name is a portmanteau of the specific names of two synonyms of the golden-tailed sapphire: Ornismya chrysura Lesson, R, 1832 and Ornismia oenone Lesson, 1832.

This genus formerly included only a single species, the golden-tailed sapphire. A molecular phylogenetic study published in 2014 found that the genera Amazilia and Lepidopyga were polyphyletic. In the revised classification to create monophyletic genera, Chrysuronia was broadened to include species that had previous been placed in Amazilia, Hylocharis and Lepidopyga.

The genus now contains ten species:

Genus Chrysuronia – Bonaparte, 1850 – ten species
Common name	Scientific name and subspecies	Range	Size and ecology	IUCN status and estimated population
Shining-green hummingbird Male Female	Chrysuronia goudoti (Bourcier, 1843) Four subspecies: C. g. luminosa (Lawrence, 1862); C. g. goudoti (Bourcier, 1843); C. g. zuliae (Cory, 1918); C. g. phaeochroa (Todd, 1942)	Colombia and Venezuela	Size: Habitat: Diet:	LC
Golden-tailed sapphire Male Female	Chrysuronia oenone (Lesson, R, 1832)	Bolivia, Brazil, Colombia, Ecuador, Peru, and Venezuela	Size: Habitat: Diet:	LC
Versicolored emerald Male	Chrysuronia versicolor (Vieillot, 1818)	northern Bolivia, eastern Paraguay, far north-eastern Argentina, and eastern, southern and central Brazil	Size: Habitat: Diet:	EN
Mangrove hummingbird	Chrysuronia boucardi (Mulsant, 1877)	Costa Rica.	Size: Habitat: Diet:	LC
Sapphire-throated hummingbird Male	Chrysuronia coeruleogularis (Gould, 1851) Three subspecies: C. c. coeruleogularis; C. c. coelina; C. c. conifis	Panama, Colombia, and more recently Costa Rica	Size: Habitat: Diet:	LC
Sapphire-bellied hummingbird	Chrysuronia lilliae (Stone, 1917)	Colombia	Size: Habitat: Diet:	EN
Humboldt's sapphire	Chrysuronia humboldtii (Bourcier & Mulsant, 1852)	Colombia, Ecuador, and Panama	Size: Habitat: Diet:	LC
Blue-headed sapphire	Chrysuronia grayi (Delattre & Bourcier, 1846)	Colombia and Ecuador.	Size: Habitat: Diet:	LC
White-chested emerald	Chrysuronia brevirostris (Lesson, R, 1829) Three subspecies: C. b. brevirostris; C. b. chionopectus; C. b. orienticola	Brazil, the Guianas, Trinidad, and Venezuela.	Size: Habitat: Diet:	LC
Plain-bellied emerald	Chrysuronia leucogaster (Gmelin, JF, 1788) Two subspecies: C. l. leucogaster (Gmelin, JF, 1788); C. l. bahiae (Hartert, E, 1899)	Brazil, the Guianas, and Venezuela.	Size: Habitat: Diet:	LC
