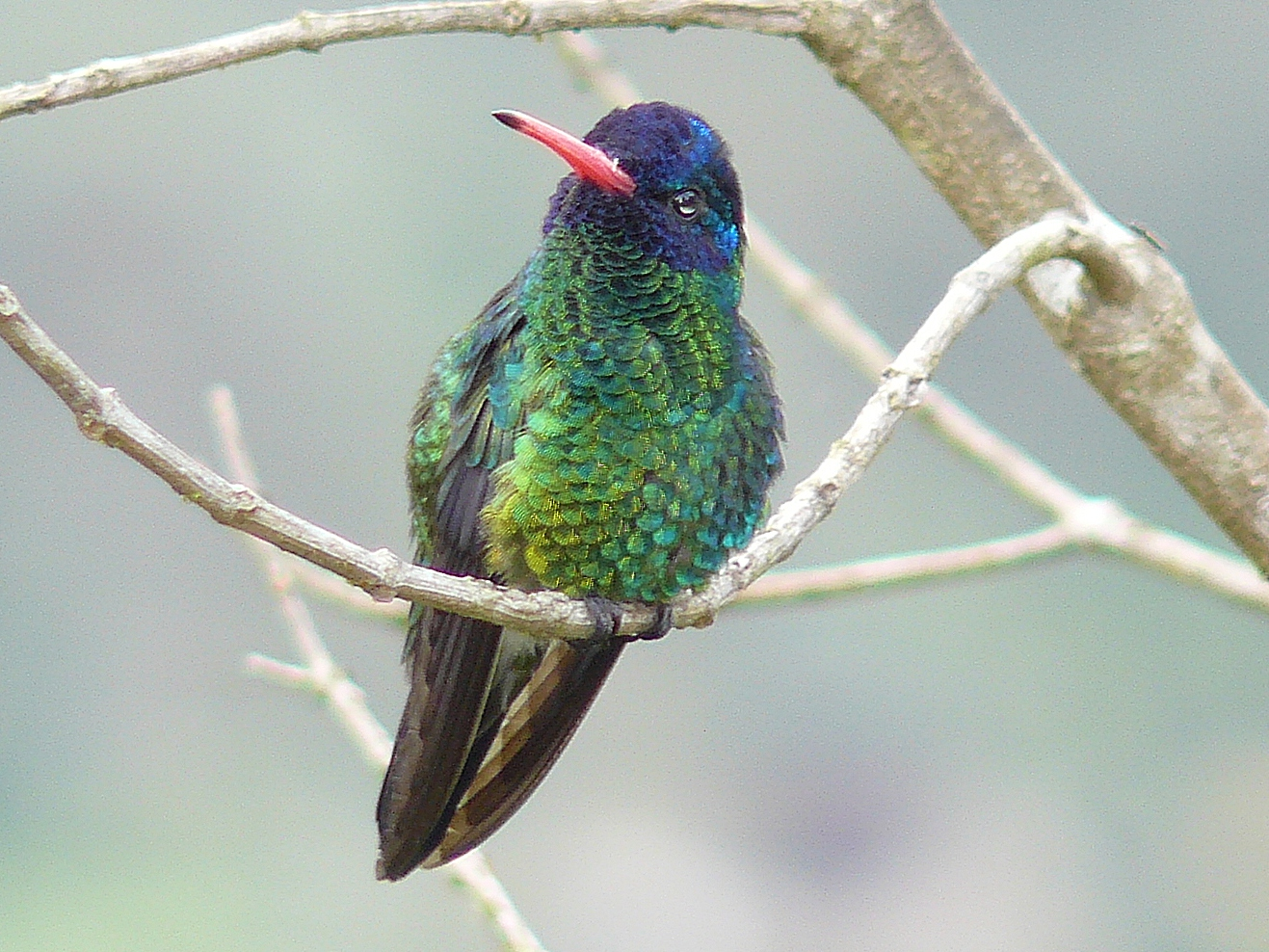
- Colombia

Conservation status
- Least Concern (IUCN 3.1)
- CITES Appendix II

Scientific classification
- Kingdom: Animalia
- Phylum: Chordata
- Class: Aves
- Order: Apodiformes
- Family: Trochilidae
- Genus: Chrysuronia
- Species: C. grayi

Binomial name
- Chrysuronia grayi (Delattre & Bourcier, 1846)

Synonyms
- Hylocharis grayi; Gray's hummingbird Amazilia grayi

Audio

= Blue-headed sapphire =

Species of hummingbird

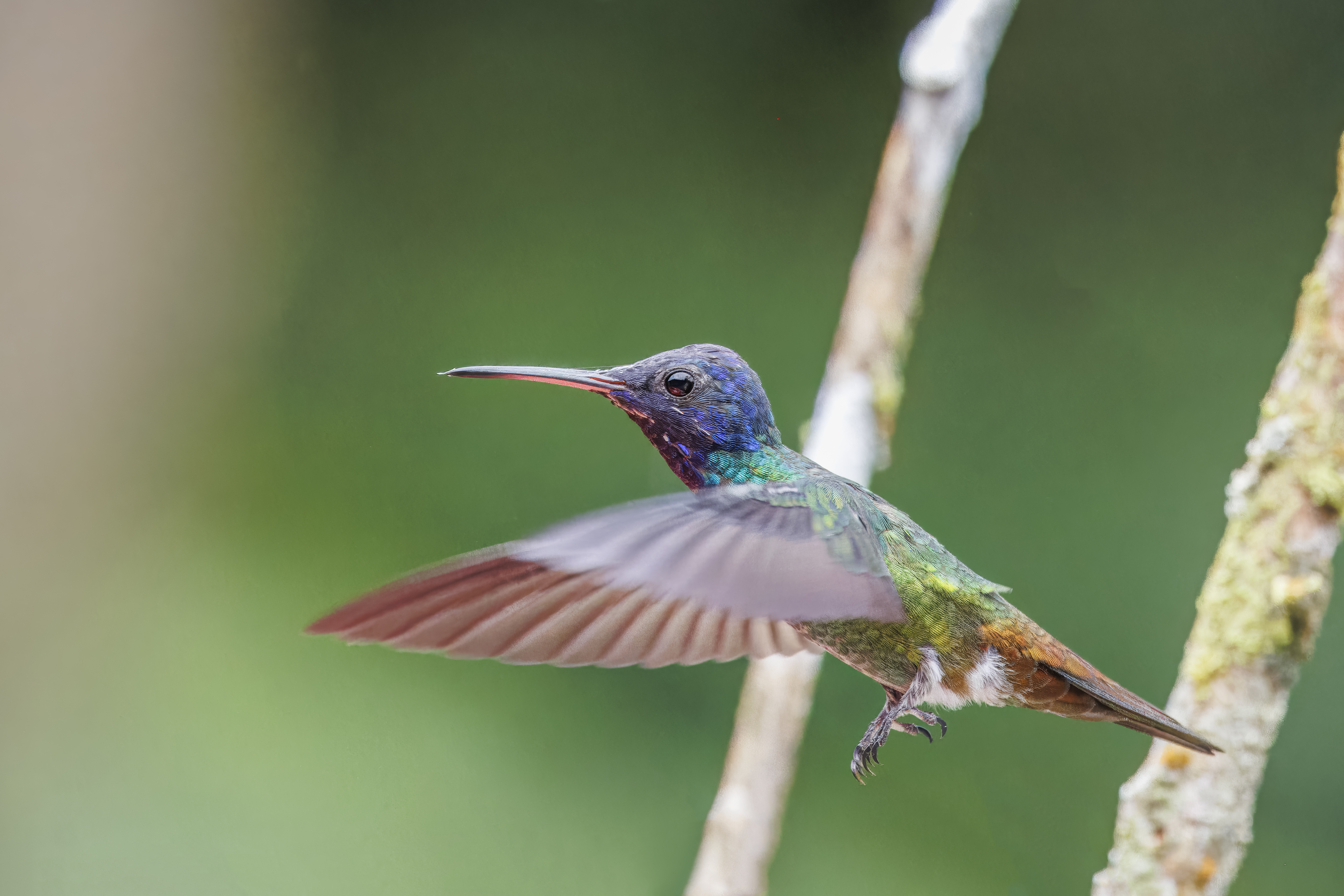
Flying in Ecuador

The Blue-headed sapphire or Gray's hummingbird (Chrysuronia grayi) is a species of hummingbird in the emerald's tribe Trochilini of subfamily Trochilidae. It is found in Colombia and Ecuador.

== Taxonomy and systematics ==
The blue-headed sapphire was formerly placed in the genera Hylocharis and Amazilia. It was moved by most taxonomic systems to Chrysuronia based on the results of a molecular phylogenetic study published in 2014. However, BirdLife International's Handbook of the Birds of the World (HBW) retains it in Amazilia.

The blue-headed sapphire is monotypic. However, at one time what is now Humboldt's sapphire (C. humboldtii) was treated as a subspecies of it.

== Description ==
The blue-headed sapphire is 9 to 11 cm (3.5 to 4.3 in) long. Males weigh 6.2 to 6.8 g (0.22 to 0.24 oz) and females 4.6 to 5.6 g (0.16 to 0.20 oz). Males have a straightish coral red bill with a black tip. Females' bills have a black maxilla with red at its base and a mostly pinkish mandible with a black tip. Adult males have a deep glittering blue upper throat, face, and crown. Their nape is dark blue-green and the rest of their upperparts metallic green. Their tail is dark steel blue. Their lower throat, breast, and upper belly are glittering emerald-green with a small area of white on the lower belly. Their undertail coverts are metallic green with dark grey edges. Adult females have metallic green to bronze-green upperparts. Their tail's base is dark bronze-green and the rest blue-black with greyish tips on the outer feathers. Their underparts are mostly dull white to greyish white with bronze-green on the sides of the throat and breast and some green flecks on the lower throat. Juvenile males have a dull bluish green face and crown, a bronzy green throat and breast, and a greyish white belly. Juvenile females are similar but duller and more bronzy overall.

== Distribution and habitat ==
The blue-headed sapphire is found in inter-Andean valleys from western Colombia's Valle del Cauca Department south into Ecuador's Pichincha Province. It inhabits dry scrublands, the edges of woodland and taller forest, and cultivated areas. In elevation it mostly ranges between about 500 and 2,000 m (1,600 and 6,600 ft) but can be found as high as 2,600 m (8,500 ft).

== Behaviour ==
=== Movement ===
The blue-headed sapphire is reported to make significant seasonal movements, but details are lacking.

=== Feeding ===
The blue-headed sapphire forages for nectar at a variety of flowering shrubs and trees. It sometimes defends feeding territories, and when several gather at the crown of a flowering tree they are "notably aggressive". In addition to nectar, it feeds on insects taken by hawking from a perch or by gleaning from vegetation.

=== Breeding ===
Blue-headed sapphires in breeding condition have been noted between November and April. No other information on the species' breeding phenology is known and its nest has not been described.

=== Vocalization ===
The blue-headed sapphire's song is "a repeated short-warbled phrase that starts with a squeaky 'tee' note, 'tee…teetlitlitsee-chup… teetlitlitsee-chup'." It also makes "short 'chip' notes and a high-pitched descending rattle."

== Status ==
The IUCN has assessed the blue-headed sapphire as being of Least Concern, though its population size is unknown and believed to be decreasing. No specific threats have been identified. It appears "able to use more or less extensively altered, open or cultivated areas" though much of its native habitat has been converted to agriculture.
