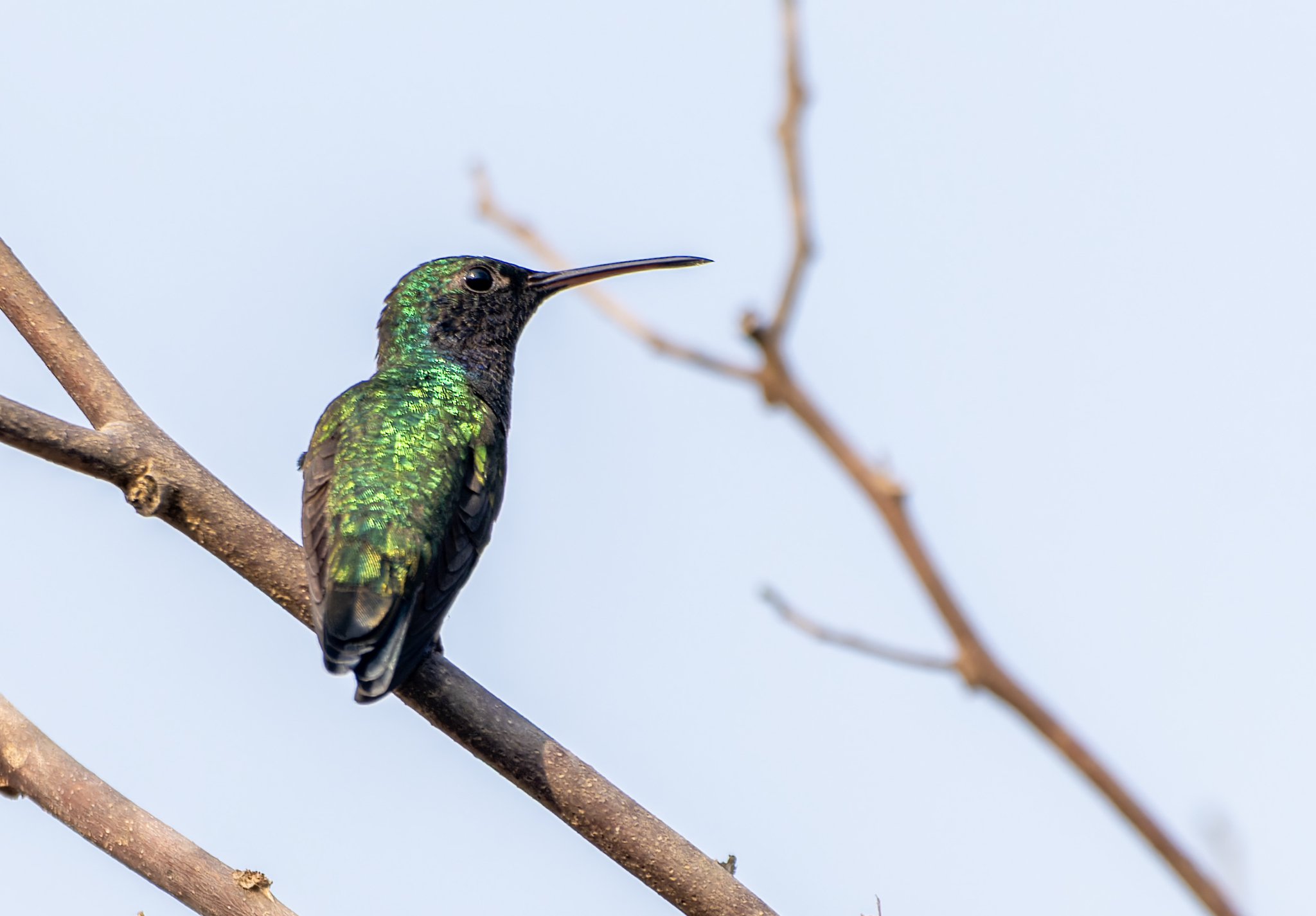

Conservation status
- Endangered (IUCN 3.1)
- CITES Appendix II

Scientific classification
- Kingdom: Animalia
- Phylum: Chordata
- Class: Aves
- Clade: Strisores
- Order: Apodiformes
- Family: Trochilidae
- Genus: Chrysuronia
- Species: C. lilliae

Binomial name
- Chrysuronia lilliae (Stone, 1917)

Synonyms
- Lepidopyga lilliae; Amazilia lilliae

= Sapphire-bellied hummingbird =

Species of hummingbird endemic to Colombia

The sapphire-bellied hummingbird (Chrysuronia lilliae) is an Endangered species of hummingbird in the "emeralds", tribe Trochilini of subfamily Trochilinae. It is endemic to Colombia.

== Taxonomy and systematics ==
The sapphire-bellied hummingbird was formerly placed in the genera Lepidopyga and Amazilia. A molecular phylogenetic study published in 2014 found that both genera were polyphyletic. In the revised classification to create monophyletic genera, the sapphire-bellied hummingbird was moved by most taxonomic systems to Chrysuronia. However, BirdLife International's Handbook of the Birds of the World (HBW) retains it in Amazilia. At times the species has been treated as a subspecies of the sapphire-throated hummingbird (C. coeruleogularis).

The sapphire-bellied hummingbird is monotypic.

== Description ==
The sapphire-bellied hummingbird is 8.9 to 9.4 cm (3.5 to 3.7 in) long. Males weigh about 4.3 g (0.15 oz). Males' bills have a black maxilla and a black-tipped pinkish mandible. They have a shining green crown, back, and rump and their tail is forked and blue-black. They have a glittering purple gorget and the rest of their underparts are glittering blue. The female's weight has not been documented nor its plumage described, though the latter is thought to be similar to the male's but grayer on the underparts.

== Distribution and habitat ==
The sapphire-bellied hummingbird is found only in the mangroves of Ciénaga Grande de Santa Marta, a coastal wetland in northern Colombia, and in immediately adjoining arid scrublands.

== Behavior ==
=== Movement ===
The sapphire-bellied hummingbird's movements, if any, have not been documented, though it might make local seasonal movements.

=== Feeding ===
The sapphire-bellied hummingbird's preferred nectar source is the flowers of tea mangrove (Pelliciera rhizophorae), though it has been observed feeding at the flowering legume Erythrina fusca in the nearby arid scrub. In addition to nectar, it feeds on insects.

=== Breeding ===
Nothing is known about the sapphire-bellied hummingbird's breeding phenology.

=== Vocalization ===
Xeno-canto and Cornell University's Macaulay Library have only a few recordings of the sapphire-bellied hummingbird's vocalizations. They are described as "a series of short chatters".

== Status ==
The IUCN originally assessed the sapphire-bellied hummingbird as Critically Endangered but in 2021 downlisted it to Endangered. It has a very small area of suitable habitat which is undergoing continuing destruction. Its population is estimated at between 285 and 440 mature individuals and believed to be decreasing. Though it occurs in two protected areas, there are very few records at one of them, Vía Parque Isla de Salamanca.
