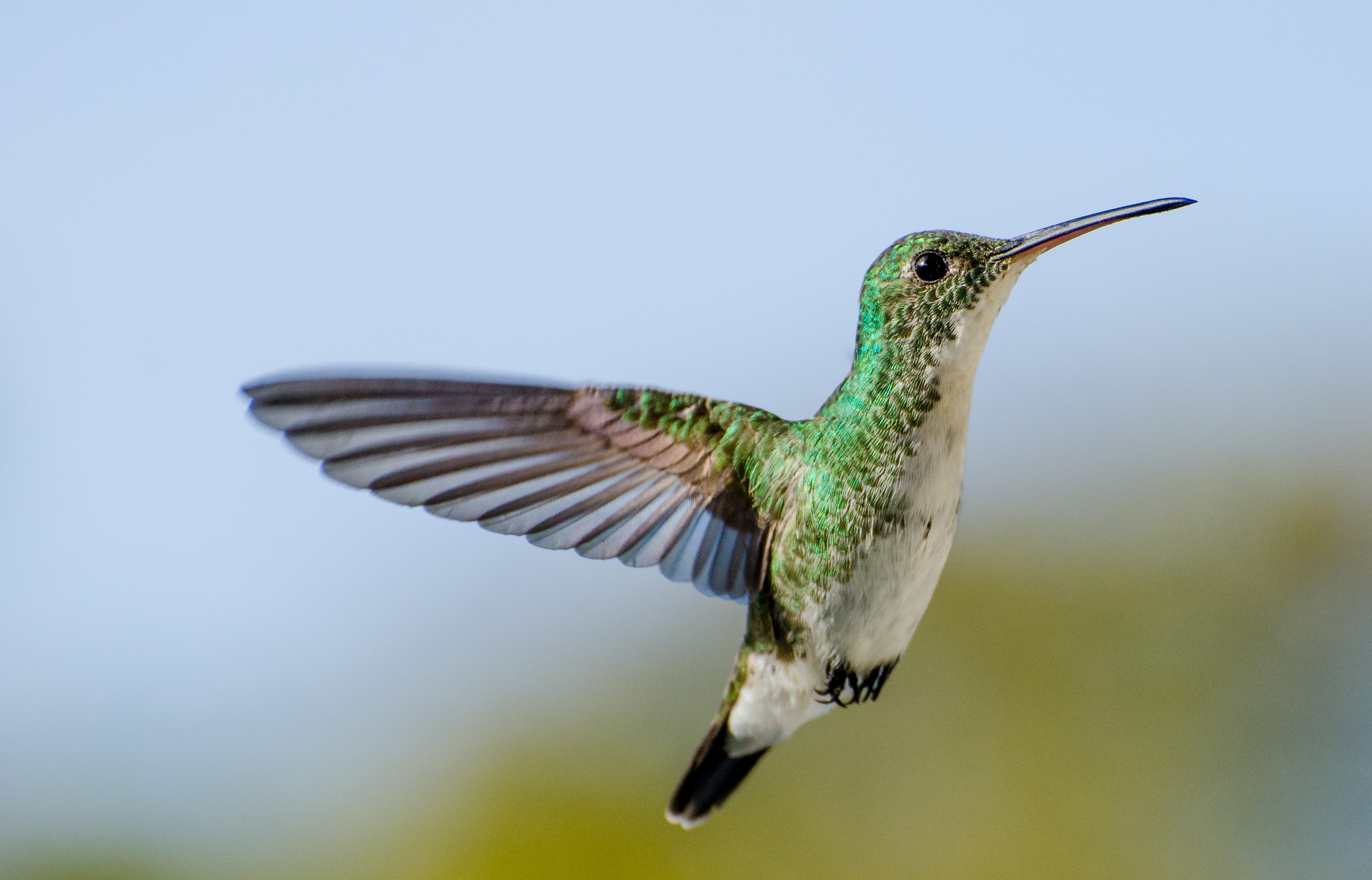

Conservation status
- Least Concern (IUCN 3.1)
- CITES Appendix II

Scientific classification
- Kingdom: Animalia
- Phylum: Chordata
- Class: Aves
- Order: Apodiformes
- Family: Trochilidae
- Genus: Chrysuronia
- Species: C. leucogaster

Binomial name
- Chrysuronia leucogaster (Gmelin, JF, 1788)

Synonyms
- Agyrtria leucogaster; Amazilia leucogaster

= Plain-bellied emerald =

Species of hummingbird

The plain-bellied emerald (Chrysuronia leucogaster) is a species of hummingbird in the "emeralds", tribe Trochilini of subfamily Trochilinae. It is found in Brazil, the Guianas, and Venezuela.

== Taxonomy and systematics ==
The plain-bellied emerald was formally described in 1788 by the German naturalist Johann Friedrich Gmelin in his revised and expanded edition of Carl Linnaeus's Systema Naturae. He placed it with all the other hummingbirds in the genus Trochilus and coined the binomial name Trochilus leucogaster. The species had been described and illustrated by the French naturalists Mathurin Jacques Brisson in 1760 and Georges-Louis Leclerc, Comte de Buffon in 1779. Gmelin did not specify a type locality but this was designated as Cayenne, French Guiana, by Hans von Berlepsch in 1908.

The plain-bellied emerald was for a time placed in the genus Agyrtria and then in Amazilia. A molecular phylogenetic study published in 2014 found that Amazilia was polyphyletic. In the revised classification to create monophyletic genera, the plain-bellied emerald was moved by most taxonomic systems to Chrysuronia. However, BirdLife International's Handbook of the Birds of the World retains it in Amazilia.

The genus Chrysuronia had been introduced in 1850 by the French naturalist Charles Lucien Bonaparte. The name is a portmanteau of the specific names of two synonyms of the golden-tailed sapphire: Ornismya chrysura Lesson, R, 1832 and Ornismia oenone Lesson, 1832. The specific epithet leucogaster is from Ancient Greek leukos meaning "white" and gastēr meaning "belly".

Two subspecies are recognised:

- C. l. leucogaster (Gmelin, JF, 1788)
- C. l. bahiae (Hartert, E, 1899)

Some taxonomists have questioned the bahiae is a separate subspecies.

== Description ==
The plain-bellied emerald is 9 to 10 cm (3.5 to 3.9 in) long. Males weigh 4 to 4.5 g (0.14 to 0.16 oz) and females about 4.3 g (0.15 oz). Adults have a short, straight to slightly decurved, blackish bill with a red base to the mandible. Adult males of the nominate subspecies C. l. leucogaster have a glittering green crown and sides of the neck. The rest of its upperparts, flanks, and sides of the throat are golden- to bronze-green. The center of its throat and underparts are white. Its inner tail feathers are bronze-green to bronze and the outer ones bluish black. Adult females are similar to the male but have greenish spots on the sides of the throat and grayish green tips to the tail feathers. Immatures resemble the adult female with the addition of brownish edges to the feathers of the back. Subspecies C. l. bahiae is very similar to the nominate but less bronzy.

== Distribution and habitat ==
The plain-bellied emerald's two subspecies have disjunct distributions, though both are coastal. The nominate is found from northeastern Venezuela through Guyana, Suriname, and French Guiana into northeastern Brazil as far as Piauí state. C. l. bahiae is found in eastern Brazil from Pernambuco south through Alagoas, Sergipe, and Bahia slightly into Espírito Santo. The species inhabits a variety of semi-open to open landscapes including mangrove, the edges of mature forest, secondary forest, cerrado, caatinga, and human-created areas like plantations, parks, and gardens. It is mostly found near sea level but in Venezuela is found as high as 250 m (800 ft).

== Behavior ==
=== Movement ===
The plain-bellied emerald is mostly sedentary but some local dispersal has been noted.

=== Feeding ===
The plain-bellied emerald forages for nectar at a variety of flowering plants, shrubs, and trees; species in at least eleven families are known to be sources. It tends to stay near the ground and defends feeding territories. In addition to nectar it feeds on insects captured by hawking from a perch.

=== Breeding ===
The plain-bellied emerald's breeding season in the Guianas includes July and August, and it spans from October to February in northeastern Brazil. It makes a cup nest of plant down and leaves with lichen on the outside. It typically places it on a horizontal branch or in a fork within about 5 m (20 ft) of the ground. The female incubates the clutch of two eggs for about 14 days and fledging occurs 20 to 25 days after hatch.

=== Vocalization ===
What is thought to be the plain-bellied emerald's song is "a long series of repeated single 'pseeee' notes". It also makes calls described as "a thin 'tsink' and a high-pitched stuttering series".

== Status ==
The IUCN has assessed the plain-bellied emerald as being of Least Concern, though its population size and trend are not known. No immediate threats have been identified. It is described as "a rather common resident" in the northern part of its range but is not as well known in eastern Brazil.
