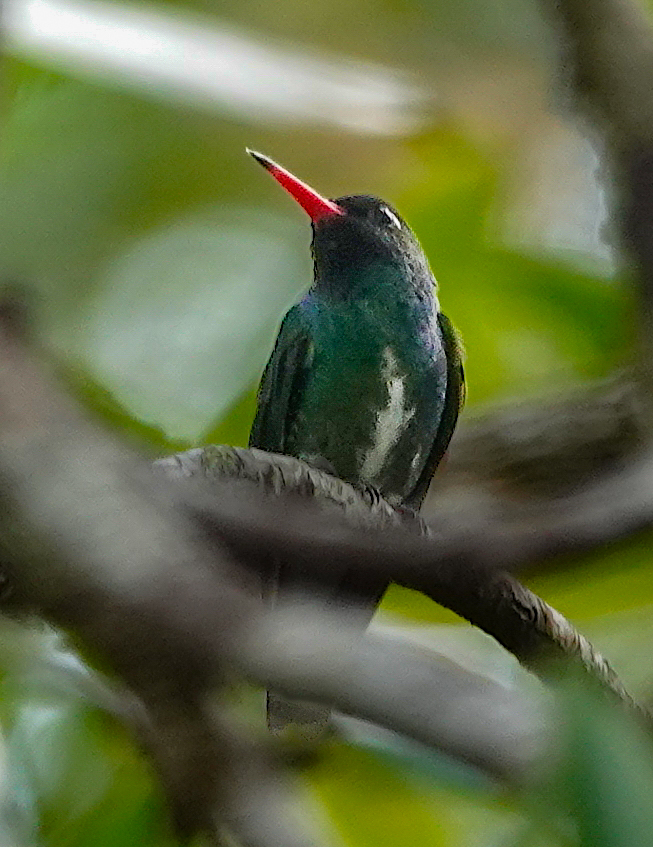

Conservation status
- Least Concern (IUCN 3.1)
- CITES Appendix II

Scientific classification
- Kingdom: Animalia
- Phylum: Chordata
- Class: Aves
- Order: Apodiformes
- Family: Trochilidae
- Genus: Chrysuronia
- Species: C. humboldtii

Binomial name
- Chrysuronia humboldtii (Bourcier & Mulsant, 1852)

Synonyms
- Hylocharis grayi humboldtii; Hylocharis humboldtii; Amazilia humboldtii

= Humboldt's sapphire =

Species of hummingbird

Humboldt's sapphire or Humboldt's hummingbird (Chrysuronia humboldtii) is a species of hummingbird in the "emeralds", tribe Trochilini of subfamily Trochilinae. It is found in Colombia, Ecuador, and Panama.

== Taxonomy and systematics ==
Humboldt's sapphire was formerly placed in the genera Hylocharis and Amazilia. It was moved by most taxonomic systems to Chrysuronia based on the results of a molecular phylogenetic study published in 2014. However, BirdLife International's Handbook of the Birds of the World (HBW) retains it in Amazilia. At one time the species was treated as a subspecies of the blue-headed hummingbird (C. grayi).

Humboldt's sapphire is monotypic.

== Description ==
Humboldt's sapphire is 9 to 12.5 cm (3.5 to 4.9 in) long. Males weigh 6.3 to 6.6 g (0.22 to 0.23 oz) and females 5.8 to 6.4 g (0.20 to 0.23 oz). Males have a straightish coral red bill with a black tip. Females' bills have a black maxilla with red at its base and a mostly pinkish mandible with a black tip. Adult males have a deep blue forehead and center of the throat. Their crown is dull dark blue-green and the rest of their upperparts metallic green to bronze-green. Their tail is dark metallic green to blue with dusky gray tips on the outer feathers. Their chest, sides of the neck, and cheeks are blue-green to green, their sides green, and the center of their belly and their undertail coverts white. Adult females have a blue crown and metallic green to bronze-green upperparts and tail; their outer tail feathers have dusky gray tips. Their underparts are mostly white with bright green flecks on the sides of the throat and breast. Juvenile males have much white below, with a bronze-flecked breast, and their crown and face are dull dark bluish green.

== Distribution and habitat ==
Humboldt's sapphire is found in a narrow Pacific coastal band from extreme southeastern Panama through western Colombia into northwestern Ecuador's Esmeraldas Province. It inhabits mangroves and adjacent wet secondary forest, mostly below 50 m (160 ft) of elevation. It is most common in stands of Pacific (or tea) mangrove (Pelliciera rhizophorae).

== Behavior ==
=== Movement ===
The movements of Humboldt's sapphire, if any, have not been documented.

=== Feeding ===
The Humboldt's sapphire's preferred nectar source is the flowers of tea mangrove, though it has been observed feeding at flowering trees, shrubs, and herbs near the mangrove belt. In addition to nectar, it feeds on insects taken by hawking from a perch or by gleaning from vegetation.

=== Breeding ===
Humboldt's sapphires in breeding condition have been noted between January and May. Males gather at leks to sing to females. No other information on the species' breeding phenology is known and its nest has not been described.

=== Vocalization ===
Xeno-canto and Cornell University's Macaulay Library have only a few recordings of Humboldt's sapphire vocalizations. What is thought to be its song is "a repeated high-pitched phrase comprising hissing notes and trills, 'tee-tsee-see-tsee-see-trtrt-tsee-see-trtrt'." It also makes "a descending squeaky twittering" call.

== Status ==
The IUCN has assessed Humboldt's sapphire as being of Least Concern. It has a fairly large range and an estimated population of between 20,000 and 50,000 mature individuals, though the latter is believed to be decreasing. Its mangrove habitat is slowly being converted to shrimp farming, but because the species also uses secondary forest the population's rate of decline is not high enough for a Near Threatened assessment. It is considered uncommon in Panama, very local in Colombia, and very rare in Ecuador.
