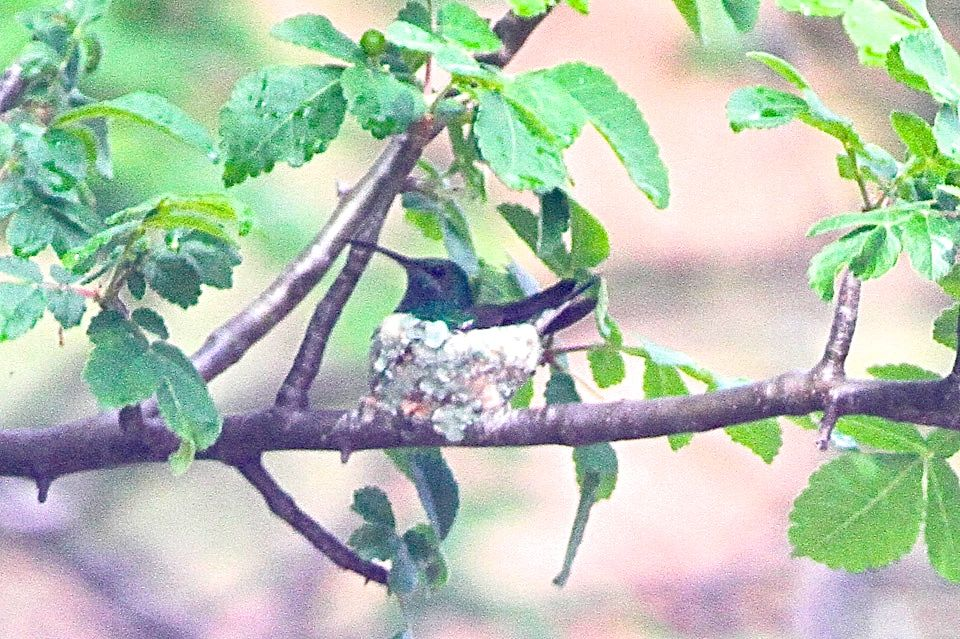

Conservation status
- Least Concern (IUCN 3.1)
- CITES Appendix II

Scientific classification
- Kingdom: Animalia
- Phylum: Chordata
- Class: Aves
- Clade: Strisores
- Order: Apodiformes
- Family: Trochilidae
- Genus: Chrysuronia
- Species: C. goudoti

Binomial name
- Chrysuronia goudoti (Bourcier, 1843)
- Range of L. goudoti

Synonyms
- Sapphironia goudoti; Amazilia goudoti

= Shining-green hummingbird =

The shining-green hummingbird (Chrysuronia goudoti) is a species of hummingbird in the "emeralds", tribe Trochilini of subfamily Trochilinae. It is found in Colombia and Venezuela.

== Taxonomy and systematics ==
The shining-green hummingbird was formerly placed in the genus Lepidopyga. A molecular phylogenetic study published in 2014 found that Lepidopyga was polyphyletic. In the revised classification to create monophyletic genera, the shining-green hummingbird was moved by most taxonomic systems to Chrysuronia. However, BirdLife International's Handbook of the Birds of the World (HBW) retains it in Amazilia.

These four subspecies of shining-green hummingbird are recognized:

- C. g. luminosa (Lawrence, 1862)
- C. g. goudoti (Bourcier, 1843)
- C. g. zuliae (Cory, 1918)
- C. g. phaeochroa (Todd, 1942)

Subspecies C. g. luminosa has at times been treated as a separate species.

== Description ==
The shining-green hummingbird is 9 to 9.5 cm (3.5 to 3.7 in) long. Males weigh about 4.1 g (0.14 oz) and females about 3.7 g (0.13 oz). Both sexes of all subspecies have a straightish bill with a black maxilla and a mostly pink mandible. Adult males of the nominate subspecies C. g. goudoti have green upperparts. Their underparts are mostly shining bluish green with a whitish belly and green undertail coverts with white edges. Their tail is forked; its central feathers are bronze-black and the outer ones blue-black. Adult females' upperparts are like the male's. Their underparts' feathers have white bases and edges that give the lower breast a spotty look. Their belly is almost pure white and their undertail coverts white with some green. Their tail is less deeply forked than the male's and more bronzy or greenish than black. Juveniles are duller green above than adults and have dusky edges on the crown and nape feathers. They are mostly dull bronzy green with grayish-white feather edges below and have a grayish white belly.

Males of subspecies C. g. luminosa are more bronzy above and golden-green below than the nominate. Females have less white on their belly and undertail coverts. C. g. zuliae is smaller than the nominate. It has a darker crown, less bronzy upperparts, and less white on the undertail coverts. C. g. phaeochroa males compared to the nominate are darker above, more bluish green below, and have a bluer crown.

== Distribution and habitat ==
The subspecies of shining-green hummingbird are found thus:

- C. g. luminosa, northern Colombia from Chocó Department to Bolívar and Cesar departments
- C. g. goudoti, central Colombia's middle and upper Magdalena River Valley
- C. g. zuliae, northern and western Lake Maracaibo basin in extreme northeastern Colombia and northwestern Venezuela
- C. g. phaeochroa, southern and eastern Maracaibo basin of northwestern Venezuela

The shining-green hummingbird inhabits open landscapes such as brushy areas with scattered trees, arid to moist scrublands, the edges of gallery forest, coffee plantations, and gardens. In Colombia it ranges mostly from sea level to 1,000 m (3,300 ft) but is found as high as 1,600 m (5,200 ft). In Venezuela it occurs from sea level up to 800 m (2,600 ft).

== Behavior ==
=== Movement ===
The shining-green hummingbird is mostly sedentary but some seasonal elevational dispersal is suspected.

=== Feeding ===
The shining-green hummingbird forages for nectar at a wide variety of flowering plants. A study in Cesar, Colombia, documented 22 species of at least nine families. It sometimes gathers at flowering trees in "noisy, quarrelsome assemblages". In addition to nectar it feeds on arthropods captured by hawking from a perch and by gleaning from the crowns of trees.

=== Breeding ===
The shining-green hummingbird's breeding season spans from October to March. Its nest is a small cup of plant down and cobweb with lichens on the outside. It is typically placed on an outer branch of a tree or shrub between 1 and 1.5 m (3 and 5 ft) above the ground. Nothing else is known about the species' breeding phenology.

=== Vocalization ===
What is thought to be the shining-green hummingbird's song is "a short, thin ‘lisping’ rattle initiated with an upslurred note...rapidly repeated 10–12 times, 'pee-rrrr..pee-rrrr..peer-rrrr..'." Its calls include "chips and a high-pitched descending trill."

== Status ==
The IUCN has assessed the shining-green hummingbird as being of Least Concern. It has a large range, and though its population size is unknown it is believed to be increasing. No immediate threats have been identified. It is considered locally common in most of its range and has possibly benefitted from deforestation.
