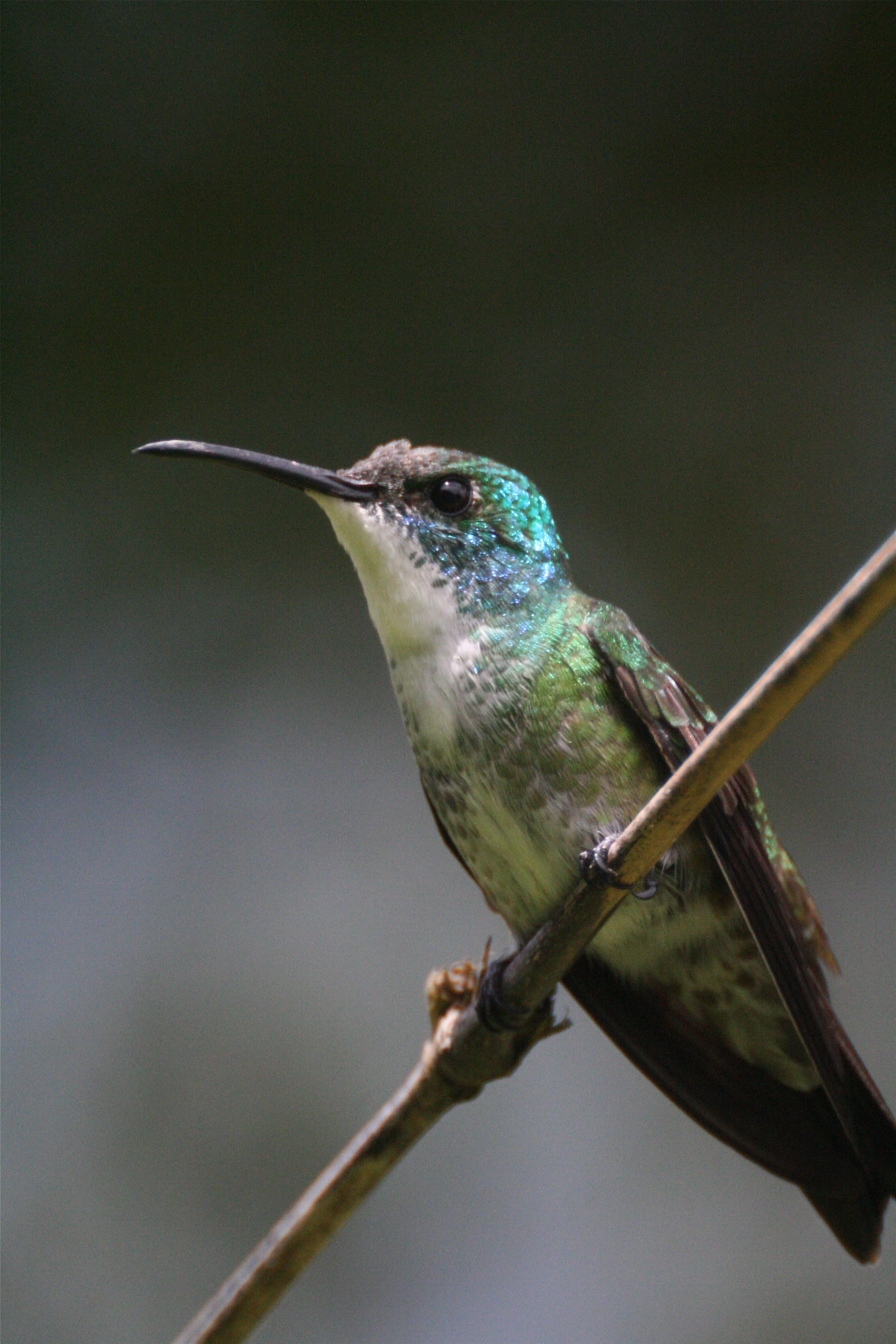

Conservation status
- Least Concern (IUCN 3.1)
- CITES Appendix II

Scientific classification
- Kingdom: Animalia
- Phylum: Chordata
- Class: Aves
- Order: Apodiformes
- Family: Trochilidae
- Genus: Chrysuronia
- Species: C. brevirostris

Binomial name
- Chrysuronia brevirostris (Lesson, R, 1829)
- White-chested emerald range

Synonyms
- Amazilia chionopectus, Agyrtria brevirostris, Amazilia brevirostris

= White-chested emerald =

Species of hummingbird

The white-chested emerald (Chrysuronia brevirostris) is a hummingbird in the "emeralds", tribe Trochilini of subfamily Trochilinae. It is found in Brazil, the Guianas, Trinidad, and Venezuela.

== Taxonomy and systematics ==
The white-chested emerald's taxonomic history is complex. The species was previously known in succession as Amazilia chionopectus, Agyrtria brevirostris, and Amazilia brevirostris. A molecular phylogenetic study published in 2014 found that Amazilia was polyphyletic. In the revised classification to create monophyletic genera, the white-chested emerald was moved by most taxonomic systems to Chrysuronia. However, BirdLife International's Handbook of the Birds of the World retains it in Amazilia.

The white-chested emerald has three subspecies, the nominate C. b. brevirostris, C. b. chionopectus, and C. b. orienticola.

== Description ==
The white-chested emerald is 9 to 10 cm (3.5 to 3.9 in) long. Males weigh about 4.6 g (0.16 oz) and females 4.4 g (0.16 oz). Adults of both sexes of all subspecies have a short, straight, blackish bill and the sexes are almost alike in plumage. The nominate subspecies has iridescent turquoise-green crown and cheeks and shining bronze-green upperparts that become coppery on the rump. Its central tail feathers are coppery and the outer ones bronze to copperish with blackish bars near the end of their underside. Its underside from throat to belly is white with bronze-green sides and flanks. Its undertail coverts are golden-green with white edges. The female differs from the male only by having grayish tips on the outer tail feathers. Juveniles resemble adult females with a yellowish to reddish base on their mandible.

Subspecies C. b. chionopectus is significantly larger than the other two subspecies but has the same plumage as the nominate. C. b. orienticola is similar to the nominate but has darker, more bronze colored, upperparts and flanks.

== Distribution and habitat ==
The nominate subspecies of white-chested emerald is the most widespread. It is found in eastern Venezuela, Guyana, Suriname, and extreme northern Brazil's Roraima state. C. b. chionopectus occurs only on Trinidad and C. b. orienticola only in coastal French Guiana. The species inhabits a variety of landscapes including rainforest; semi-deciduous, gallery, and secondary forests; scrublands; savanna; and some cultivated areas. C. b. chionopectus favors more open landscapes including cacao plantations. There are very few specimens or sightings of C. b. orienticola, and all are from coastal areas.

== Behavior ==
=== Movement ===
Most populations of white-chested emerald are thought to be sedentary but data are lacking.

=== Feeding ===
The white-chested emerald forages for nectar at a variety of flowering plants and trees; species in at least nine families are known to be sources. In addition to nectar it feeds on insects captured by hawking from a perch or by gleaning from vegetation.

=== Breeding ===
The white-chested emerald's breeding season includes at least December to April. It makes a cup nest of plant fibers with lichen on the outside and typically places it on a horizontal branch between 1 and 7 m (3 and 20 ft) above the ground. The female incubates the clutch of two eggs but the period is not known; fledging occurs about 20 days after hatch.

=== Vocalization ===
The white-chested emerald's song is variable but always "nasal and squeaky". Some typical phrases are described as "tsri-lee … tsri-lee ... tsri-lee", "tee-tink-tink-tink .. tsee-tink ... tee-tink-tink-tink … tsee-tink ...", or "teee-tjitjitjitjitji ..... teee-tjitjitjitjitji...".

== Status ==
The IUCN has assessed the white-chested emerald as being of Least Concern. It has a large range but its population size and trend are not known. It is one of the most common hummingbirds on Trinidad, but the mainland population has not been well studied and its abundance across its distribution is not known. C. b. orienticola is hardly known and appears to be very rare.
