= List of birds of Trinidad and Tobago =

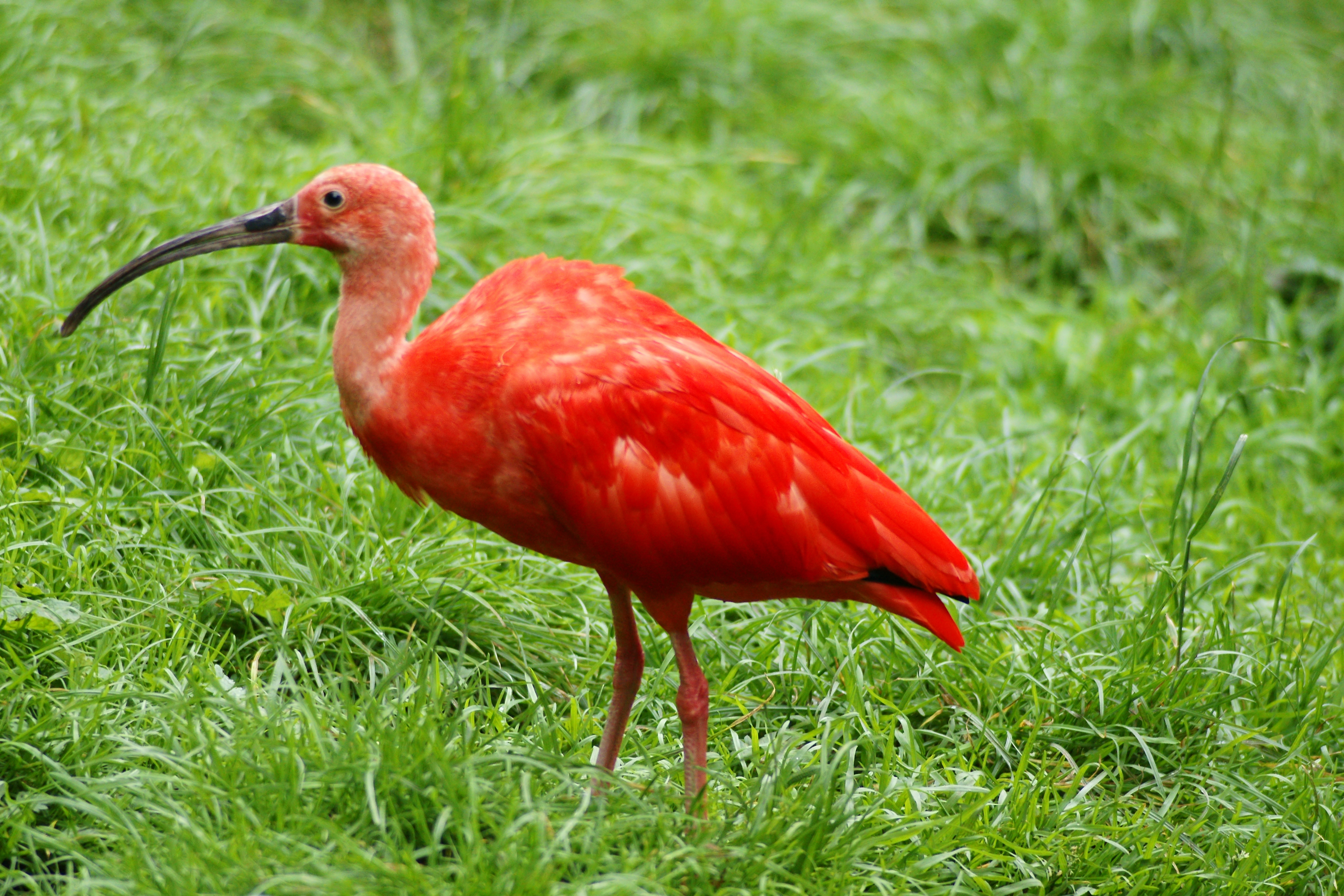

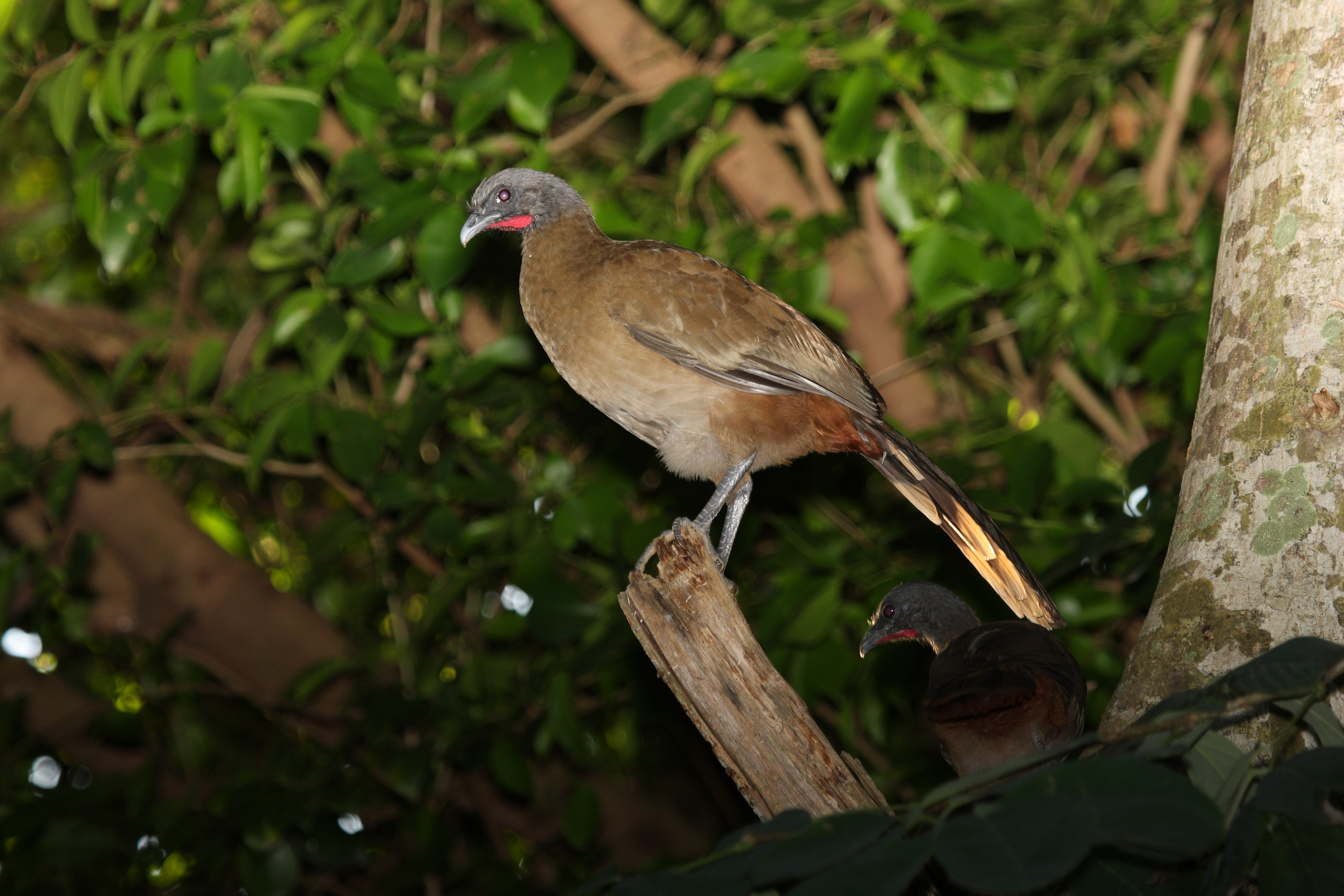
The scarlet ibis (above) and rufous-vented chachalaca (below) are the national birds of Trinidad and Tobago.

The South American Classification Committee (SACC) lists 489 species of birds that have been confirmed on the islands of Trinidad and Tobago as of February 2026. Of them, two are endemic, seven have been introduced by humans, 131 are rare or vagrants, 11 have been extirpated, and the status of one is not known. The origin of one species (vagrant or introduced) is uncertain. As of December 2023 the Trinidad & Tobago Bird Status & Distribution Committee (BSDC) did not recognize three of them and had added nine, all of them vagrants.

There are few places in the world where so many bird species can be seen in such a small area, many of them unique, very rare, or of particular interest. They range from the many species of hummingbird to the cave-dwelling oilbird (which uses echo-location to fly in the dark) and the scarlet ibis.

The islands are within a few miles of Venezuela, and the species are therefore typical of tropical South America. However, the number of species is relatively low compared to the mainland, as would be expected on small islands. The resident breeding birds are augmented in the northern winter by migrants from North America, although the variety of migrant passerines is very limited compared to Central America.

Unless noted otherwise, the list of species is that of the SACC with distribution notes by the BSDC. The list's taxonomic treatment (sequence of orders, families, and species) and nomenclature (common and scientific names) are also those of the SACC. Capitalization within English names follows Wikipedia practice, i.e. only the first word of a name is capitalized unless a place name such as São Paulo is used.

Species in the list are common on both main islands except as indicated otherwise. Many are also present on other, small, islands which are usually not named in the list. Tobago has only about half the number of bird species of Trinidad, but several species and subspecies have occurred only on the smaller island. Some of the smaller islands off Tobago, such as Little Tobago, have important seabird breeding colonies.

== Tinamous ==
Order: Tinamiformes Family: Tinamidae

The tinamous are one of the most ancient groups of bird. Although they look similar to other ground-dwelling birds like quail and grouse, they have no close relatives and are classified as a single family, Tinamidae, within their own order, the Tinamiformes.

Name	Binomial	Status
Little tinamou	Crypturellus soui	Trinidad only

== Screamers ==
Order: Anseriformes Family: Anhimidae

The screamers are a small family of birds related to the ducks. They are large, bulky birds, with a small downy head, long legs and large feet which are only partially webbed. They have large spurs on their wings which are used in fights over mates and in territorial disputes.

Name	Binomial	Status
Horned screamer	Anhima cornuta	extirpated

== Ducks ==
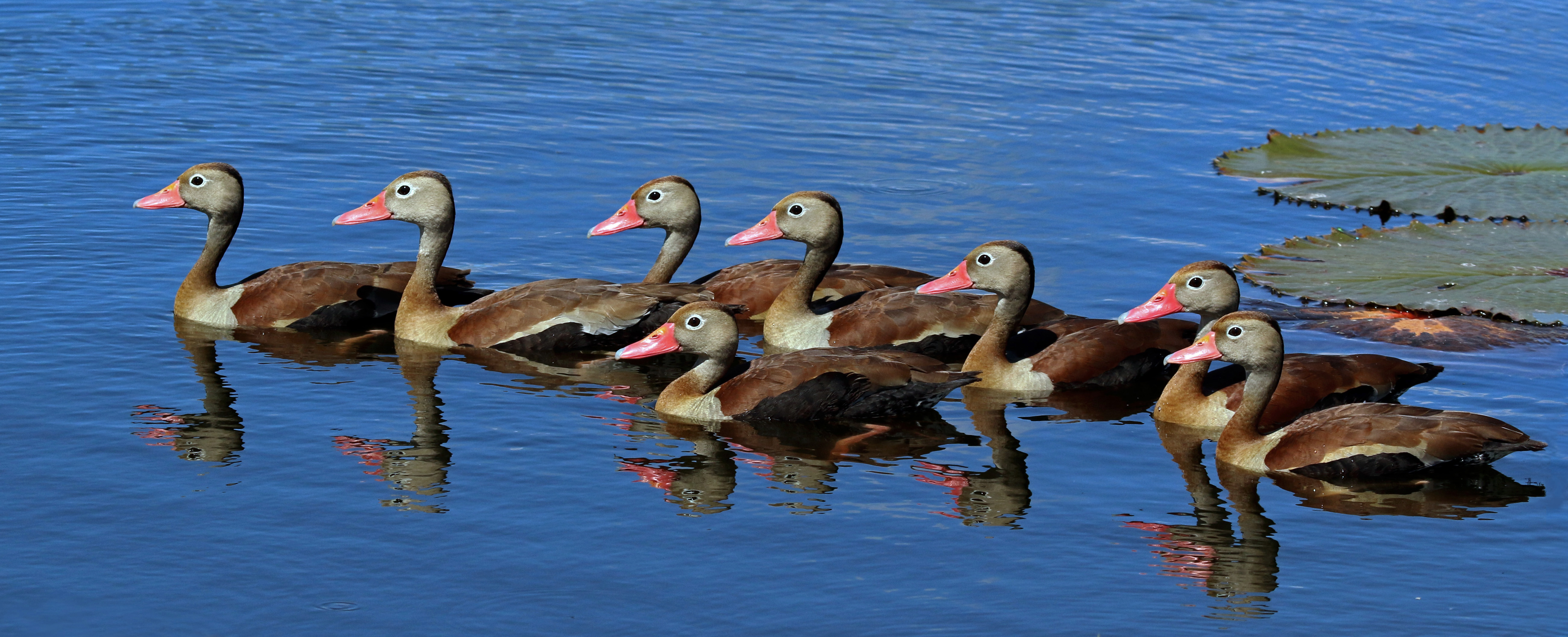
Black-bellied whistling-ducks, Tobago

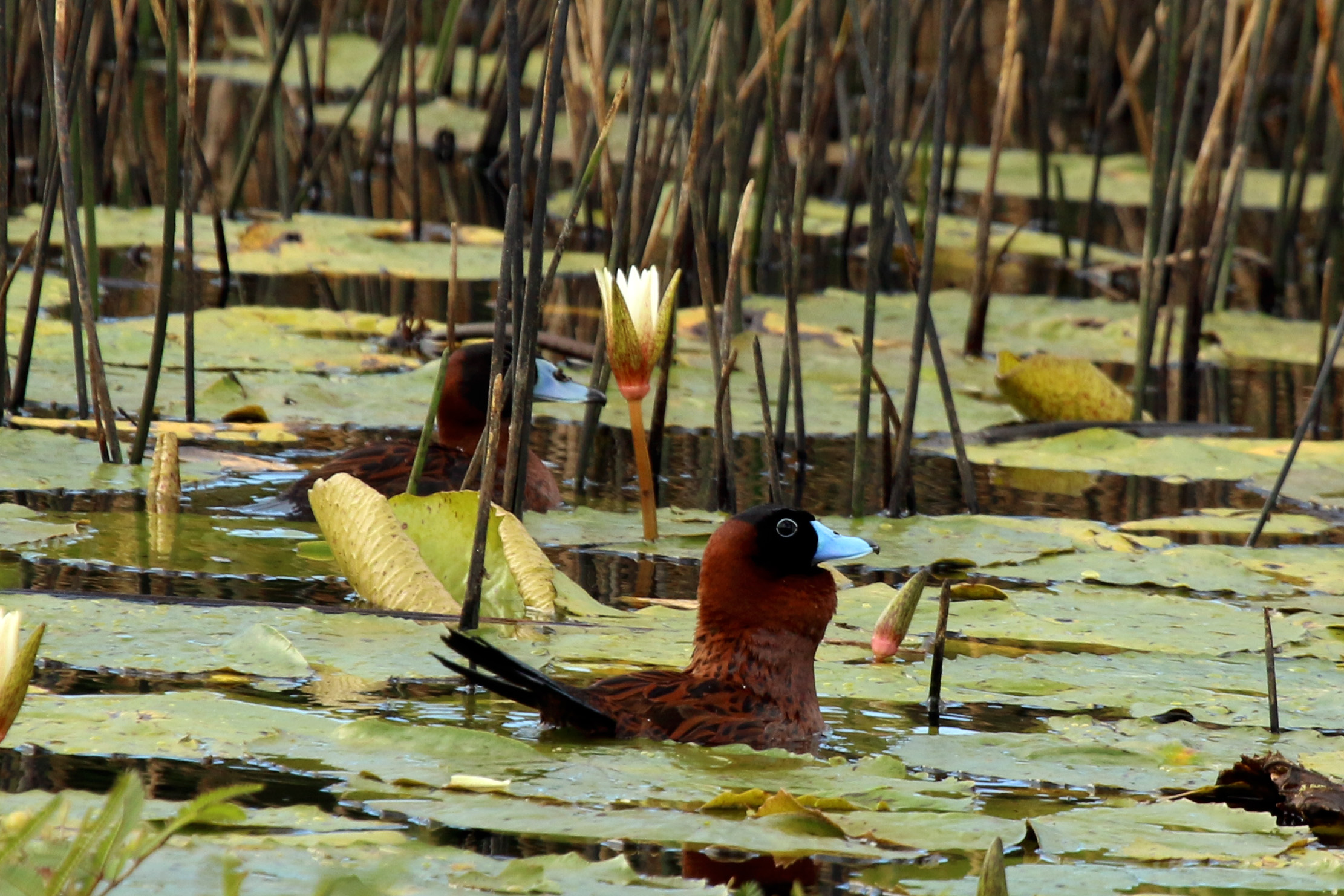
Masked duck, Tobago

Order: Anseriformes Family: Anatidae

Anatidae includes the ducks and most duck-like waterfowl, such as geese and swans. These birds are adapted to an aquatic existence with webbed feet, flattened bills, and feathers that are excellent at shedding water due to an oily coating.

Name	Binomial	Status
Fulvous whistling-duck	Dendrocygna bicolor	Trinidad only
White-faced whistling-duck	Dendrocygna viduata	Trinidad only
Black-bellied whistling-duck	Dendrocygna autumnalis	
Muscovy duck	Cairina moschata	Trinidad only - vagrant
Comb duck	Sarkidiornis sylvicola	Trinidad only - vagrant
Northern shoveller	Spatula clypeata	vagrant
Blue-winged teal	Spatula discors	
Eurasian wigeon	Mareca penelope	Tobago only - vagrant
American wigeon	Mareca americana	Tobago only - vagrant
White-cheeked pintail	Anas bahamensis	
Northern pintail	Anas acuta	vagrant
Green-winged teal	Anas crecca	vagrant
Southern pochard	Netta erythrophthalma	Trinidad only - vagrant
Ring-necked duck	Aythya collaris	vagrant
Lesser scaup	Aythya affinis	vagrant
Masked duck	Oxyura dominica	

== Guans ==
Order: Galliformes Family: Cracidae

The Cracidae are large birds, similar in general appearance to turkeys. The guans and curassows live in trees, but the smaller chachalacas are found in more open scrubby habitats. They are generally dull-plumaged, but the curassows and some guans have colorful facial ornaments.

Common name	Binomial	Status
Trinidad piping-guan	Aburria pipile	Endemic to Trinidad
Rufous-vented chachalaca	Ortalis ruficauda	Tobago only

== Flamingos ==
Order: Phoenicopteriformes Family: Phoenicopteridae

Flamingos are gregarious wading birds, usually 3 to 5 feet (0.9 to 1.5 m) tall, found in both the Western and Eastern Hemispheres. Flamingos filter-feed on shellfish and algae. Their oddly shaped beaks are specially adapted to separate mud and silt from the food they consume and, uniquely, are used upside-down.

Name	Binomial	Status
American flamingo	Phoenicopterus ruber	Trinidad only

== Grebes ==
Order: Podicipediformes Family: Podicipedidae

Grebes are small to medium-large freshwater diving birds. They have lobed toes and are excellent swimmers and divers. However, they have their feet placed far back on the body, making them quite ungainly on land.

Name	Binomial	Status
Least grebe	Tachybaptus dominicus	
Pied-billed grebe	Podilymbus podiceps	

== Pigeons ==
Order: Columbiformes Family: Columbidae

Pigeons and doves are stout-bodied birds with short necks and short slender bills with a fleshy cere.

Name	Binomial	Status
Rock pigeon	Columba livia	Introduced species
Scaled pigeon	Patagioenas speciosa	Trinidad only
Scaly-naped pigeon	Patagioenas squamosa	Tobago and Little Tobago only
Band-tailed pigeon	Patagioenas fasciata	Trinidad only - extirpated
Pale-vented pigeon	Patagioenas cayennensis	
Eurasian collared dove	Streptopelia decaocto	Trinidad only - introduced
Ruddy quail-dove	Geotrygon montana	Trinidad only
White-tipped dove	Leptotila verreauxi	
Gray-fronted dove	Leptotila rufaxilla	Trinidad only
Lined quail-dove	Zentrygon linearis	Trinidad only
Eared dove	Zenaida auriculata	
Blue ground dove	Claravis pretiosa	Trinidad only
Common ground dove	Columbina passerina	Trinidad only
Plain-breasted ground dove	Columbina minuta	Trinidad only
Ruddy ground dove	Columbina talpacoti	
Scaled dove	Columbina squammata	Trinidad only

== Cuckoos ==
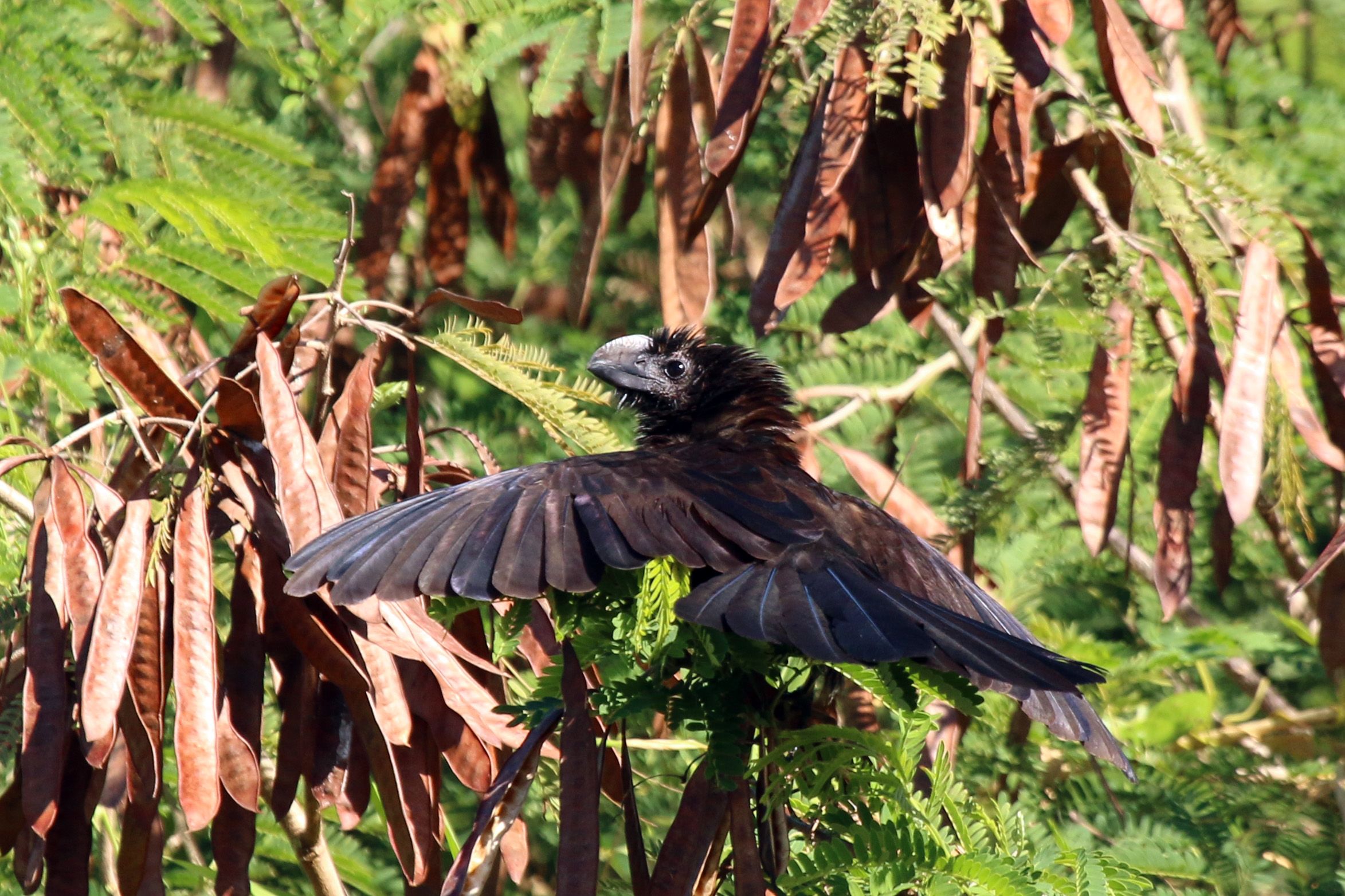
Smooth-billed ani, Tobago

Order: Cuculiformes Family: Cuculidae

The family Cuculidae includes cuckoos, roadrunners, and anis. These birds are of variable size with slender bodies, long tails, and strong legs.

Name	Binomial	Status
Greater ani	Crotophaga major	Trinidad only
Smooth-billed ani	Crotophaga ani	
Striped cuckoo	Tapera naevia	Trinidad only
Little cuckoo	Coccycua minuta	Trinidad only
Dwarf cuckoo	Coccycua pumila	Trinidad only - vagrant
Squirrel cuckoo	Piaya cayana	Trinidad only
Dark-billed cuckoo	Coccyzus melacoryphus	Trinidad only - vagrant
Yellow-billed cuckoo	Coccyzus americanus	
Mangrove cuckoo	Coccyzus minor	
Black-billed cuckoo	Coccyzus erythropthalmus	Trinidad only - vagrant

== Oilbird ==
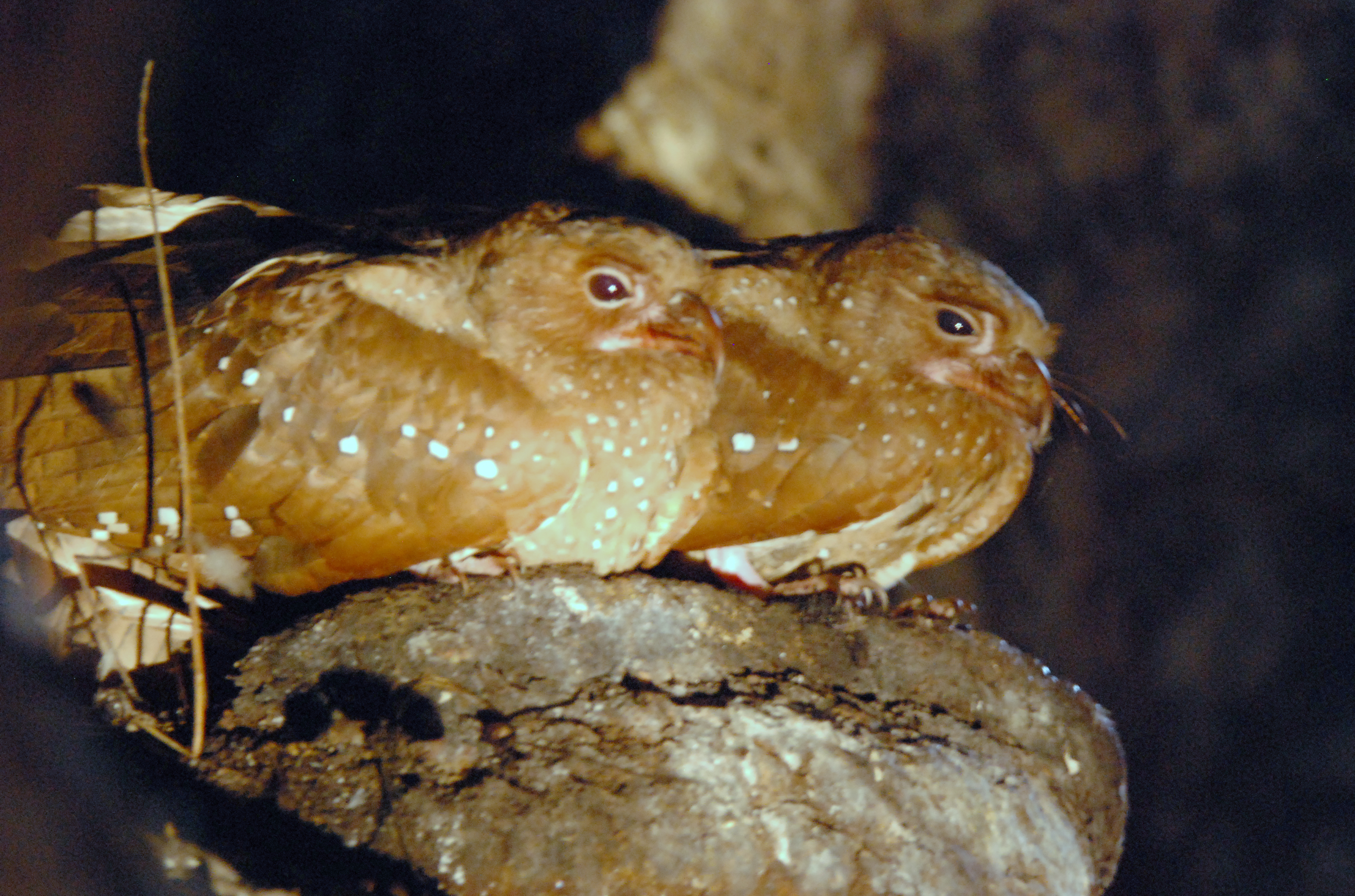
Oilbirds, Trinidad

Order: Steatornithiformes Family: Steatornithidae

The oilbird is a slim, long-winged bird related to the nightjars. It is nocturnal and a specialist feeder on the fruit of the oil palm.

Common name	Binomial	Status
Oilbird	Steatornis caripensis	Trinidad only

== Potoos ==
Order: Nyctibiiformes Family: Nyctibiidae

The potoos (sometimes called poor-me-ones) are large near passerine birds related to the nightjars and frogmouths. They are nocturnal insectivores which lack the bristles around the mouth found in the true nightjars.

Common name	Binomial	Status
Common potoo	Nyctibius griseus	

== Nightjars ==
Order: Caprimulgiformes Family: Caprimulgidae

Nightjars are medium-sized nocturnal birds that usually nest on the ground. They have long wings, short legs, and very short bills. Most have small feet, of little use for walking, and long pointed wings. Their soft plumage is camouflaged to resemble bark or leaves.

Common name	Binomial	Status
Nacunda nighthawk	Chordeiles nacunda	Trinidad only
Lesser nighthawk	Chordeiles acutipennis	Common Trinidad, vagrant Tobago
Common nighthawk/Antillean nighthawk	Chordeiles minor/Chordeiles gundlachii	Trinidad - vagrant
Short-tailed nighthawk	Lurocalis semitorquatus	Trinidad only
Common pauraque	Nyctidromus albicollis	Trinidad only
White-tailed nightjar	Hydropsalis cayennensis	
Rufous nightjar	Antrostomus rufus	Trinidad only

== Swifts ==
Order: Apodiformes Family: Apodidae

Swifts are small birds which spend the majority of their lives flying. These birds have very short legs and never settle voluntarily on the ground, perching instead only on vertical surfaces. Many swifts have long swept-back wings which resemble a crescent or boomerang.

Common name	Binomial	Status
Chestnut-collared swift	Cypseloides rutilus	Trinidad only
White-collared swift	Streptoprocne zonaris	Common Trinidad, vagrant Tobago
Gray-rumped swift	Chaetura cinereiventris	
Band-rumped swift	Chaetura spinicaudus	Trinidad only
Vaux's swift (not on the BDSC list)	Chaetura vauxi	vagrant
Chapman's swift	Chaetura chapmani	Trinidad only
Short-tailed swift	Chaetura brachyura	
Fork-tailed palm-swift	Tachornis squamata	
Lesser swallow-tailed swift	Panyptila cayennensis	Trinidad only

== Hummingbirds ==
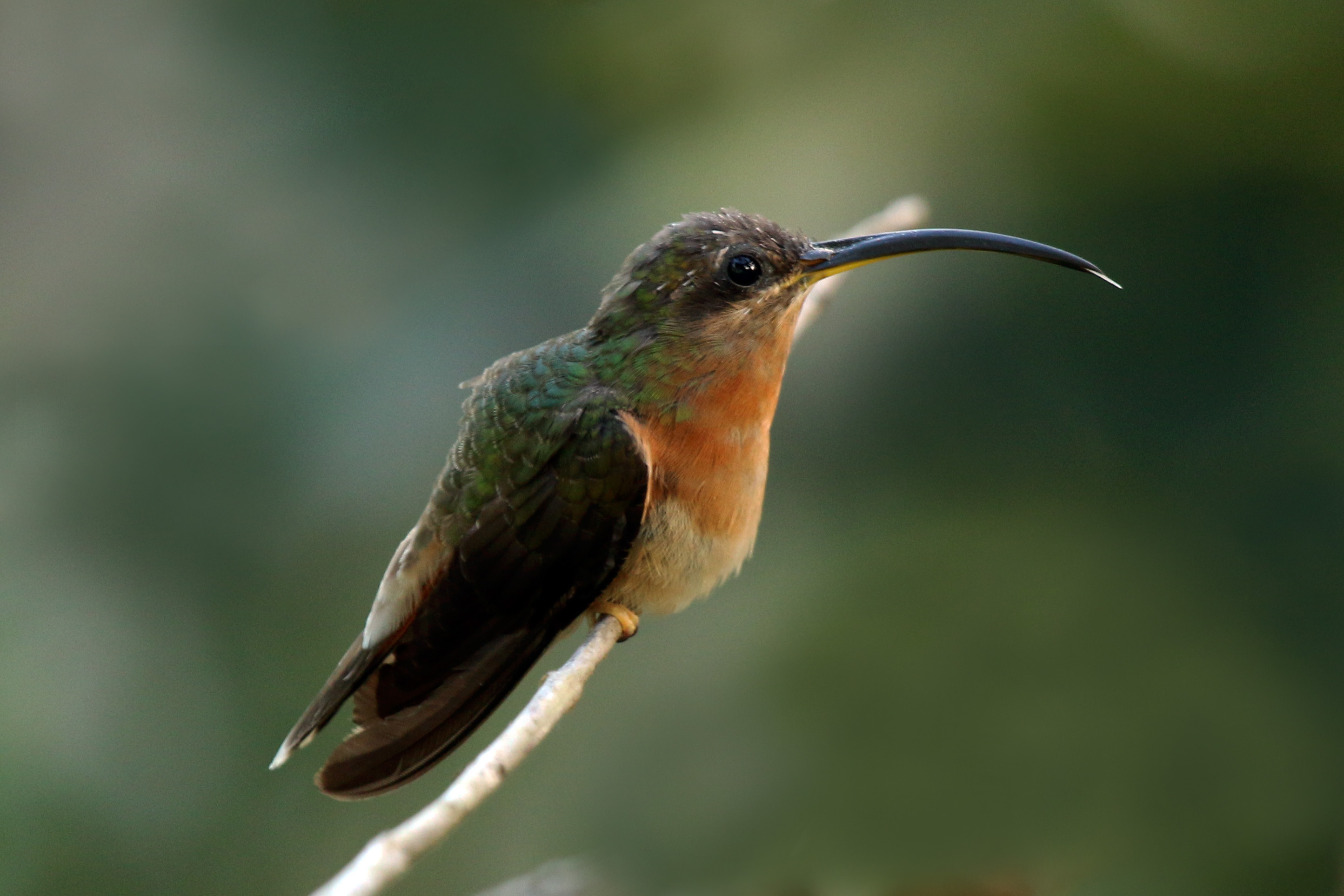
Rufous-breasted hermit, Tobago

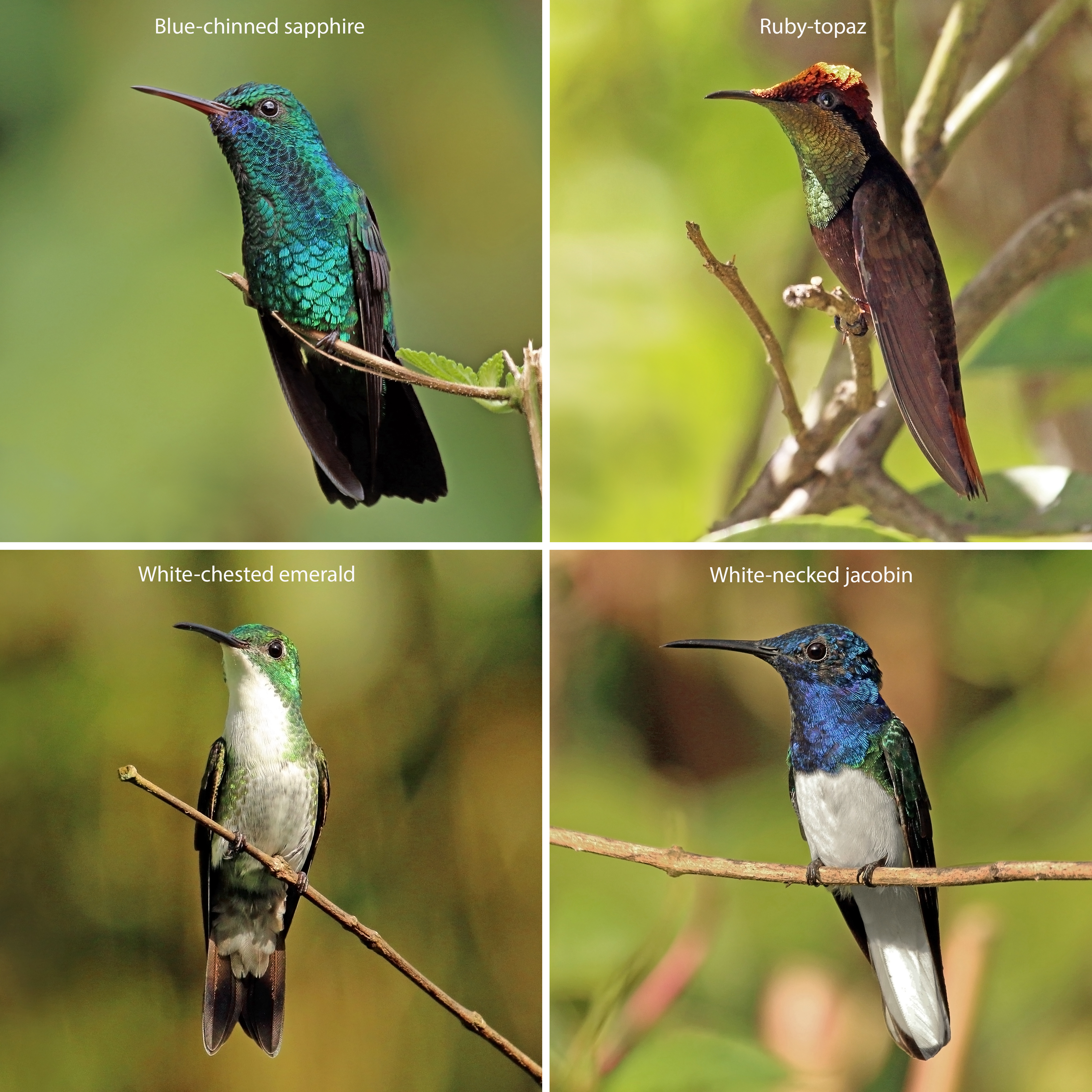
Hummingbirds of Trinidad and Tobago

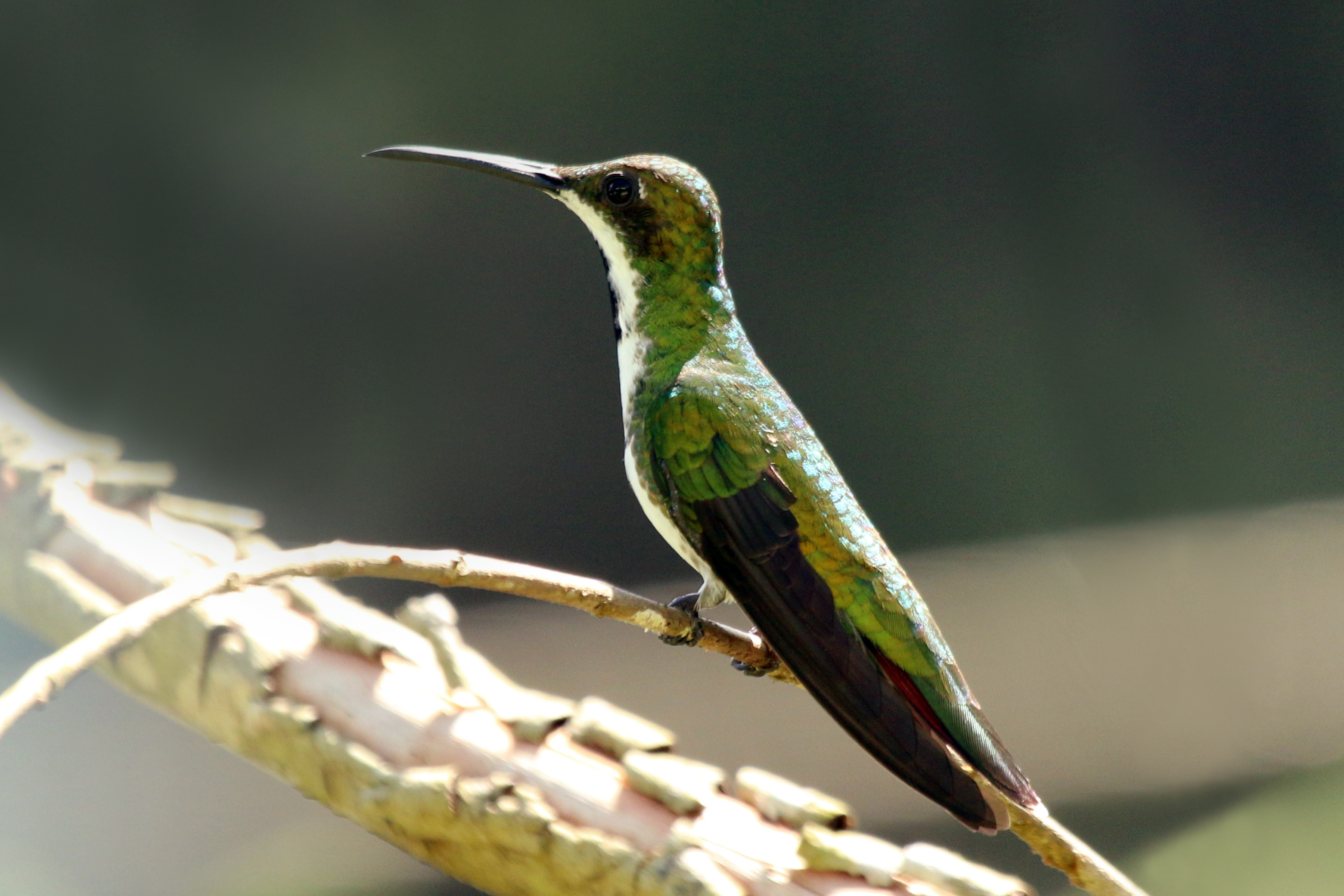
Black-throated mango, Tobago

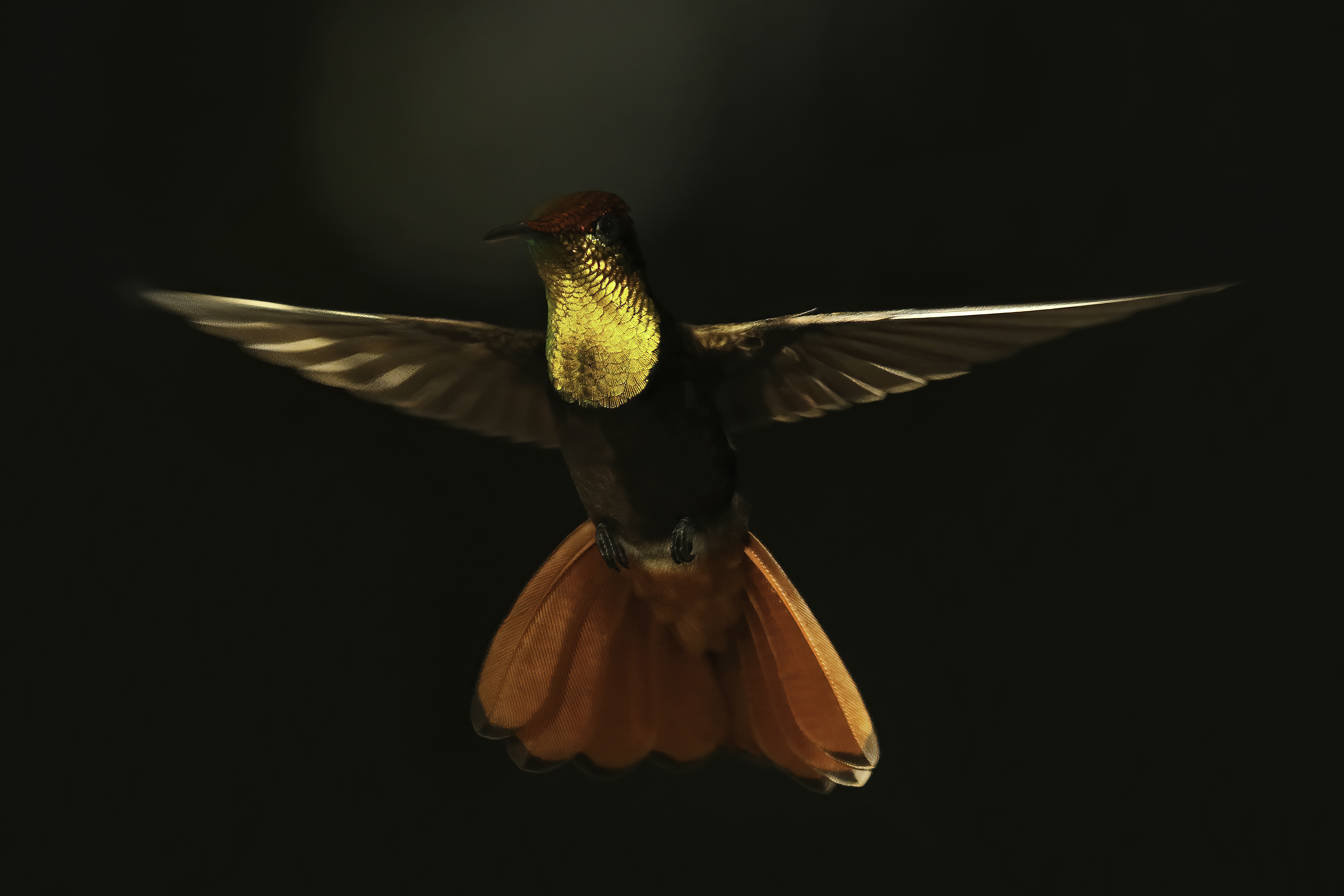
Ruby-topaz hummingbird, Tobago

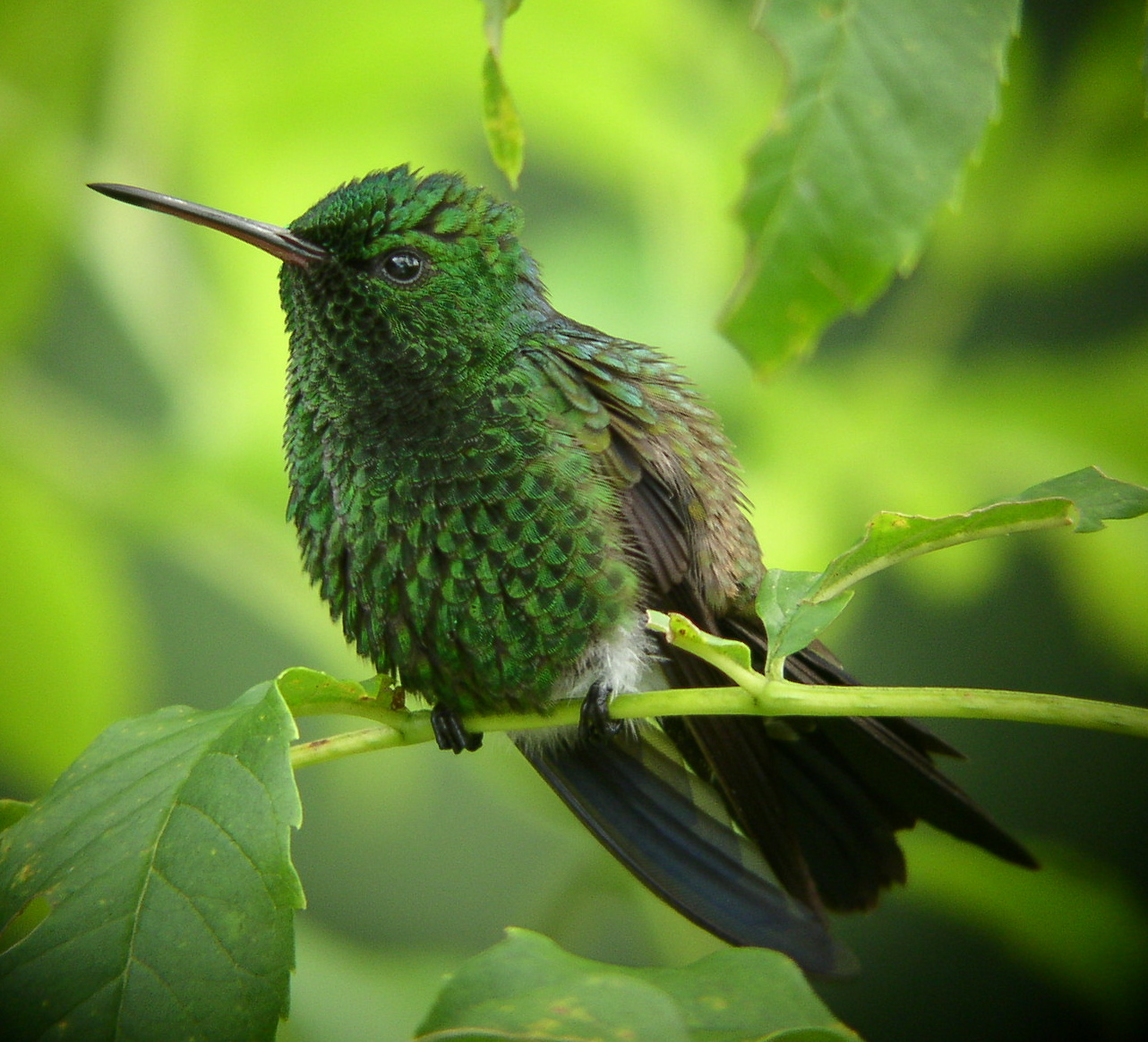
Copper-rumped hummingbird, Trinidad

Order: Apodiformes Family: Trochilidae

Hummingbirds are small birds capable of hovering in mid-air due to the rapid flapping of their wings. They are the only birds that can fly backwards.

Common name	Binomial	Status
White-necked jacobin	Florisuga mellivora mellivora	
Rufous-breasted hermit	Glaucis hirsutus insularum	
Little hermit	Phaethornis longuemareus	Trinidad only
Green hermit	Phaethornis guy	Trinidad only
Brown violetear	Colibri delphinae	Common Trinidad, vagrant Tobago
White-tailed goldenthroat	Polytmus guainumbi	Trinidad only
Ruby-topaz hummingbird	Chrysolampis mosquitus	
Green-throated mango	Anthracothorax viridigula	Trinidad only
Black-throated mango	Anthracothorax nigricollis	
Tufted coquette	Lophornis ornatus	Trinidad only
Long-billed starthroat	Heliomaster longirostris	Trinidad only
Rufous-shafted woodstar	Chaetocercus jourdanii	Trinidad only - vagrant
Amethyst woodstar	Calliphlox amethystina	Trinidad only - vagrant
Blue-tailed emerald	Chlorostilbon mellisugus	Trinidad only
White-tailed sabrewing	Campylopterus ensipennis	Tobago only - near-threatened
Copper-rumped hummingbird	Saucerottia tobaci erythronota	Trinidad only for subspecies
Copper-rumped hummingbird	Saucerottia tobaci tobaci	Tobago only for subspecies
White-chested emerald	Chrysuronia brevirostris	Trinidad only
Blue-chinned sapphire	Chlorestes notata	Common Trinidad, vagrant Tobago

== Limpkin ==
Order: Gruiformes Family: Aramidae

The limpkin resembles a large rail. It has drab-brown plumage and a grayer head and neck.

Name	Binomial	Status
Limpkin	Aramus guarauna	Common Trinidad, vagrant Tobago

== Rails ==
Order: Gruiformes Family: Rallidae

Rallidae is a large family of small to medium-sized birds which includes the rails, crakes, coots, and gallinules. Typically they inhabit dense vegetation in damp environments near lakes, swamps, or rivers. In general they are shy and secretive birds, making them difficult to observe. Most species have strong legs and long toes which are well adapted to soft uneven surfaces. They tend to have short, rounded wings and to be weak fliers.

Name	Binomial	Status
Mangrove rail	Rallus longirostris	Trinidad only
Purple gallinule	Porphyrio martinica	
Azure gallinule	Porphyrio flavirostris	Common Trinidad, vagrant Tobago
Gray-breasted crake	Laterallus exilis	Trinidad only
Ash-throated crake	Mustelirallus albicollis	Trinidad only - extirpated
Paint-billed crake	Mustelirallus erythrops	Trinidad only - vagrant
Spotted rail	Pardirallus maculatus	Trinidad only - vagrant
Gray-cowled wood-rail	Aramides cajaneus	Trinidad only
Rufous-necked wood-rail	Aramides axillaris	Trinidad only
Uniform crake	Amaurolimnas concolor	Trinidad only - vagrant
Yellow-breasted crake	Haplocrex flaviventer	Common Trinidad, vagrant Tobago
Sora	Porzana carolina	
Common gallinule	Gallinula galeata	
American coot	Fulica americana	vagrant

== Finfoots ==
Order: Gruiformes Family: Heliornithidae

Heliornithidae is a small family of tropical birds with webbed lobes on their feet similar to those of grebes and coots.

Name	Binomial	Status
Sungrebe	Heliornis fulica	Trinidad only - vagrant

== Plovers ==
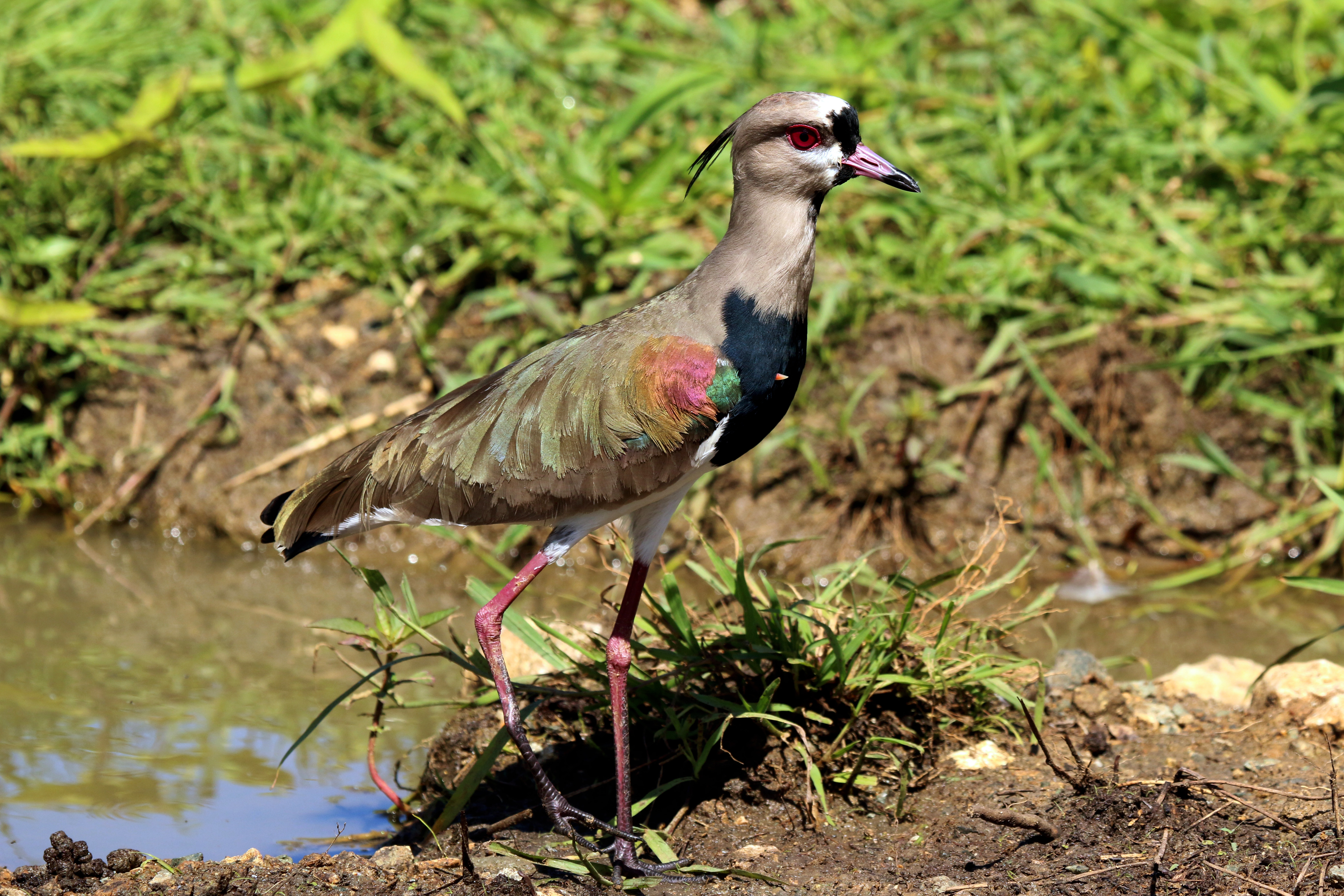
Southern lapwing, Tobago

Order: Charadriiformes Family: Charadriidae

The family Charadriidae includes the plovers, dotterels, and lapwings. They are small to medium-sized birds with compact bodies, short, thick necks, and long, usually pointed, wings. They are found in open country worldwide, mostly in habitats near water.

Name	Binomial	Status
Black-bellied plover	Pluvialis squatarola	
American golden-plover	Pluvialis dominica	
Pied lapwing	Hoploxypterus cayanus	Trinidad only - vagrant
Killdeer	Charadrius vociferus	vagrant
Semipalmated plover	Charadrius semipalmatus	
Common ringed plover	Charadrius hiaticula	vagrant
Southern lapwing	Vanellus chilensis	
Wilson's plover	Anarynchus wilsonia	Trinidad only
Collared plover	Anarynchus collaris	Common Trinidad, vagrant Tobago
Snowy plover	Anarynchus nivosus	Tobago only - vagrant

== Oystercatchers ==
Order: Charadriiformes Family: Haematopodidae

The oystercatchers are large and noisy plover-like birds, with strong bills used for smashing or prising open molluscs.

Name	Binomial	Status
American oystercatcher	Haematopus palliatus	vagrant

== Avocets and stilts ==
Order: Charadriiformes Family: Recurvirostridae

Recurvirostridae is a family of large wading birds which includes the avocets and stilts. The avocets have long legs and long up-curved bills. The stilts have extremely long legs and long, thin, straight bills.

Name	Binomial	Status
Black-necked stilt	Himantopus mexicanus	Common Trinidad, vagrant Tobago
American avocet	Recurvirostra americana	Tobago only - vagrant

== Thick-knees ==
Order: Charadriiformes Family: Burhinidae

The thick-knees are a group of waders found worldwide within the tropical zone, with some species also breeding in temperate Europe and Australia. They are medium to large waders with strong black or yellow-black bills, large yellow eyes, and cryptic plumage. Despite being classed as waders, most species have a preference for arid or semi-arid habitats.

Name	Binomial	Status
Double-striped thick-knee	Hesperoburhinus bistriatus	vagrant

== Sandpipers ==
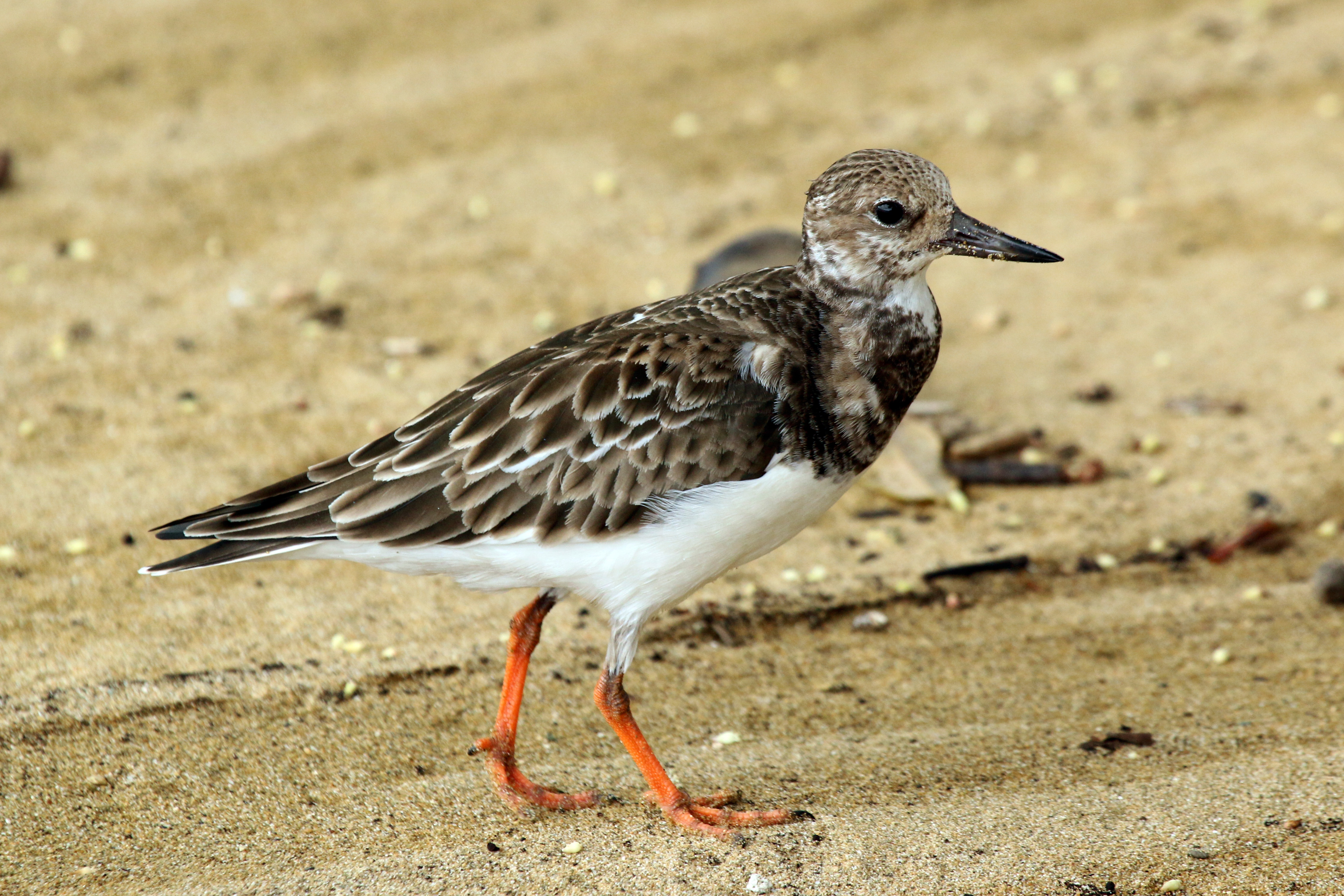
Ruddy turnstone, Tobago

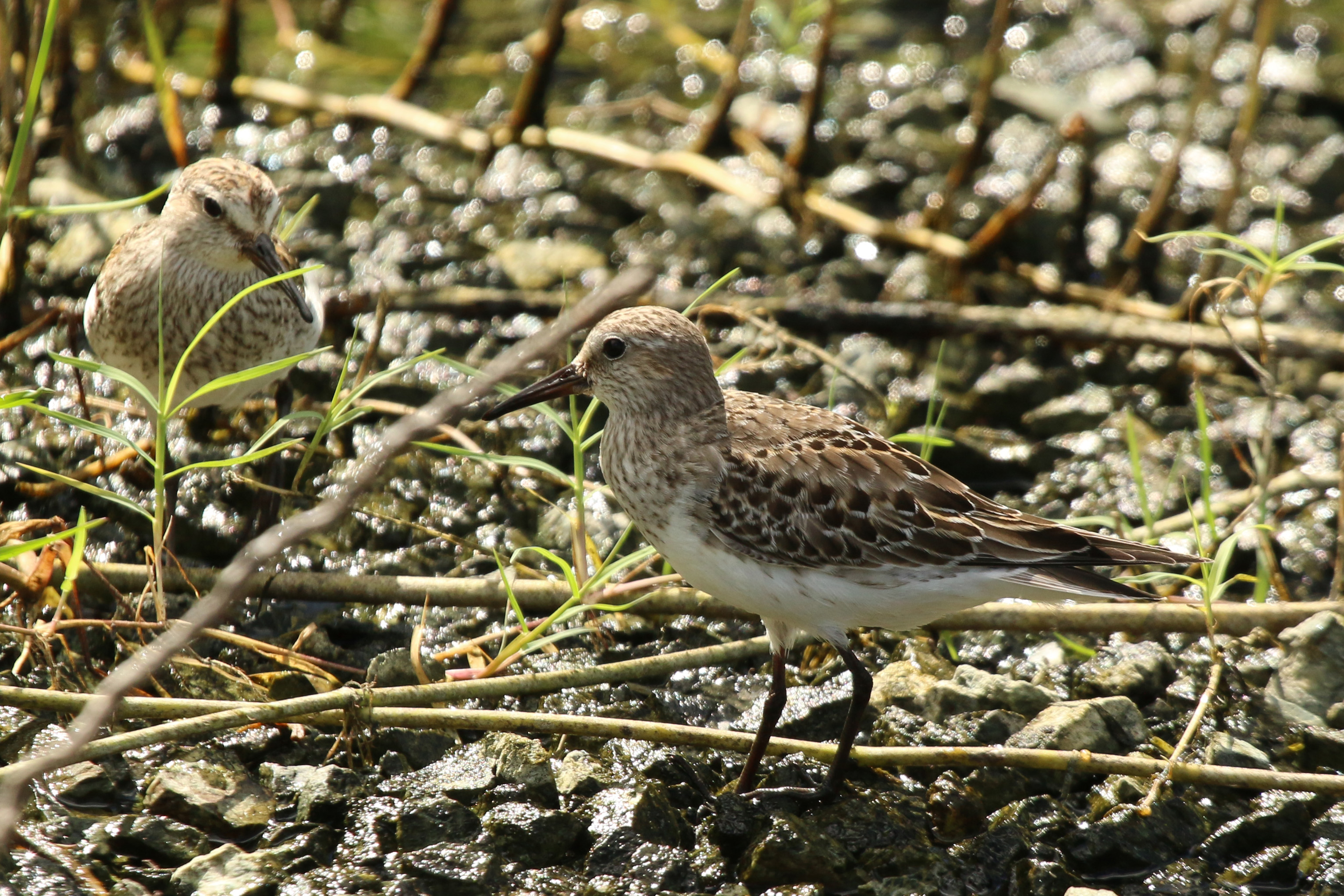
White-rumped sandpiper, Tobago

Order: Charadriiformes Family: Scolopacidae

Scolopacidae is a large diverse family of small to medium-sized shorebirds including the sandpipers, curlews, godwits, shanks, tattlers, woodcocks, snipes, dowitchers, and phalaropes. The majority of these species eat small invertebrates picked out of the mud or soil. Variation in length of legs and bills enables multiple species to feed in the same habitat, particularly on the coast, without direct competition for food.

Name	Binomial	Status
Upland sandpiper	Bartramia longicauda	
Eskimo curlew	Numenius borealis	extirpated, possibly extinct
Whimbrel	Numenius phaeopus	
Long-billed curlew	Numenius americanus	Tobago only - vagrant
Black-tailed godwit	Limosa limosaa	Trinidad only - vagrant
Hudsonian godwit	Limosa haemastica	Trinidad only
Marbled godwit	Limosa fedoa	Trinidad only - vagrant
Ruddy turnstone	Arenaria interpres morinella	
Red knot	Calidris canutus	Trinidad only
Ruff	Calidris pugnax	vagrant
Stilt sandpiper	Calidris himantopus	
Curlew sandpiper	Calidris ferruginea	Trinidad only - vagrant
Sanderling	Calidris alba	
Baird's sandpiper	Calidris bairdii	Trinidad only - vagrant
Least sandpiper	Calidris minutilla	
White-rumped sandpiper	Calidris fuscicollis	
Buff-breasted sandpiper	Calidris subruficollis	
Pectoral sandpiper	Calidris melanotos	
Semipalmated sandpiper	Calidris pusilla	
Western sandpiper	Calidris mauri	
Short-billed dowitcher	Limnodromus griseus	
Wilson's snipe	Gallinago delicata	
Pantanal snipe	Gallinago paraguaiae	Trinidad only
Wilson's phalarope	Phalaropus tricolor	vagrant
Terek sandpiper	Xenus cinereus	Trinidad only - vagrant
Spotted sandpiper	Actitis macularius	
Solitary sandpiper	Tringa solitaria	
Common greenshank	Tringa nebularia	vagrant
Greater yellowlegs	Tringa melanoleuca	
Willet	Tringa semipalmata	
Lesser yellowlegs	Tringa flavipes	
Spotted redshank	Tringa erythropus	Tobago only - vagrant
Wood sandpiper	Tringa glareola	Tobago only - vagrant

== Jacanas ==
Order: Charadriiformes Family: Jacanidae

The jacanas are a group of waders found throughout the tropics. They are identifiable by their huge feet and claws which enable them to walk on floating vegetation in the shallow lakes that are their preferred habitat.

Name	Binomial	Status
Wattled jacana	Jacana jacana	

== Skuas ==
Order: Charadriiformes Family: Stercorariidae

The family Stercorariidae are, in general, medium to large birds, typically with gray or brown plumage, often with white markings on the wings. They nest on the ground in temperate and arctic regions and are long-distance migrants.

Name	Binomial	Status
South polar skua	Stercorarius maccormicki	Trinidad only - vagrant
Pomarine jaeger	Stercorarius pomarinus	Trinidad only - vagrant
Parasitic jaeger	Stercorarius parasiticus	Trinidad only - vagrant

== Gulls ==
Order: Charadriiformes Family: Laridae

Laridae is a family of medium to large seabirds and includes gulls, kittiwakes, terns, and skimmers. They are typically gray or white, often with black markings on the head or wings. They have stout, longish bills and webbed feet. Terns are a group of generally medium to large seabirds typically with gray or white plumage, often with black markings on the head. Most terns hunt fish by diving but some pick insects off the surface of fresh water. Terns are generally long-lived birds, with several species known to live in excess of 30 years.

Name	Binomial	Status
Brown noddy	Anous stolidus	
Atlantic white-tern	Gygis alba	Tobago only - vagrant
Black skimmer	Rynchops niger	
Black-legged kittiwake	Rissa tridactyla	vagrant
Sabine's gull	Xema sabini	Trinidad only - vagrant
Black-headed gull	Chroicocephalus ridibundus	vagrant
Laughing gull	Leucophaeus atricilla	
Franklin's gull	Leucophaeus pipixcan	Trinidad only
Audouin's gull	Ichthyaetus audouinii	Trinidad only - vagrant
Ring-billed gull	Larus delawarensis	Trinidad only - vagrant
Great black-backed gull	Larus marinus	Trinidad only - vagrant
Kelp gull	Larus dominicanus	Trinidad only - vagrant
Lesser black-backed gull	Larus fuscus	Common Trinidad, vagrant Tobago
Herring gull	Larus argentatus	vagrant
Sooty tern	Onychoprion fuscata	
Bridled tern	Onychoprion anaethetus	
Least tern	Sternula antillarum	
Yellow-billed tern	Sternula superciliaris	Trinidad only
Large-billed tern	Phaetusa simplex	Trinidad only
Gull-billed tern	Gelochelidon nilotica	Common Trinidad, vagrant Tobago
Caspian tern	Hydroprogne caspia	Trinidad only - vagrant
Black tern	Chlidonias niger	Trinidad only
Common tern	Sterna hirundo	
Roseate tern	Sterna dougallii	
Arctic tern	Sterna paradisaea	vagrant
Sandwich tern	Thalasseus sandvicensis	
Royal tern	Thalasseus maxima	

== Tropicbirds ==
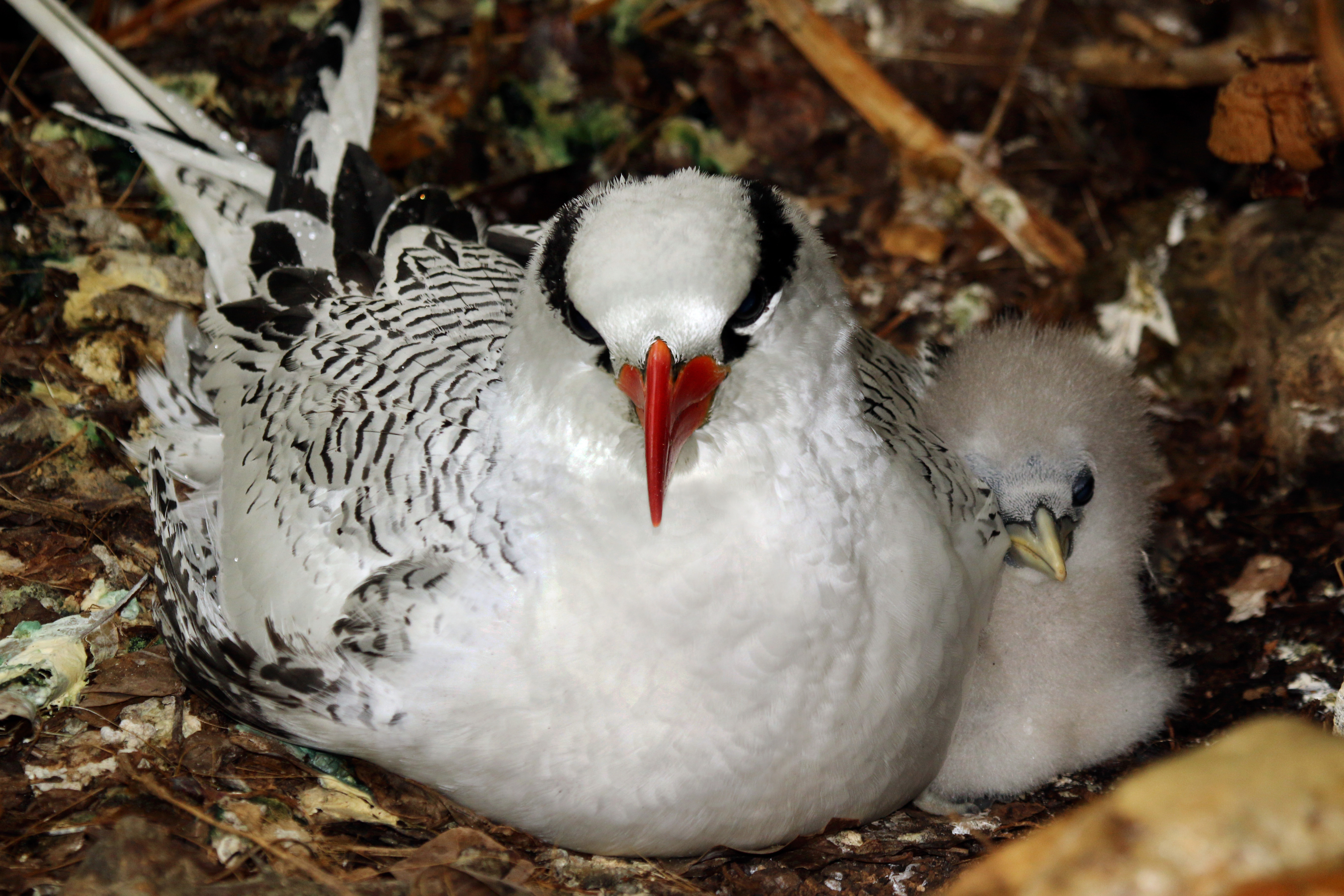
Red-billed tropicbirds, Little Tobago

Order: Phaethontiformes Family: Phaethontidae

Tropicbirds are slender white birds of tropical oceans with exceptionally long central tail feathers. Their heads and long wings have black markings.

Common name	Binomial	Status
Red-billed tropicbird	Phaethon aethereus	
White-tailed tropicbird	Phaethon lepturus	Tobago only

== Southern storm-petrels ==
Order: Procellariiformes Family: Oceanitidae

The storm-petrels are the smallest seabirds, relatives of the petrels, feeding on planktonic crustaceans and small fish picked from the surface, typically while hovering. The flight is fluttering and sometimes bat-like. Until 2018, this family's species were included with the other storm-petrels in family Hydrobatidae.

Common name	Binomial	Status
Wilson's storm-petrel	Oceanites oceanicus	vagrant

== Northern storm-petrels ==
Order: Procellariiformes Family: Hydrobatidae

Though the members of this family are similar in many respects to the southern storm-petrels, including their general appearance and habits, there are enough genetic differences to warrant their placement in a separate family.

Common name	Binomial	Status
Leach's storm-petrel	Hydrobates leucorhous	

== Shearwaters ==
Order: Procellariiformes Family: Procellariidae

The procellariids are the main group of medium-sized "true petrels", characterised by united nostrils with medium septum and a long outer functional primary.

Common name	Binomial	Status
Bulwer's petrel	Bulweria bulwerii	Trinidad only - vagrant
Cory's shearwater	Calonectris diomedea	vagrant
Cape Verde shearwater	Calonectris edwardsii	vagrant
Sooty shearwater	Ardenna grisea	Trinidad only - vagrant
Great shearwater	Ardenna gravis	vagrant
Manx shearwater	Puffinus puffinus	Trinidad only - vagrant
Audubon's shearwater	Puffinus lherminieri	Little Tobago only

== Storks ==
Order: Ciconiiformes Family: Ciconiidae

Storks are large, long-legged, long-necked, wading birds with long, stout bills. Storks are mute, but bill-clattering is an important mode of communication at the nest. Their nests can be large and may be reused for many years. Many species are migratory.

Name	Binomial	Status
Maguari stork	Ciconia maguari	Trinidad only - vagrant
Jabiru	Jabiru mycteria	vagrant
Wood stork	Mycteria americana	Trinidad only - vagrant

== Frigatebirds ==
Order: Suliformes Family: Fregatidae

Frigatebirds are large seabirds usually found over tropical oceans. They are large, black-and-white, or completely black, with long wings and deeply forked tails. The males have colored inflatable throat pouches. They do not swim or walk and cannot take off from a flat surface. Having the largest wingspan-to-body-weight ratio of any bird, they are essentially aerial, able to stay aloft for more than a week.

Common name	Binomial	Status
Magnificent frigatebird	Fregata magnificens	

== Boobies ==
Order: Suliformes Family: Sulidae

The sulids comprise the gannets and boobies. Both groups are medium to large coastal seabirds that plunge-dive for fish.

Common name	Binomial	Status
Masked booby	Sula dactylatra	
Red-footed booby	Sula sula	
Brown booby	Sula leucogaster	
Northern gannet	Morus bassanus	Tobago only - vagrant

== Anhingas ==
Order: Suliformes Family: Anhingidae

Anhingas are often called "snake-birds" because they have long thin necks, which gives a snake-like appearance when they swim with their bodies submerged. The males have black and dark-brown plumage, an erectile crest on the nape, and a larger bill than the female. The females have much paler plumage, especially on the neck and underparts. The darters have completely webbed feet and their legs are short and set far back on the body. Their plumage is somewhat permeable, like that of cormorants, and they spread their wings to dry after diving.

Common name	Binomial	Status
Anhinga	Anhinga anhinga	

== Cormorants ==
Order: Suliformes Family: Phalacrocoracidae

Phalacrocoracidae is a family of medium to large coastal, fish-eating seabirds that includes cormorants and shags. Plumage coloration varies; the majority of species have mainly dark plumage, but some are pied black and white, and a few are more colorful.

Common name	Binomial	Status
Neotropic cormorant	Phalacrocorax brasilianus	

== Pelicans ==
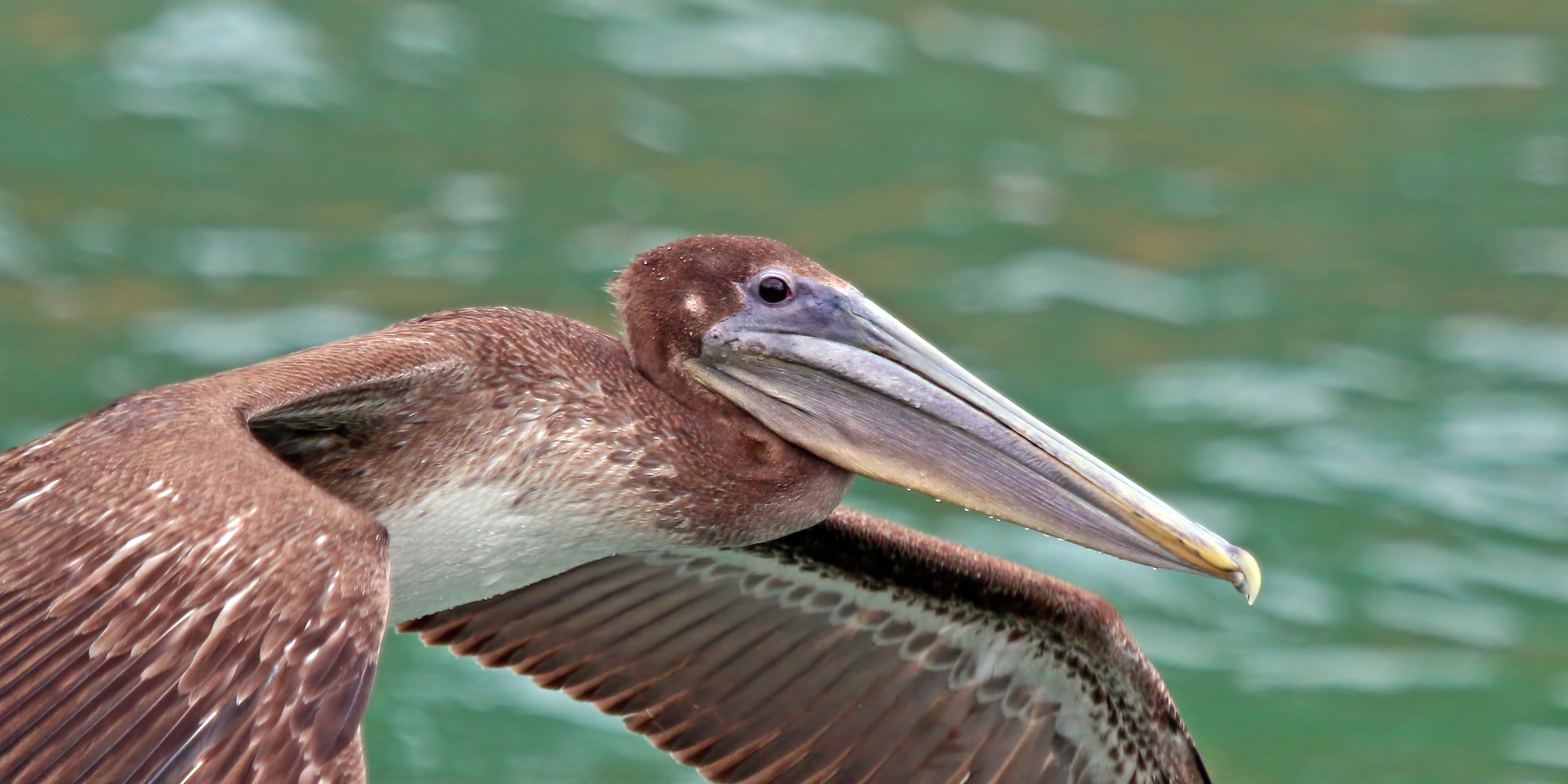
Juvenile brown pelican, Tobago

Order: Pelecaniformes Family: Pelecanidae

Pelicans are large water birds with a distinctive pouch under their beak. As with other members of the order Pelecaniformes, they have webbed feet with four toes.

Common name	Binomial	Status
Brown pelican	Pelecanus occidentalis	

== Herons ==
Order: Pelecaniformes Family: Ardeidae

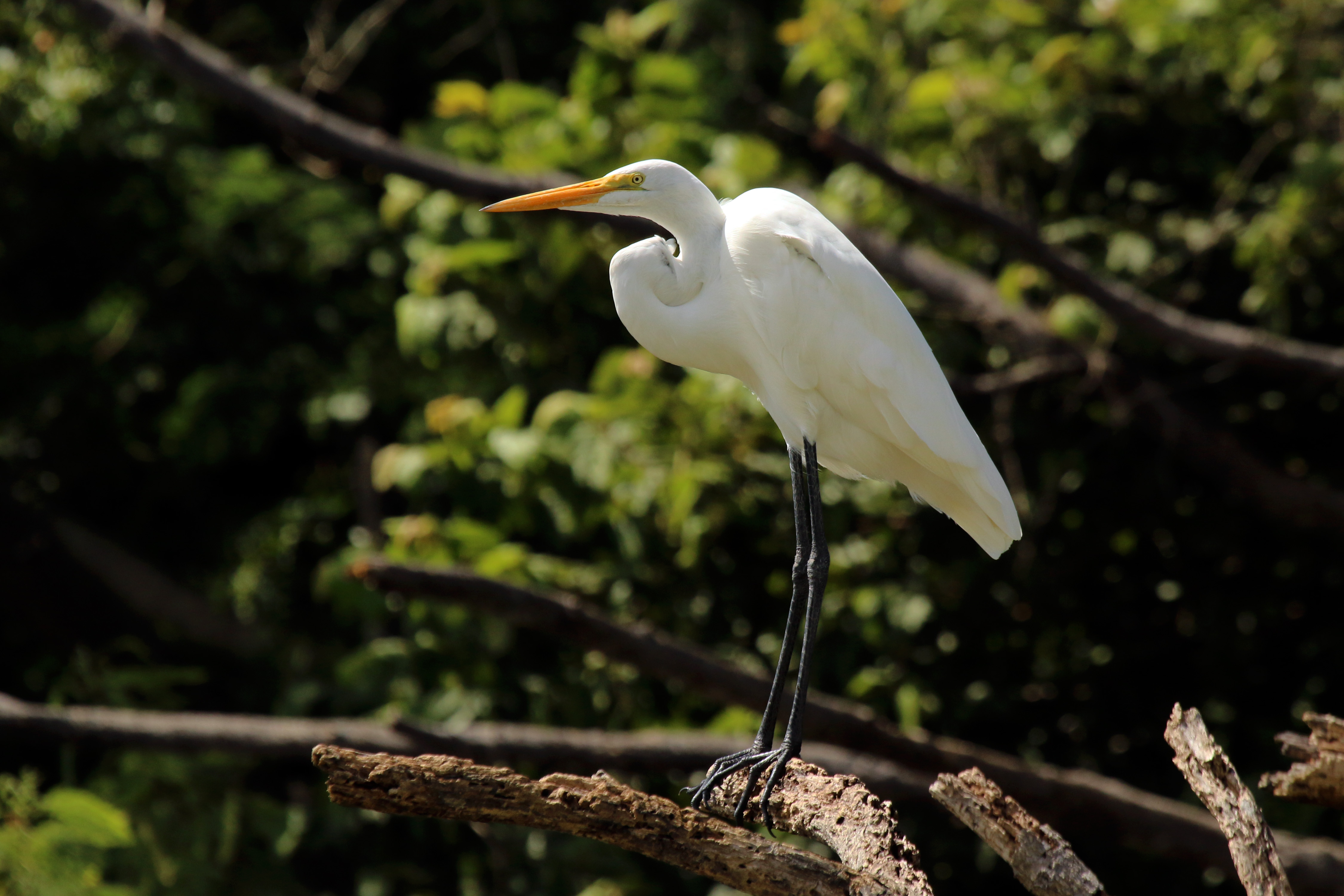
Great egret, Tobago

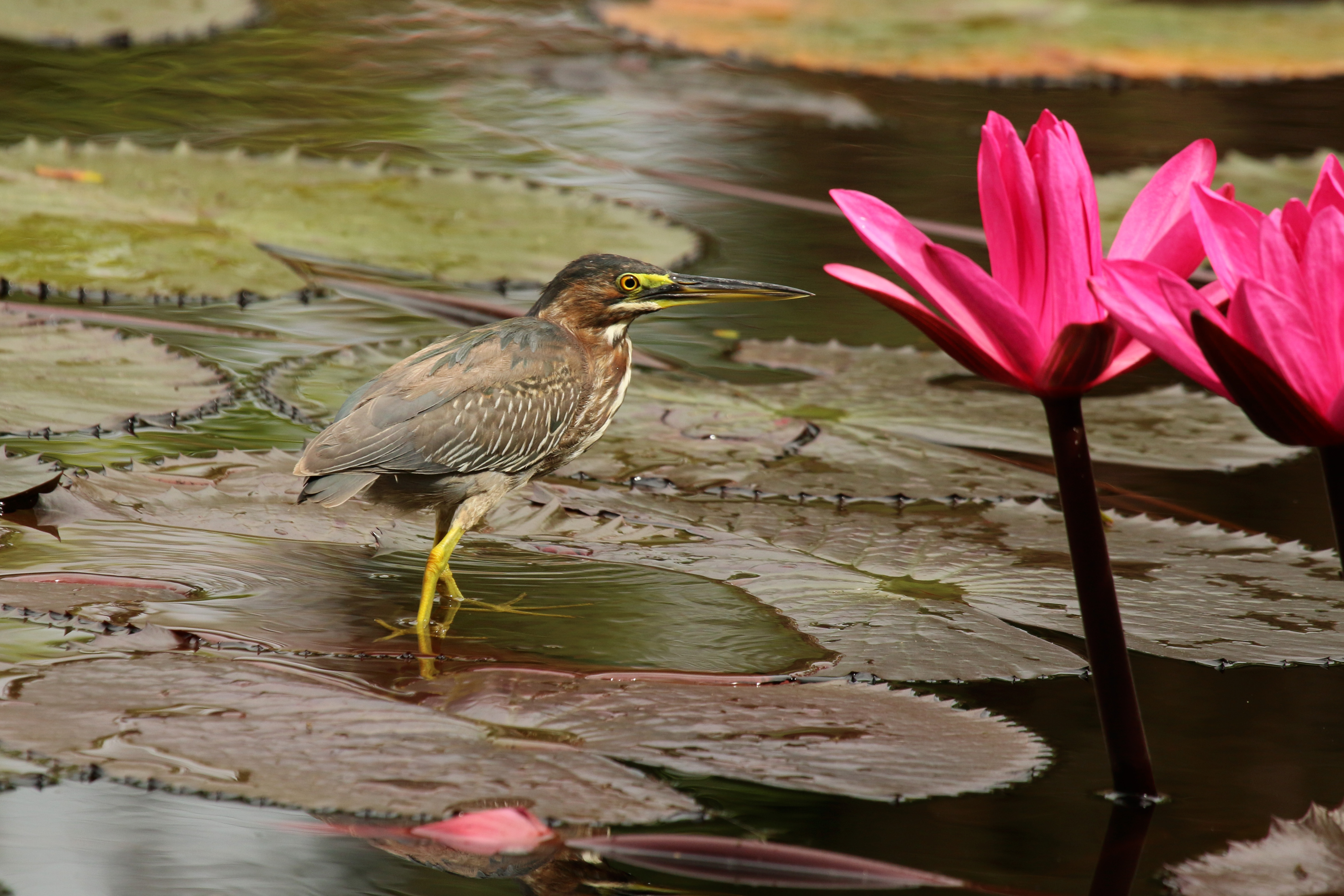
Green heron, Tobago

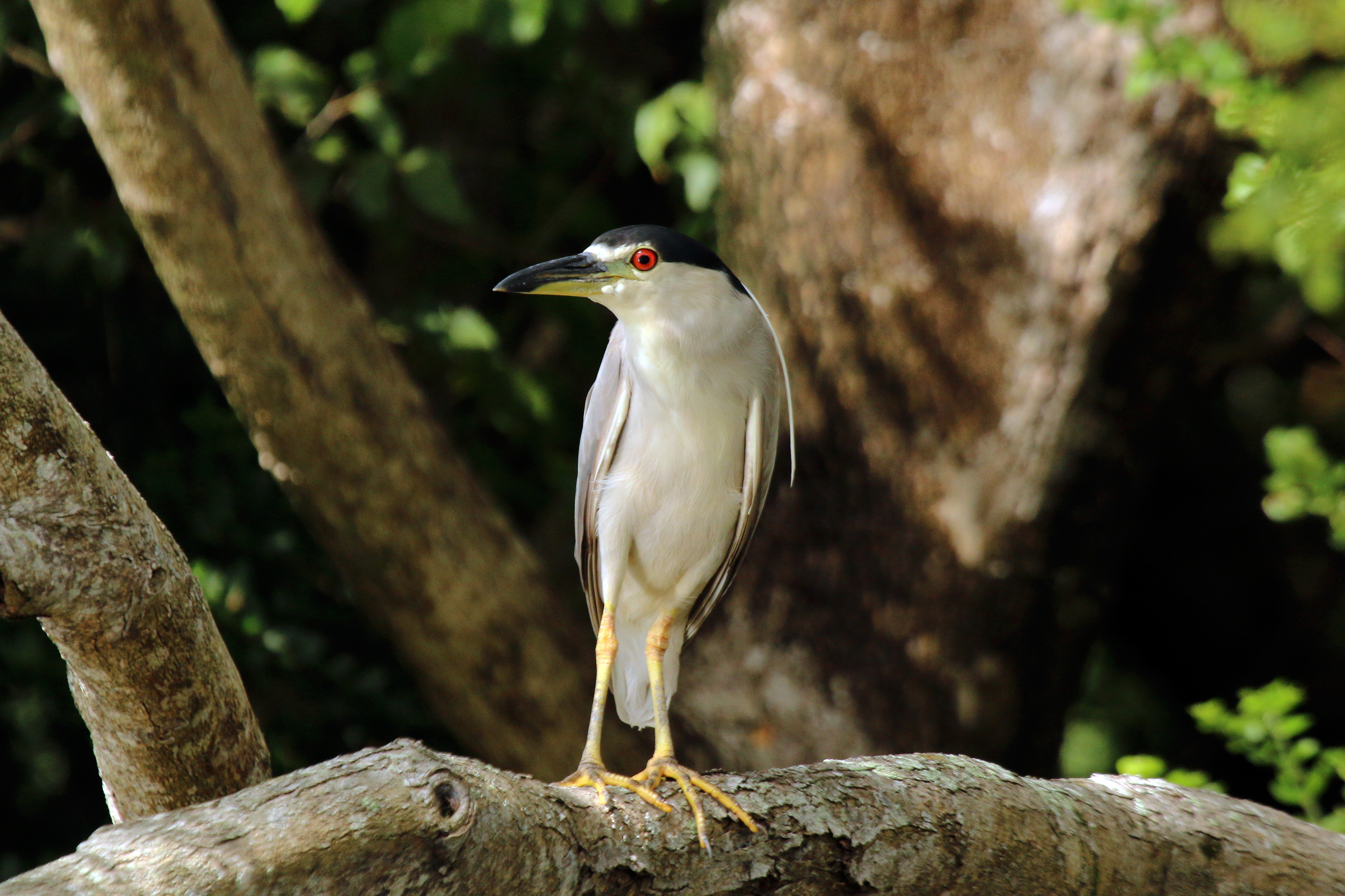
Black-crowned night-heron, Tobago

The family Ardeidae contains the bitterns, herons, and egrets. Herons and egrets are medium to large wading birds with long necks and legs. Bitterns tend to be shorter necked and more wary. Members of Ardeidae fly with their necks retracted, unlike other long-necked birds such as storks, ibises, and spoonbills.

Name	Binomial	Status
Rufescent tiger-heron	Tigrisoma lineatum	Trinidad only
Fasciated tiger-heron	Tigrisoma fasciatum	Trinidad only - vagrant
Boat-billed heron	Cochlearius cochlearius	Trinidad only
Agami heron	Agamia agami	Trinidad only - vagrant
Stripe-backed bittern	Ixobrychus involucris	Trinidad only
Least bittern	Ixobrychus exilis	Trinidad only
Pinnated bittern	Botaurus pinnatus	Trinidad only
Capped heron	Pilherodius pileatus	vagrant
Whistling heron	Syrigma sibilatrix	Trinidad only - vagrant
Little blue heron	Egretta caerulea	
Tricolored heron	Egretta tricolor	
Reddish egret	Egretta rufescens	vagrant
Snowy egret	Egretta thula	
Little egret	Egretta garzetta	
Western reef-heron	Egretta gularis	Trinidad only - vagrant
Yellow-crowned night-heron	Nyctanassa violacea	
Black-crowned night-heron	Nycticorax nycticorax	
Striated heron	Butorides striata	Trinidad only
Green heron	Butorides virescens virescens	Common Tobago, vagrant Trinidad
Squacco heron	Ardeola ralloides	vagrant
Cattle egret	Ardea ibis	
Great egret	Ardea alba	
Gray heron	Ardea cinerea	vagrant
Great blue heron	Ardea herodias	
Cocoi heron	Ardea cocoi	Common Trinidad, vagrant Tobago
Purple heron	Ardea purpurea	vagrant

== Ibises ==
Order: Pelecaniformes Family: Threskiornithidae

Threskiornithidae is a family of large terrestrial and wading birds which includes the ibises and spoonbills. They have long, broad wings with 11 primary and about 20 secondary feathers. They are strong fliers and despite their size and weight, very capable soarers.

Name	Binomial	Status
White ibis	Eudocimus albus	Trinidad only - vagrant
Scarlet ibis	Eudocimus ruber	Common Trinidad, vagrant Tobago
Glossy ibis	Plegadis falcinellus	
Buff-necked ibis	Theristicus caudatus	Trinidad only - vagrant
Eurasian spoonbill	Platalea leucorodia	vagrant
Roseate spoonbill	Platalea ajaja	vagrant

== New World vultures ==
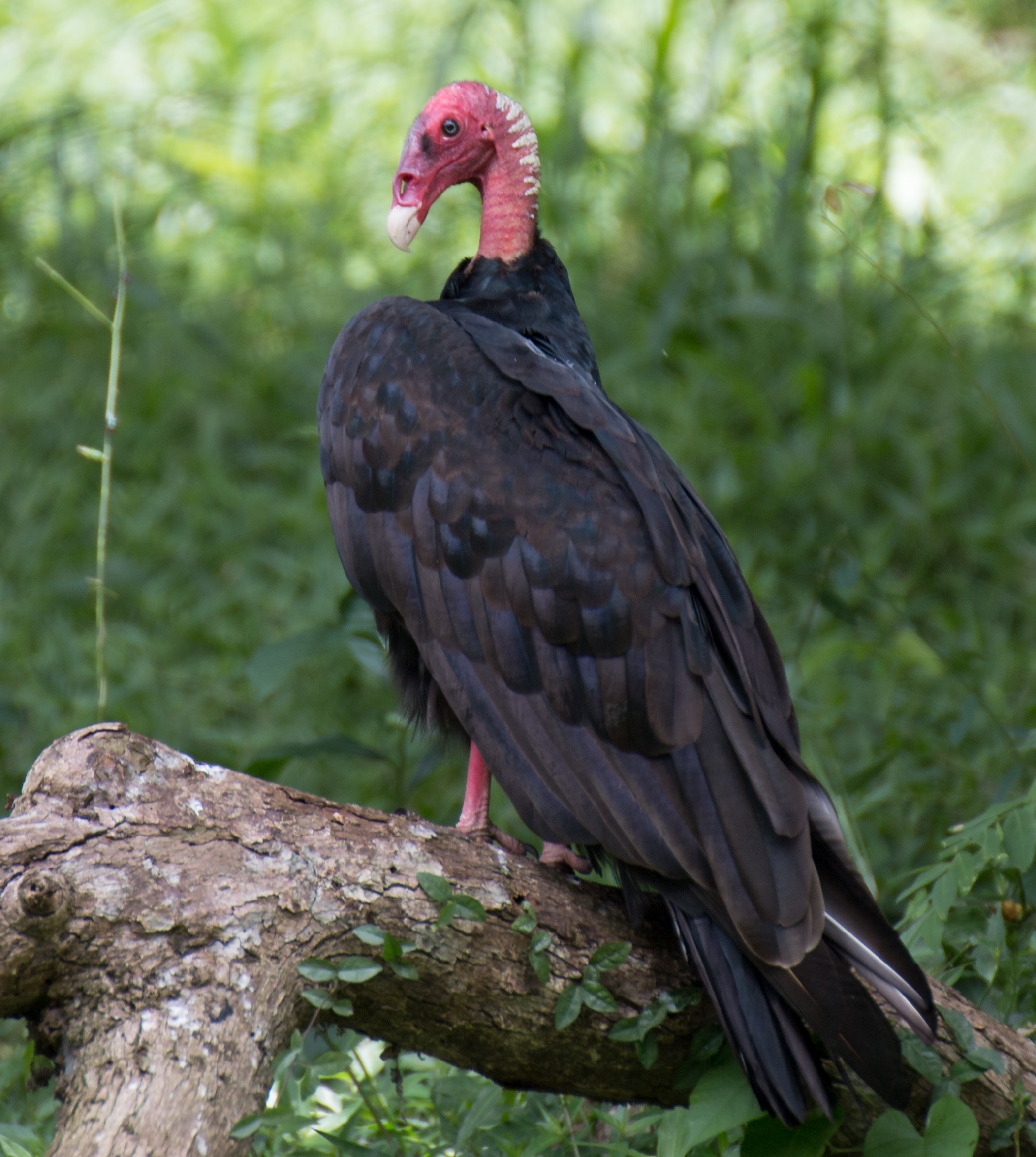
Turkey vulture, Trinidad

Order: Cathartiformes Family: Cathartidae

The New World vultures are not closely related to Old World vultures, but superficially resemble them because of convergent evolution. Like the Old World vultures, they are scavengers. However, unlike Old World vultures, which find carcasses by sight, New World vultures have a good sense of smell with which they locate carrion.

Name	Binomial	Status
King vulture	Sarcoramphus papa	Trinidad only - vagrant
Black vulture	Coragyps atratus	Common Trinidad, vagrant Tobago
Turkey vulture	Cathartes aura	Trinidad only

== Osprey ==
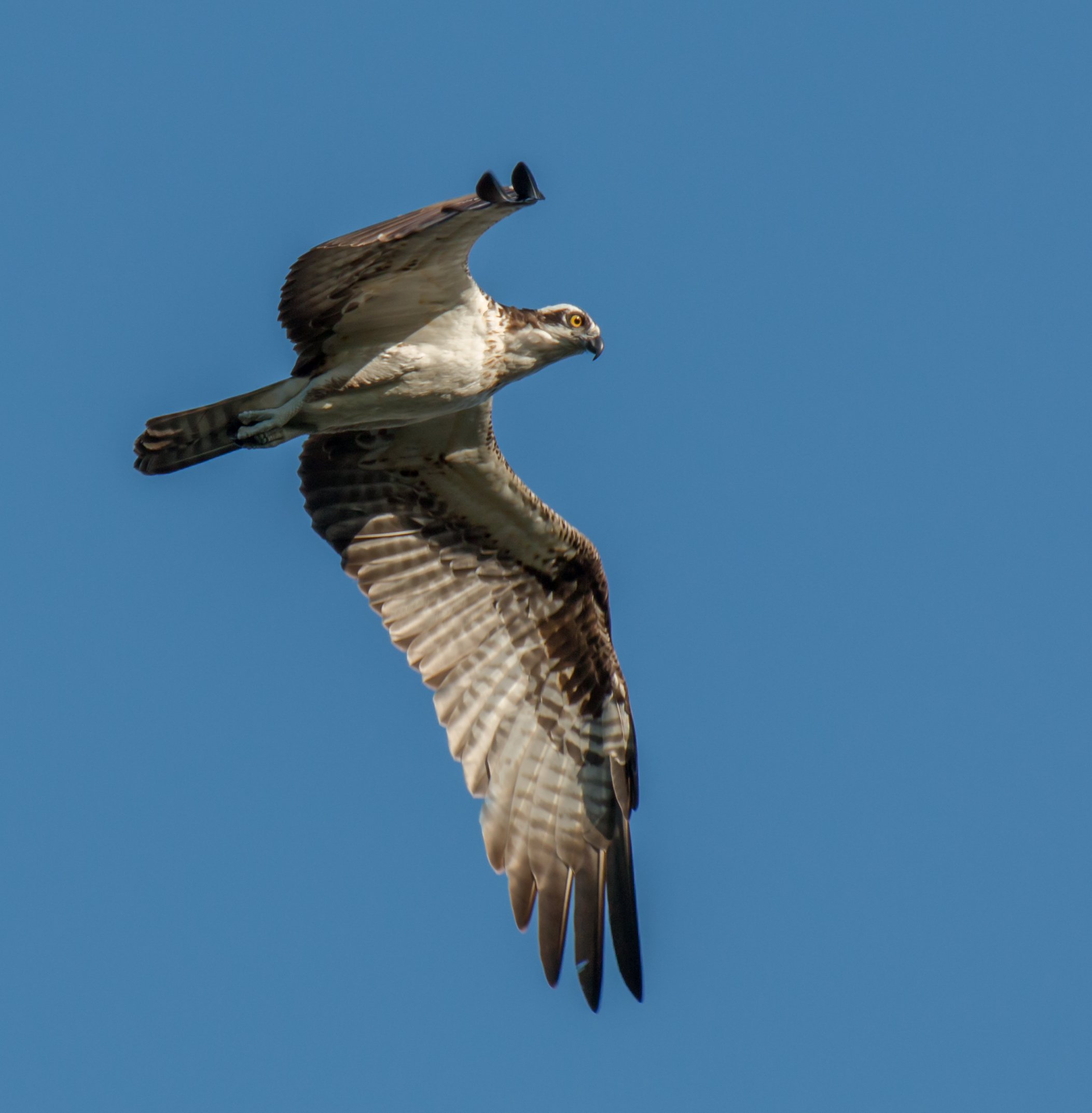
Osprey, Trinidad

Order: Accipitriformes Family: Pandionidae

The family Pandionidae contains only one species, the osprey. The osprey is a medium-large raptor which is a specialist fish-eater with a worldwide distribution.

Name	Binomial	Status
Osprey	Pandion haliaetus	

== Hawks ==
Order: Accipitriformes Family: Accipitridae

Accipitridae is a family of birds of prey which includes hawks, eagles, kites, harriers, and Old World vultures. These birds have powerful hooked beaks for tearing flesh from their prey, strong legs, powerful talons, and keen eyesight.

Name	Binomial	Status
Pearl kite	Gampsonyx swainsonii	Trinidad only
White-tailed kite	Elanus leucurus	Trinidad only - vagrant
Hook-billed kite	Chondrohierax uncinatus	
Gray-headed kite	Leptodon cayanensis	Trinidad only
Swallow-tailed kite	Elanoides forficatus	Common Trinidad, vagrant Tobago
Black hawk-eagle	Spizaetus tyrannus	Trinidad only
Ornate hawk-eagle	Spizaetus ornatus	Trinidad only, extirpated Tobago
Black-collared hawk	Busarellus nigricollis	Trinidad only - vagrant
Snail kite	Rostrhamus sociabilis	Trinidad only
Slender-billed kite	Helicolestes hamatus	Trinidad only - vagrant
Double-toothed kite	Harpagus bidentatus	Trinidad only
Plumbeous kite	Ictinia plumbea	Trinidad only
Long-winged harrier	Circus buffoni	Common Trinidad, vagrant Tobago
Black kite	Milvus migrans	Trinidad only - vagrant
Crane hawk	Geranospiza caerulescens	Trinidad only
Common black hawk	Buteogallus anthracinus	Common Trinidad, vagrant Tobago
Rufous crab hawk	Buteogallus aequinoctialis	Trinidad only
Savanna hawk	Buteogallus meridionalis	Common Trinidad, vagrant Tobago
Great black hawk	Buteogallus urubitinga	Common Tobago, vagrant Trinidad
Roadside hawk	Rupornis magnirostris	Trinidad only - vagrant
White-tailed hawk	Geranoaetus albicaudatus	Trinidad only - vagrant
White hawk	Pseudastur albicollis	Trinidad only
Gray-lined hawk	Buteo nitidus	Trinidad only
Broad-winged hawk	Buteo platypterus	
Short-tailed hawk	Buteo brachyurus	Trinidad only
Swainson's hawk	Buteo swainsoni	vagrant
Zone-tailed hawk	Buteo albonotatus	
Red-tailed hawk	Buteo jamaicensis	vagrant

== Barn owls ==
Order: Strigiformes Family: Tytonidae

Barn owls are medium to large owls with large heads and characteristic heart-shaped faces. They have long strong legs with powerful talons.

Common name	Binomial	Status
American barn owl	Tyto furcata	

== Owls ==
Order: Strigiformes Family: Strigidae

The typical owls are small to large solitary nocturnal birds of prey. They have large forward-facing eyes and ears, a hawk-like beak, and a conspicuous circle of feathers around each eye called a facial disk.

Common name	Binomial	Status
Tropical screech-owl	Megascops choliba	Trinidad only
Spectacled owl	Pulsatrix perspicillata	Trinidad only
Mottled owl	Strix virgata	Trinidad only
Ferruginous pygmy-owl	Gaucidium brasilianum	Trinidad only
Burrowing owl	Athene cunicularia	Trinidad only - vagrant
Striped owl	Asio clamator	Tobago only
Stygian owl	Asio stygius	Trinidad only - vagrant
Short-eared owl	Asio flammeus	Trinidad only - vagrant

== Trogons ==
Order: Trogoniformes Family: Trogonidae

The family Trogonidae includes trogons and quetzals. Found in tropical woodlands worldwide, they feed on insects and fruit, and their broad bills and weak legs reflect their diet and arboreal habits. Although their flight is fast, they are reluctant to fly any distance. Trogons have soft, often colorful, feathers with distinctive male and female plumage.

Common name	Binomial	Status
Green-backed trogon	Trogon viridis	Trinidad only
Guianan violaceous-trogon	Trogon violaceus	Trinidad only
Collared trogon	Trogon collaris	

== Motmots ==
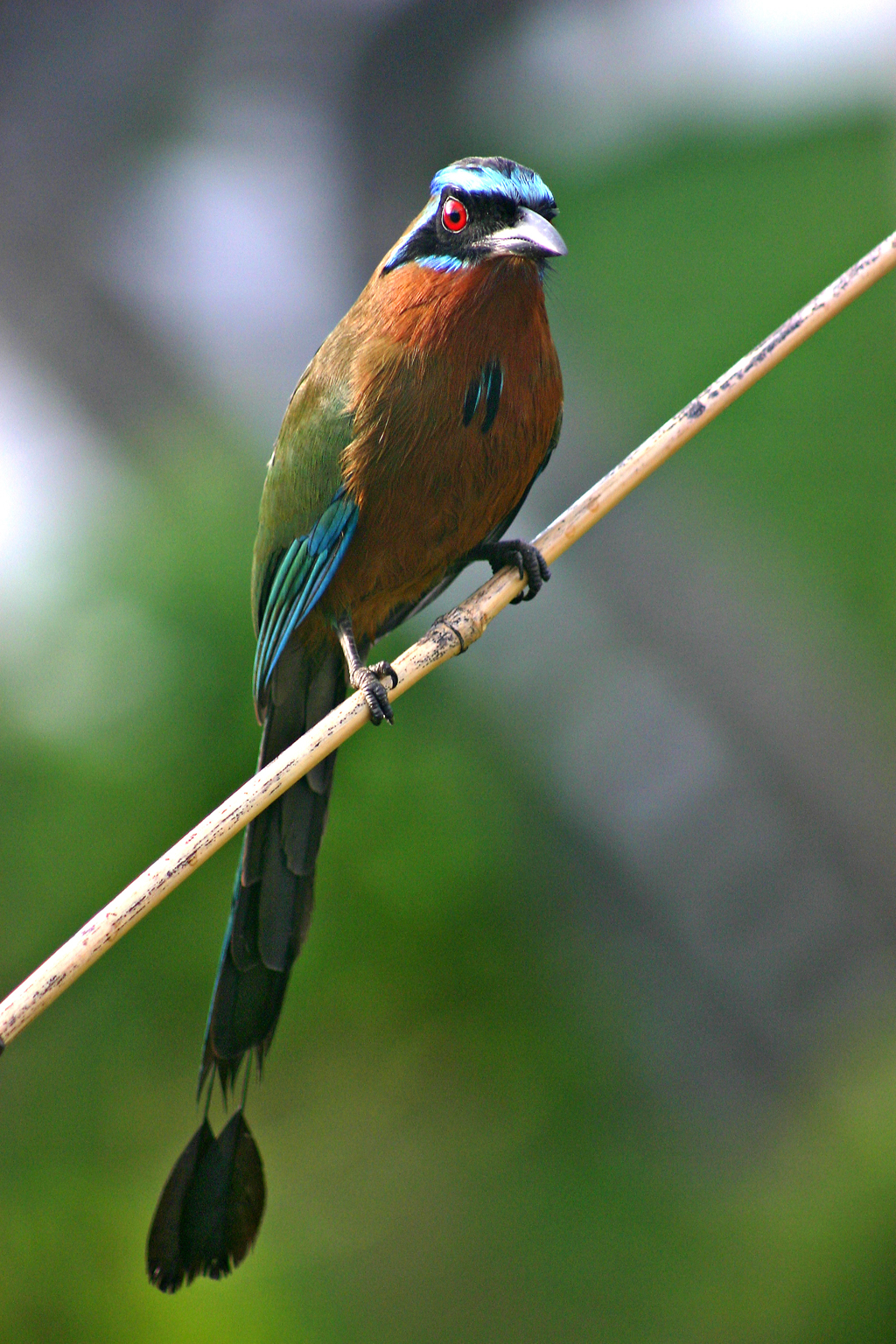
Trinidad motmot, Tobago

Order: Coraciiformes Family: Momotidae

The motmots have colorful plumage and long, graduated tails which they display by waggling back and forth. In most of the species, the barbs near the ends of the two longest (central) tail feathers are weak and fall off, leaving a length of bare shaft and creating a racket-shaped tail.

Common name	Binomial	Status
Trinidad motmot	Momotus bahamensis	endemic to main islands

== Kingfishers ==
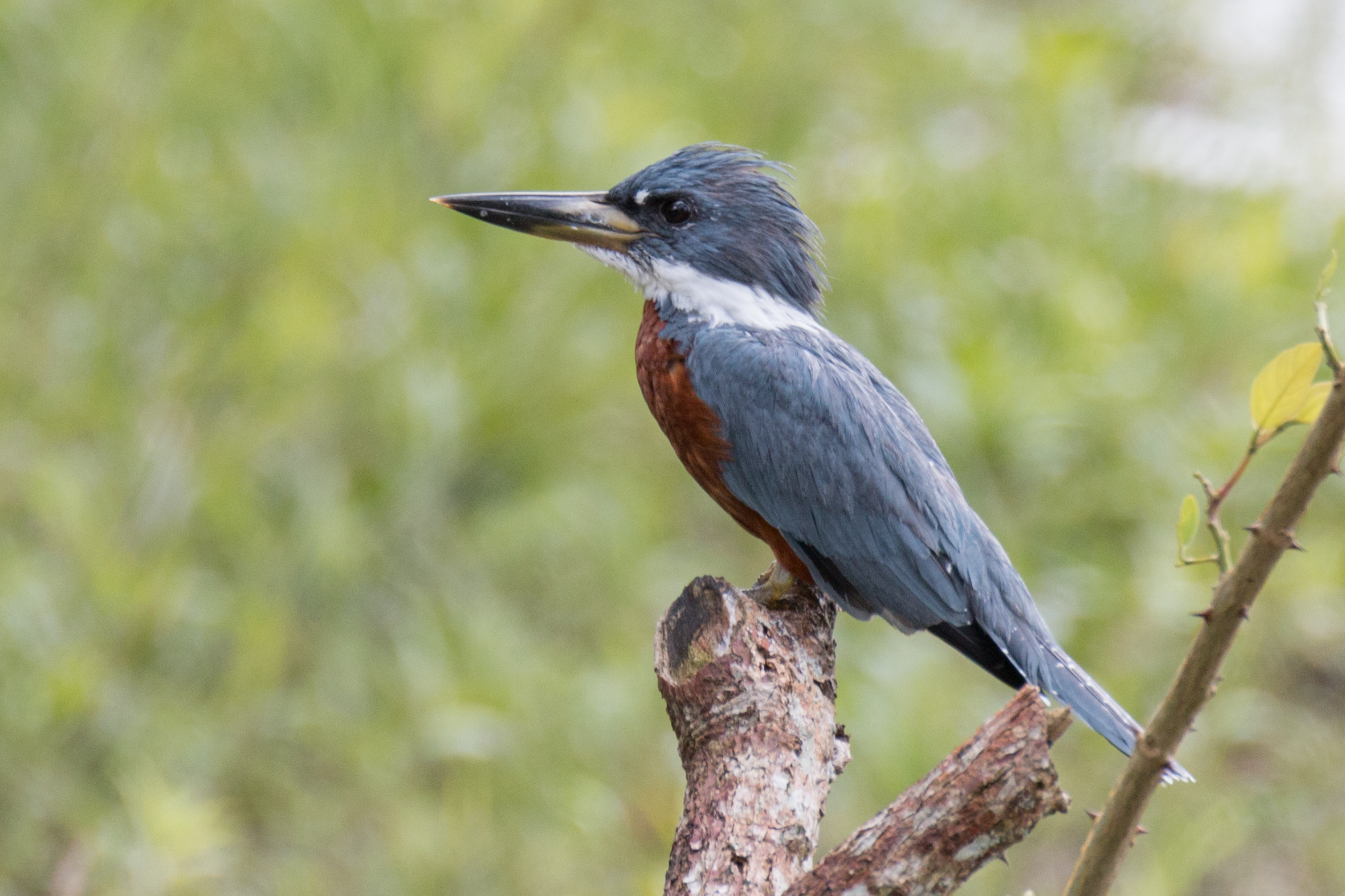
Ringed kingfisher, Trinidad

Order: Coraciiformes Family: Alcedinidae

Kingfishers are medium-sized birds with large heads, long pointed bills, short legs, and stubby tails.

Common name	Binomial	Status
Ringed kingfisher	Megaceryle torquata	Trinidad, vagrant to Tobago
Belted kingfisher	Megaceryle alcyon	
Amazon kingfisher	Chloroceryle amazona	Trinidad only - vagrant
American pygmy kingfisher	Chloroceryle aenea	Trinidad only
Green kingfisher	Chloroceryle americana	

== Jacamars ==
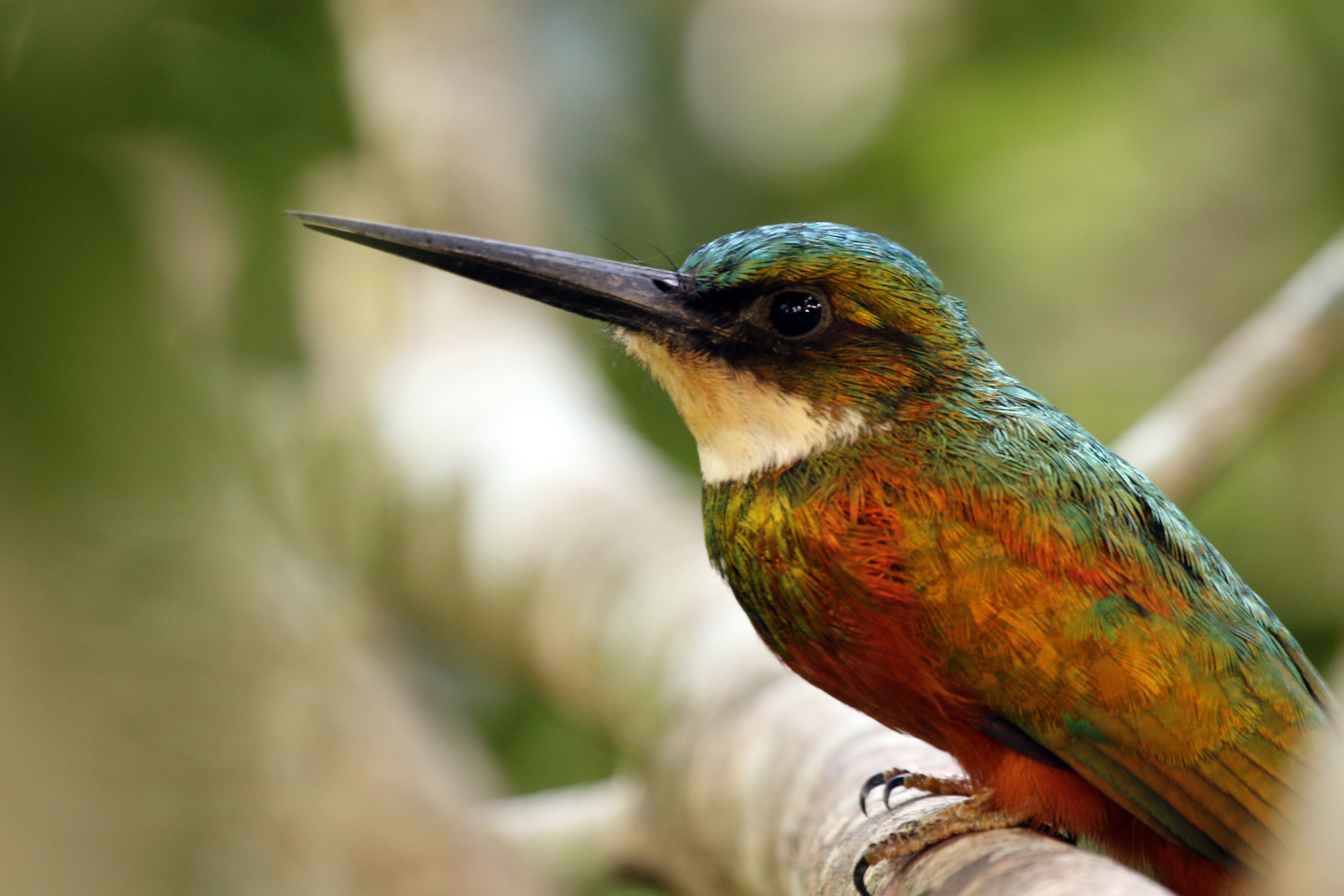
Rufous-tailed jacamar, Tobago

Order: Galbuliformes Family: Galbulidae

The jacamars are near passerine birds from tropical South America, with a range that extends up to Mexico. They feed on insects caught on the wing, and are glossy, elegant birds with long bills and tails. In appearance and behavior they resemble the Old World bee-eaters, although they are more closely related to woodpeckers.

Common name	Binomial	Status
Rufous-tailed jacamar	Galbula ruficauda	

== Toucans ==
Order: Piciformes Family: Ramphastidae

Toucans are near passerine birds from the Neotropics. They are brightly marked and have enormous, colorful bills which in some species amount to half their body length.

Common name	Binomial	Status
Channel-billed toucan	Ramphastos vitellinus	Trinidad only

== Woodpeckers ==
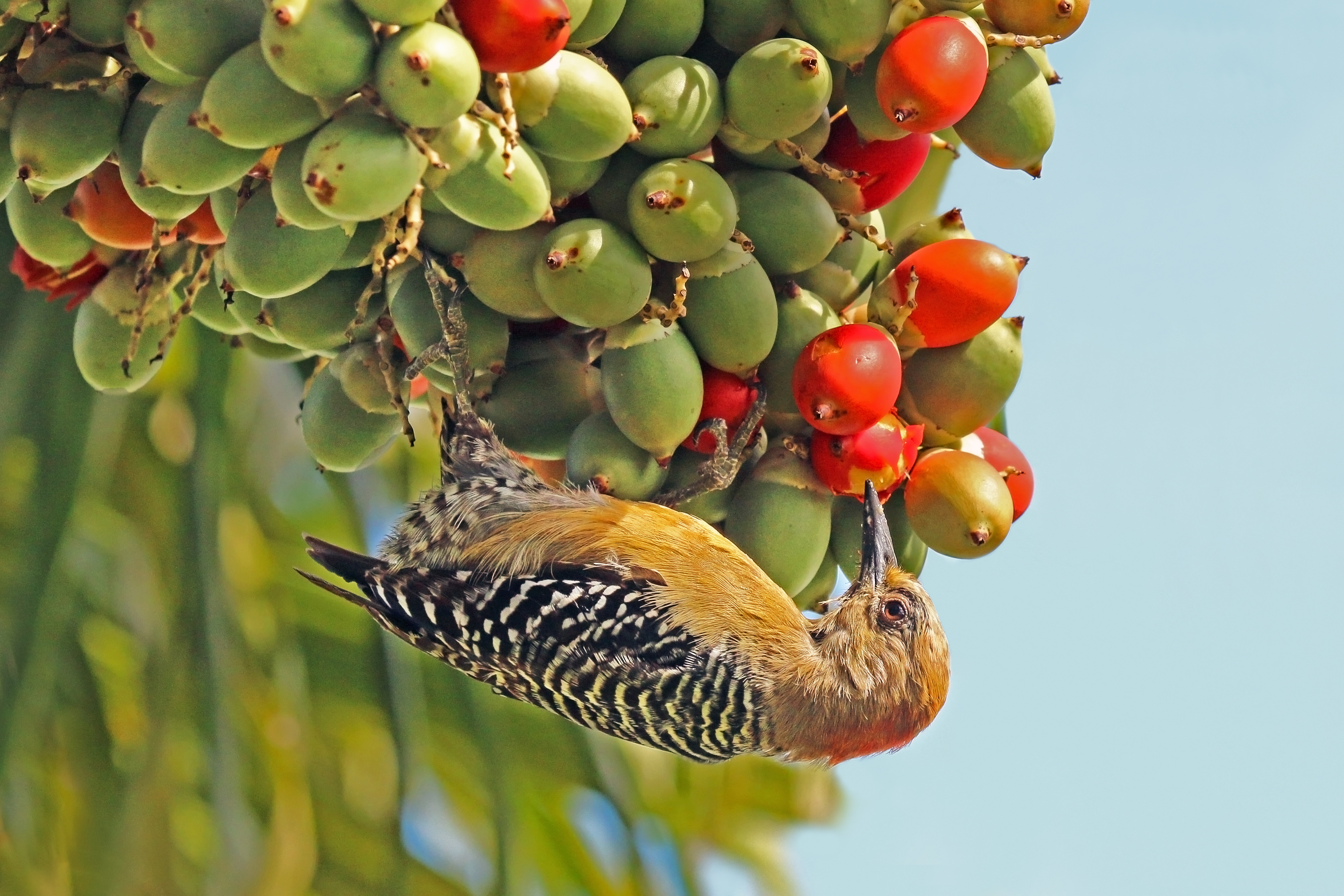
Red-crowned woodpecker, Tobago

Order: Piciformes Family: Picidae

Woodpeckers are small to medium-sized birds with chisel-like beaks, short legs, stiff tails, and long tongues used for capturing insects. Some species have feet with two toes pointing forward and two backward, while several species have only three toes. Many woodpeckers have the habit of tapping noisily on tree trunks with their beaks.

Common name	Binomial	Status
Red-crowned woodpecker	Melanerpes rubricapillus rubricapillus	Tobago only
Red-rumped woodpecker	Dryobates kirkii	
Crimson-crested woodpecker	Campephilus melanoleucos	Trinidad only
Lineated woodpecker	Dryocopus lineatus	Trinidad only
Chestnut woodpecker	Celeus elegans	Trinidad only
Golden-olive woodpecker	Piculus rubiginosus	

== Falcons ==
Peregrine falcon, Trinidad

Order: Falconiformes Family: Falconidae

Falconidae is a family of diurnal birds of prey. They differ from hawks, eagles, and kites in that they kill with their beaks instead of their talons.

Common name	Binomial	Status
Crested caracara	Caracara plancus	
Yellow-headed caracara	Milvago chimachima	
Eurasian kestrel	Falco tinnunculus	Trinidad only - vagrant
American kestrel	Falco sparverius	vagrant
Merlin	Falco columbarius	
Bat falcon	Falco rufigularis	Common Trinidad, vagrant Tobago
Orange-breasted falcon	Falco deiroleucus	Trinidad only - vagrant
Aplomado falcon	Falco femoralis	
Peregrine falcon	Falco peregrinus	

== New World and African parrots ==
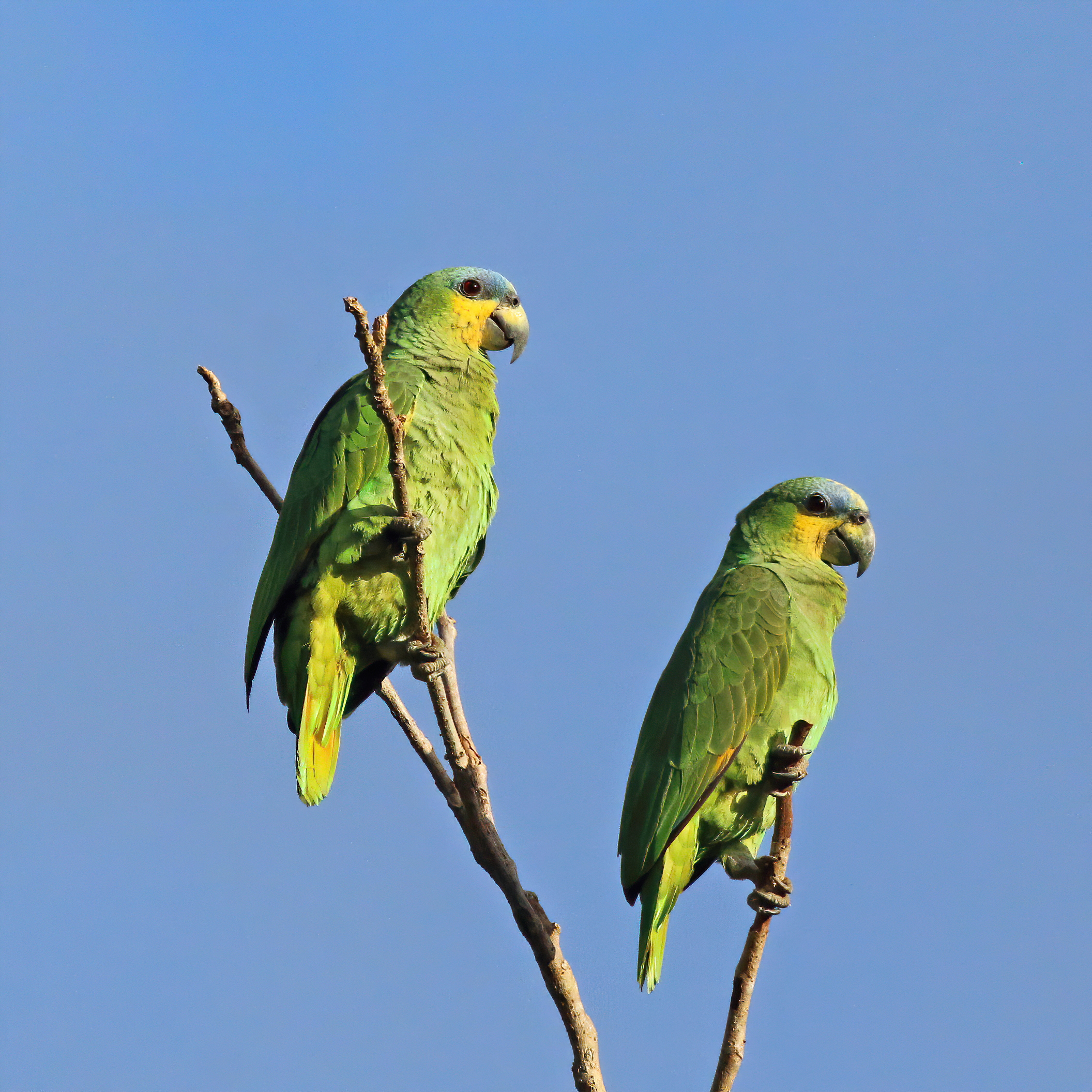
Orange-winged parrots, Tobago

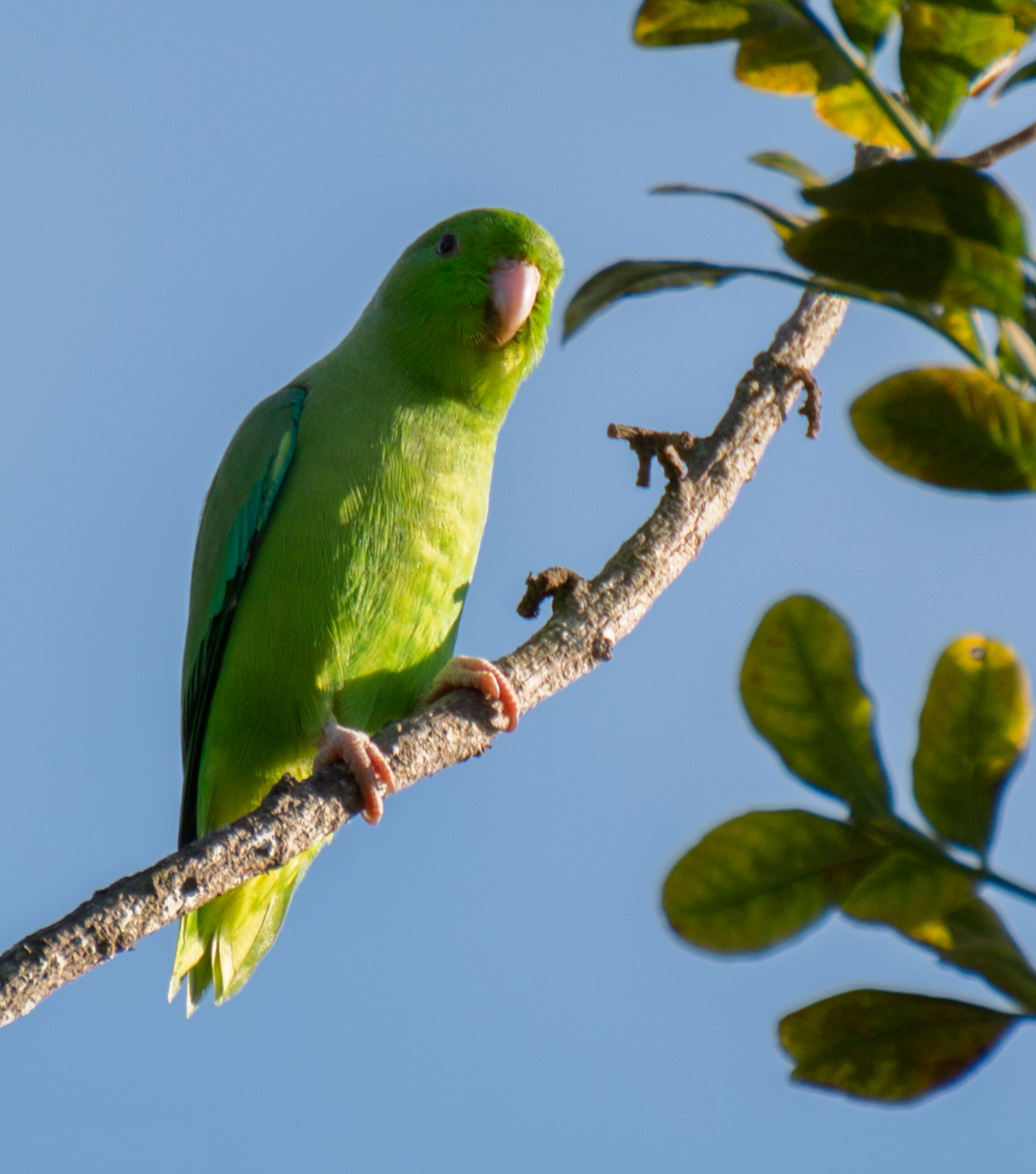
Green-rumped parrotlet, Trinidad

Order: Psittaciformes Family: Psittacidae

Parrots are small to large birds with a characteristic curved beak. Their upper mandibles have slight mobility in the joint with the skull and they have a generally erect stance. All parrots are zygodactyl, having the four toes on each foot placed two at the front and two to the back.

Name	Binomial	Status
Lilac-tailed parrotlet	Touit batavicus	Trinidad only
Scarlet-shouldered parrotlet	Touit huetii	vagrant
Blue-headed parrot	Pionus menstruus	Trinidad only
Yellow-crowned amazon	Amazona ochrocephala	Trinidad only
Orange-winged amazon	Amazona amazonica	
Green-rumped parrotlet	Forpus passerinus	
Brown-throated parakeet	Eupsittula pertinax	Trinidad only
Red-bellied macaw	Orthopsittaca manilatus	Trinidad only
Blue-and-yellow macaw	Ara ararauna	Trinidad only, reintroduced
Scarlet macaw	Ara macao	Trinidad only - vagrant
Red-and-green macaw	Ara chloropterus	Trinidad only - vagrant/population of unknown origin
White-eyed parakeet	Psittacara leucophthalmus	Trinidad only

== Antbirds ==
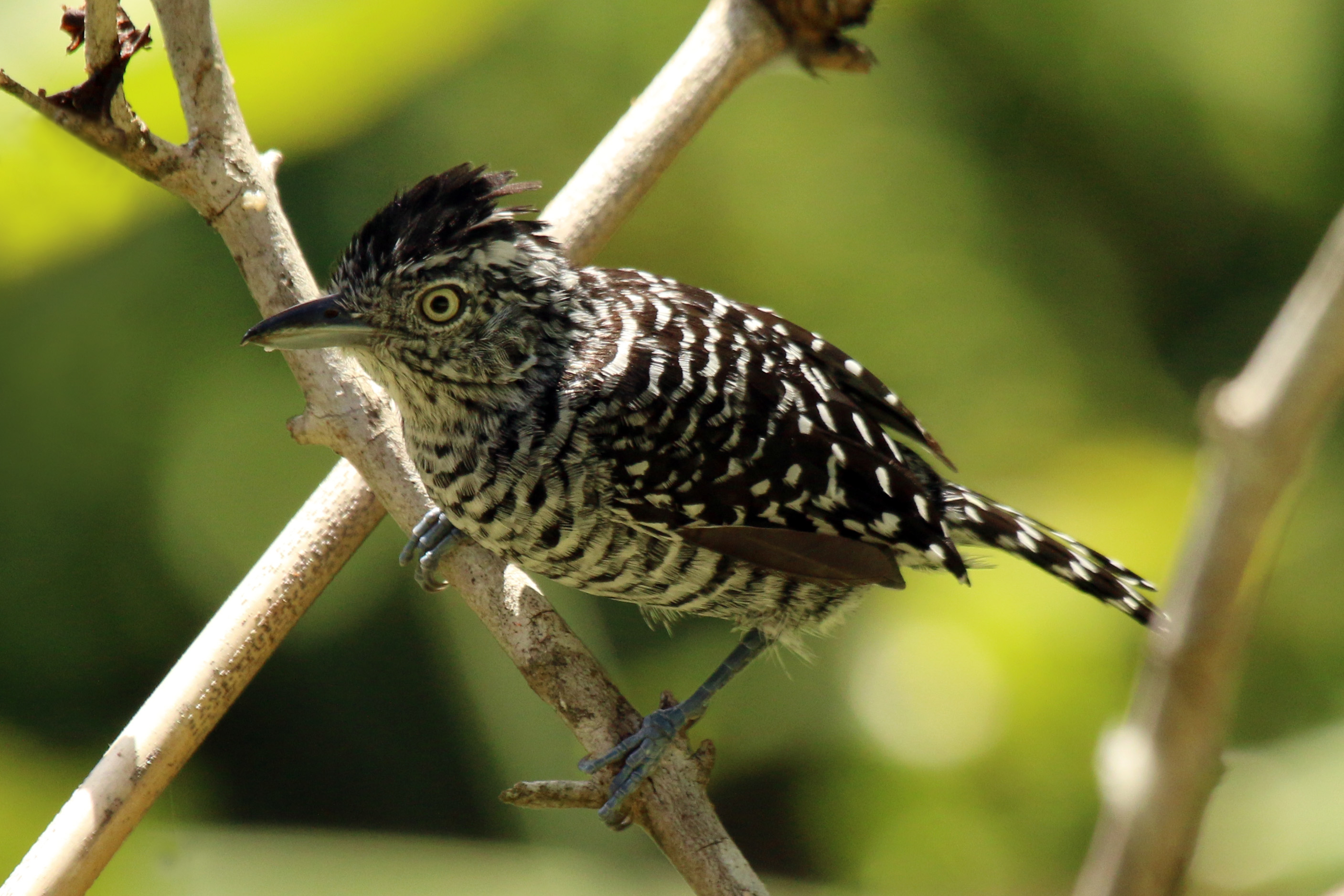
Barred antshrike, Tobago

Order: Passeriformes Family: Thamnophilidae

The antbirds are a large family of small passerine birds of subtropical and tropical Central and South America. They are forest birds which tend to feed on insects at or near the ground. A sizable minority of them specialize in following columns of army ants to eat small invertebrates that leave their hiding places to flee from the ants. Many species lack bright color; brown, black, and white being the dominant tones.

Common name	Binomial	Status
Great antshrike	Taraba major	Trinidad only
Black-crested antshrike	Sakesphorus canadensis	Trinidad only
Barred antshrike	Thamnophilus doliatus tobagensis	
Plain antvireo	Dysithamnus mentalis	
White-flanked antwren	Myrmotherula axillaris	Trinidad only
White-fringed antwren	Formicivora grisea	Tobago only
Silvered antbird	Sclateria naevia	Trinidad only
White-bellied antbird	Myrmeciza longipes	Trinidad only

== Antpittas ==
Order: Passeriformes Family: Grallariidae

Antpittas resemble the true pittas with strong, longish legs, very short tails, and stout bills.

Common name	Binomial	Status
Scaled antpitta	Grallaria guatimalensis	Trinidad only - vagrant

== Antthrushes ==
Order: Passeriformes Family: Formicariidae

Antthrushes resemble small rails with strong, longish legs, very short tails, and stout bills.

Common name	Binomial	Status
Black-faced antthrush	Formicarius analis	Trinidad only

== Ovenbirds ==
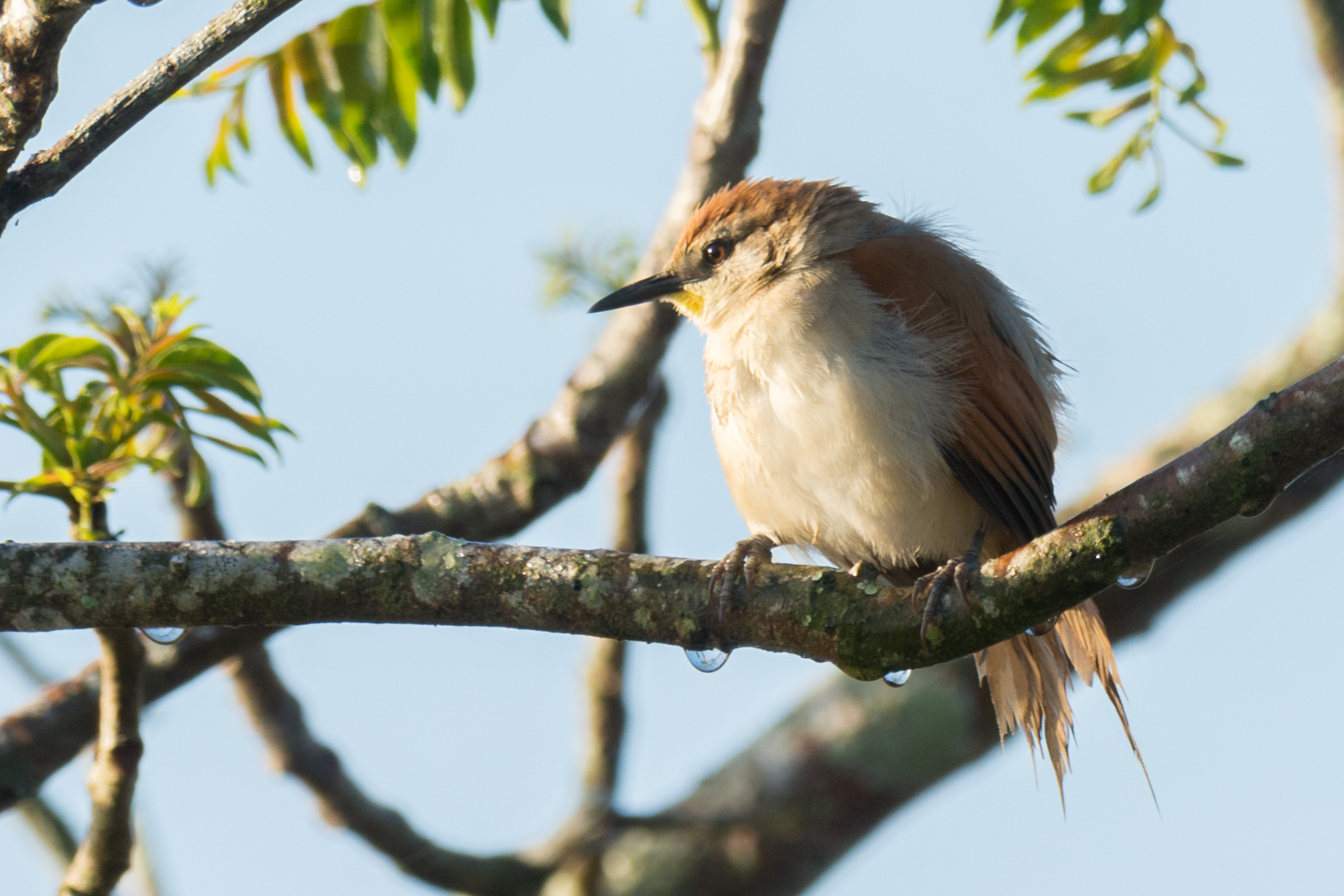
Yellow-chinned spinetail, Trinidad

Order: Passeriformes Family: Furnariidae

Ovenbirds comprise a large family of small sub-oscine passerine bird species found in Central and South America. They are a diverse group of insectivores which gets its name from the elaborate "oven-like" clay nests built by some species, although others build stick nests or nest in tunnels or clefts in rock. The woodcreepers are brownish birds which maintain an upright vertical posture, supported by their stiff tail vanes. They feed mainly on insects taken from tree trunks.

Common name	Binomial	Status
Gray-throated leaftosser	Sclerurus albigularis	
Olivaceous woodcreeper	Sittasomus griseicapillus	Tobago only
Plain-brown woodcreeper	Dendrocincla fuliginosa	
Cocoa woodcreeper	Xiphorhynchus susurrans	
Straight-billed woodcreeper	Dendroplex picus	Trinidad only
Streak-headed woodcreeper	Lepidocolaptes souleyetii	Trinidad only
Streaked xenops	Xenops rutilans	Trinidad only
Yellow-chinned spinetail	Certhiaxis cinnamomeus	Trinidad only
Pale-breasted spinetail	Synallaxis albescens	Trinidad only
Stripe-breasted spinetail	Synallaxis cinnamomea	

== Manakins ==
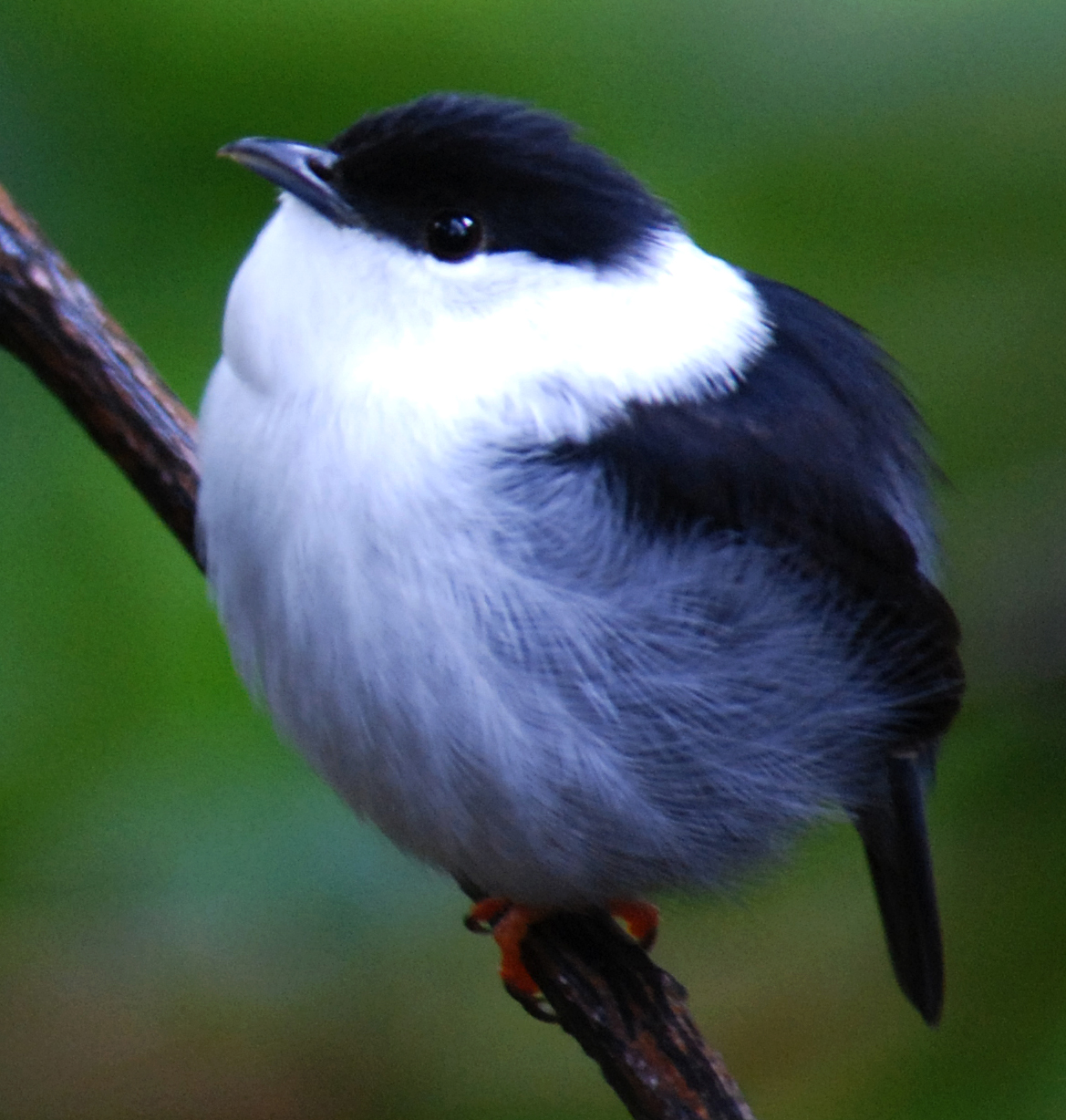
White-bearded manakin, Trinidad

Order: Passeriformes Family: Pipridae

The manakins are a family of subtropical and tropical mainland Central and South America, and Trinidad and Tobago. They are compact forest birds, the males typically being brightly colored, although the females of most species are duller and usually green-plumaged. Manakins feed on small fruits, berries and insects.

Common name	Binomial	Status
Blue-backed manakin	Chiroxiphia pareola	Tobago only
White-bearded manakin	Manacus manacus	Trinidad only
Golden-headed manakin	Pipra erythrocephala	Trinidad only

== Cotingas ==
Order: Passeriformes Family: Cotingidae

The cotingas are birds of forests or forest edges in tropical South America. Comparatively little is known about this diverse group, although all have broad bills with hooked tips, rounded wings and strong legs. The males of many of the species are brightly colored or decorated with plumes or wattles.

Common name	Binomial	Status
White bellbird	Procnias alba	Trinidad only - vagrant
Bearded bellbird	Procnias averano	Trinidad only

== Tityras ==
Order: Passeriformes Family: Tityridae

Tityridae are suboscine passerine birds found in forest and woodland in the Neotropics. They are small to medium-sized birds. They do not have the sophisticated vocal capabilities of the songbirds. Most, but not all, have plain coloring.

Common name	Binomial	Status
Black-tailed tityra	Tityra cayana	Trinidad only
White-winged becard	Pachyramphus polychopterus	

== Tyrant flycatchers ==
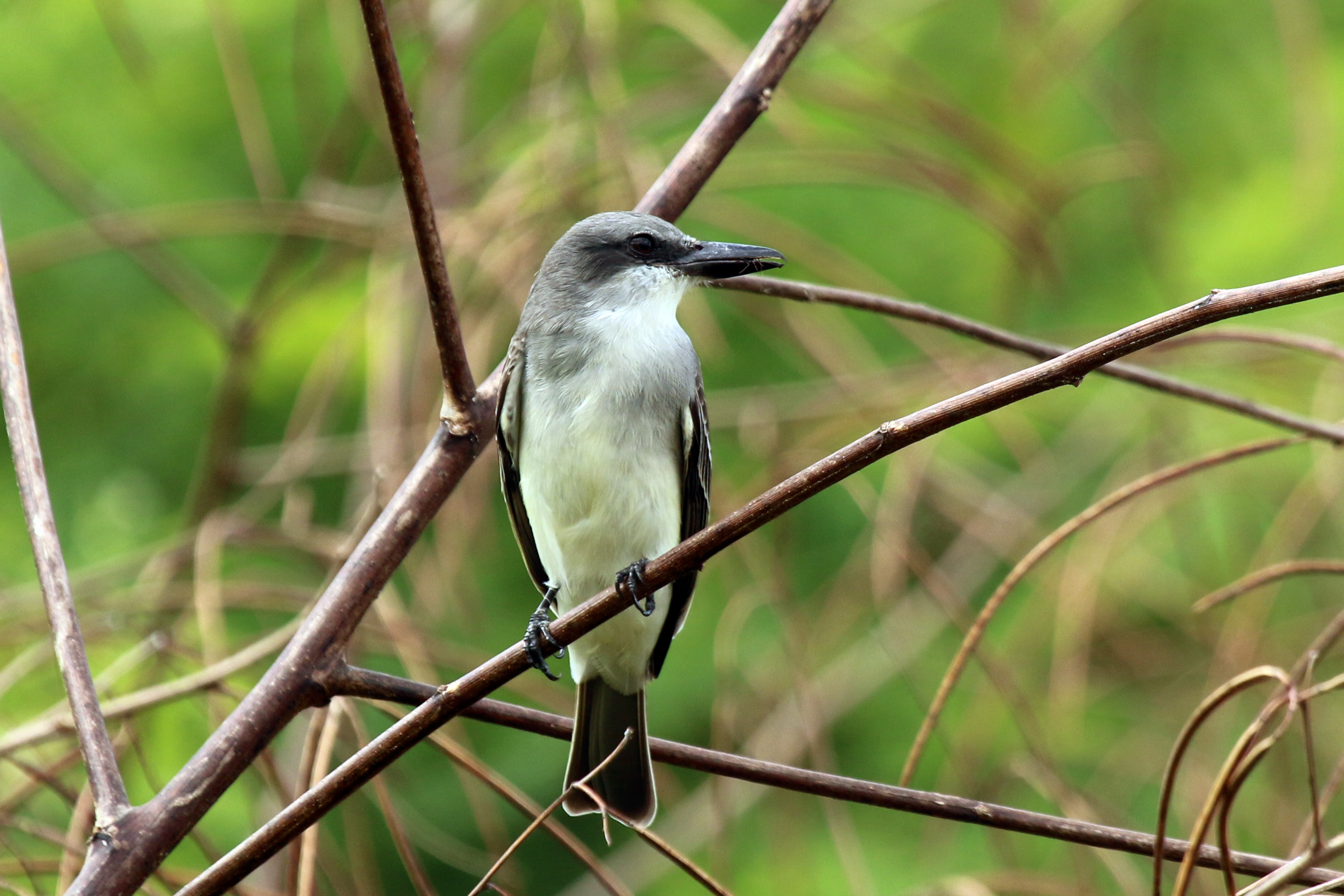
Gray kingbird, Tobago

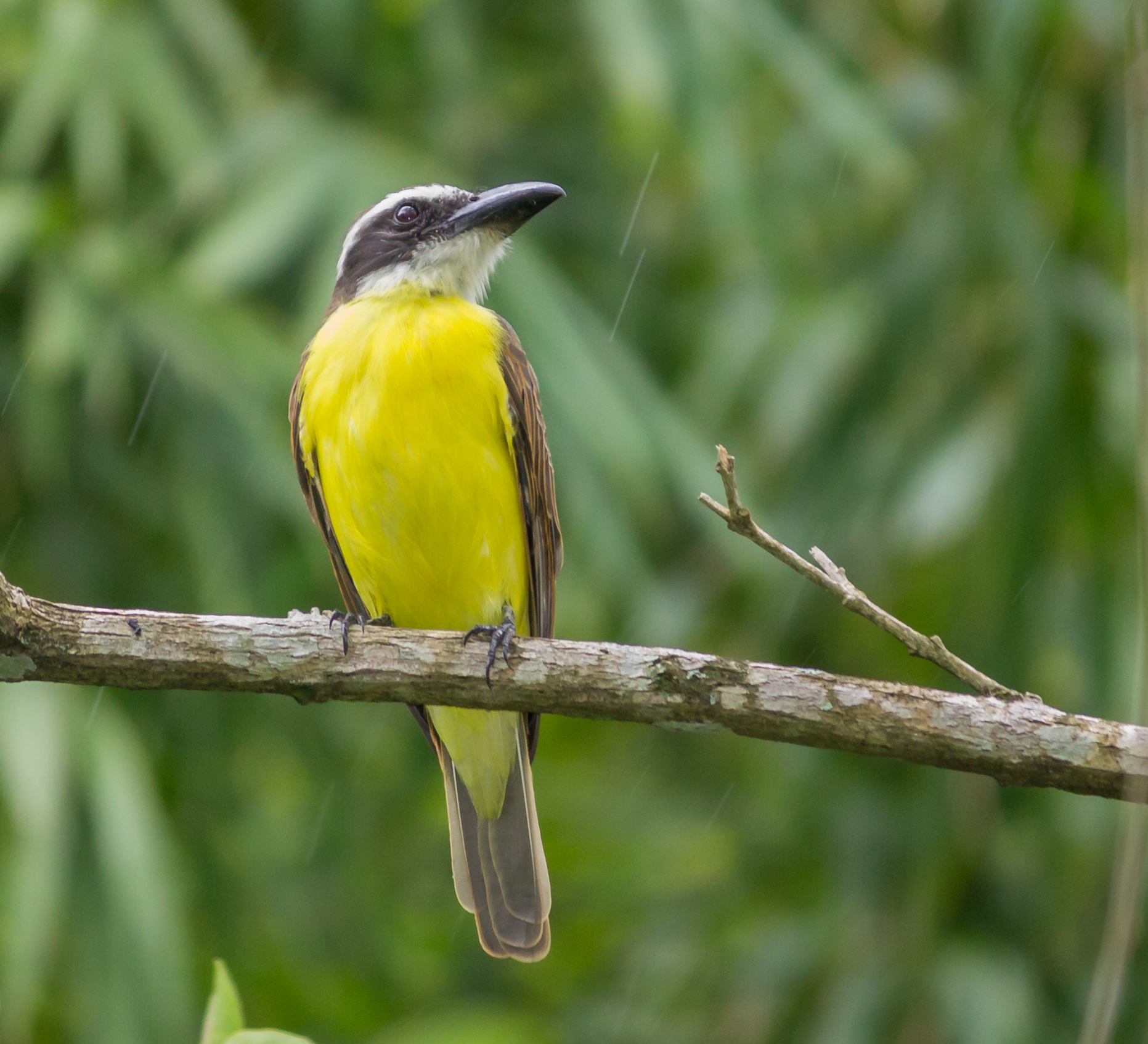
Boat-billed flycatcher, Trinidad

Order: Passeriformes Family: Tyrannidae

Tyrant flycatchers are passerine birds which occur throughout North and South America. They superficially resemble the Old World flycatchers, but are more robust and have stronger bills. They do not have the sophisticated vocal capabilities of the songbirds. Most, but not all, have plain coloring. As the name implies, most are insectivorous.

Common name	Binomial	Status
White-throated spadebill	Platyrinchus mystaceus	
Olive-striped flycatcher	Mionectes olivaceus	Trinidad only
Ochre-bellied flycatcher	Mionectes oleagineus	
Slaty-capped flycatcher	Leptopogon superciliaris	Trinidad only
Yellow-breasted flatbill	Tolmomyias flaviventris	
Yellow-olive flatbill	Tolmomyias sulphurescens	Trinidad only
Short-tailed pygmy-tyrant	Myiornis ecaudatus	Trinidad only
Spotted tody-flycatcher	Todirostrum maculatum	Trinidad only
Yellow-bellied elaenia	Elaenia flavogaster	
Small-billed elaenia	Elaenia parvirostris	Trinidad only
Slaty elaenia	Elaenia strepera	Trinidad only - vagrant
Lesser elaenia	Elaenia chiriquensis	Trinidad only
Forest elaenia	Myiopagis gaimardii	Trinidad only
Venezuelan beardless-tyrannulet	Camptostoma pusillum	Trinidad only
Mouse-colored tyrannulet	Nesotriccus murinus	Trinidad only
Crested doradito	Pseudocolopteryx sclateri	Trinidad only - vagrant
Bright-rumped attila	Attila spadiceus	Trinidad only
Piratic flycatcher	Legatus leucophaius	
Great kiskadee	Pitangus sulphuratus	Trinidad only
Sulphury flycatcher	Tyrannopsis sulphurea	Trinidad only
Boat-billed flycatcher	Megarynchus pitangua	Trinidad only
Streaked flycatcher	Myiodynastes maculatus	
Variegated flycatcher	Empidonomus varius	Trinidad only
Tropical kingbird	Tyrannus melancholicus	
Fork-tailed flycatcher	Tyrannus savana	
Eastern kingbird	Tyrannus tyrannus	Trinidad only - vagrant
Gray kingbird	Tyrannus dominicensis vorax	
Dusky-capped flycatcher	Myiarchus tuberculifer	Trinidad only
Swainson's flycatcher	Myiarchus swainsoni	Trinidad only - vagrant
Venezuelan flycatcher	Myiarchus venezuelensis	Tobago only
Brown-crested flycatcher	Myiarchus tyrannulus	
Bran-colored flycatcher	Myiophobus fasciatus	Trinidad only
Northern scrub-flycatcher	Sublegatus arenarum	Trinidad only
Pied water tyrant	Fluvicola pica	Trinidad only
White-headed marsh tyrant	Arundinicola leucocephala	Trinidad only
Fuscous flycatcher	Cnemotriccus fuscatus	
Euler's flycatcher	Lathrotriccus euleri	Trinidad only
Olive-sided flycatcher	Contopus cooperi	Trinidad only
Eastern wood-pewee	Contopus virens	Trinidad only - vagrant
Tropical pewee	Contopus cinereus	Trinidad only

== Vireos ==
Rufous-browed peppershrike, Trinidad

Order: Passeriformes Family: Vireonidae

The vireos are a group of small to medium-sized passerine birds. They are typically greenish in color and resemble New World warblers apart from their heavier bills.

Common name	Binomial	Status
Rufous-browed peppershrike	Cyclarhis gujanensis	Trinidad only
Scrub greenlet	Hylophilus flavipes	Tobago only
Golden-fronted greenlet	Pachysylvia aurantiifrons	Trinidad only
White-eyed vireo	Vireo griseus	vagrant; Trinidad only
Yellow-throated vireo	Vireo flavifrons	vagrant
Red-eyed vireo	Vireo olivaceus	
Chivi vireo	Vireo chivi	
Black-whiskered vireo	Vireo altiloquus	

== Swallows ==
Order: Passeriformes Family: Hirundinidae

The family Hirundinidae is adapted to aerial feeding. They have a slender streamlined body, long pointed wings, and a short bill with a wide gape. The feet are adapted to perching rather than walking, and the front toes are partially joined at the base.

Common name	Binomial	Status
Blue-and-white swallow	Pygochelidon cyanoleuca	Trinidad only - vagrant
Southern rough-winged swallow	Stelgidopteryx ruficollis	Common Trinidad, vagrant Tobago
Caribbean martin	Progne dominicensis	vagrant Trinidad, common Tobago
Gray-breasted martin	Progne chalybea	Trinidad only
White-winged swallow	Tachycineta albiventer	
Bank swallow	Riparia riparia	
Barn swallow	Hirundo rustica	
Cliff swallow	Petrochelidon pyrrhonota	

== Wrens ==
Order: Passeriformes Family: Troglodytidae

The wrens are mainly small and inconspicuous except for their loud songs. These birds have short wings and thin down-turned bills. Several species often hold their tails upright. All are insectivorous.

Common name	Binomial	Status
Southern house-wren	Troglodytes musculus	
Rufous-breasted wren	Pheugopedius rutilus	

== Gnatcatchers ==
Order: Passeriformes Family: Polioptilidae

These dainty birds resemble Old World warblers in their build and habits, moving restlessly through the foliage seeking insects. The gnatcatchers and gnatwrens are mainly soft bluish gray in color and have the typical insectivore's long sharp bill. They are birds of fairly open woodland or scrub, which nest in bushes or trees.

Common name	Binomial	Status
Trilling gnatwren	Ramphocaenus melanurus	Trinidad only

== Thrushes ==
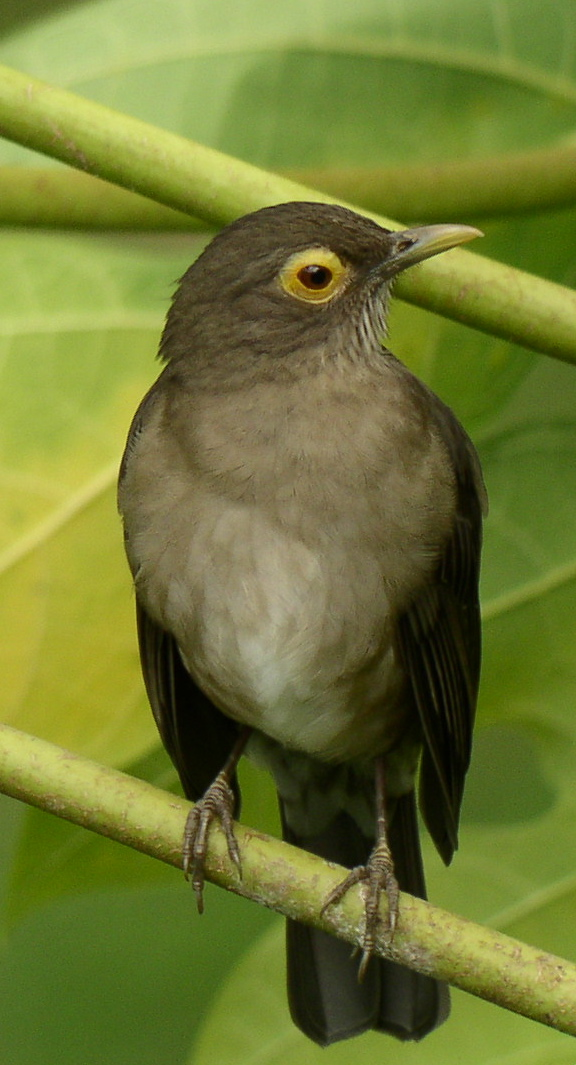
Spectacled thrush, Tobago

Order: Passeriformes Family: Turdidae

The thrushes are a group of passerine birds that occur mainly in the Old World. They are plump, soft plumaged, small to medium-sized insectivores or sometimes omnivores, often feeding on the ground. Many have attractive songs.

Common name	Binomial	Status
Orange-billed nightingale-thrush	Catharus aurantiirostris	Trinidad only
Veery	Catharus fuscescens	Trinidad only - vagrant
Gray-cheeked thrush	Catharus minimus	Trinidad only - vagrant
Yellow-legged thrush	Turdus flavipes	
Cocoa thrush	Turdus fumigatus	Trinidad only
Spectacled thrush	Turdus nudigenis	
Gray-flanked thrush	Turdus phaeopygus	

== Mockingbirds ==
Order: Passeriformes Family: Mimidae

The mimids are a family of passerine birds that includes thrashers, mockingbirds, tremblers, and the New World catbirds. These birds are notable for their vocalizations, especially their ability to mimic a wide variety of birds and other sounds heard outdoors. Their coloring tends towards dull-grays and browns.

Common name	Binomial	Status
Tropical mockingbird	Mimus gilvus	

== Weavers ==
Order: Passeriformes Family: Ploceidae

The weavers are small passerine birds related to the finches. They are seed-eating birds with rounded conical bills. The males of many species are brightly colored, usually in red or yellow and black, some species show variation in color only in the breeding season.

Common name	Binomial	Status
Village weaver (not on the BDSC list)	Ploceus cucullatus	introduced species

== Estreldids ==
Order: Passeriformes Family: Estrildidae

The estrildid finches are small passerine birds of the Old World tropics and Australasia. They are gregarious and often colonial seed eaters with short thick but pointed bills. They are all similar in structure and habits, but have wide variation in plumage colors and patterns.

Common name	Binomial	Status
Common waxbill	Estrilda astrild	Trinidad, accidental Tobago - introduced species
Tricolored munia	Lonchura malacca	Trinidad only - introduced species

== Old World sparrows ==
Order: Passeriformes Family: Passeridae

Sparrows are small passerine birds. In general, sparrows tend to be small, plump, brown or gray birds with short tails and short powerful beaks. Sparrows are seed eaters, but they also consume small insects.

Common name	Binomial	Status
House sparrow	Passer domesticus	Trinidad only - Introduced species

== Pipits and wagtails ==
Order: Passeriformes Family: Motacillidae

Motacillidae is a family of small passerine birds with medium to long tails. They include the wagtails, longclaws and pipits. They are slender ground-feeding insectivores of open country.

Common name	Binomial	Status
White wagtail	Motacilla alba	vagrant

== Finches ==
Order: Passeriformes Family: Fringillidae

Finches are seed-eating passerine birds, that are small to moderately large and have a strong beak, usually conical and in some species very large. All have twelve tail feathers and nine primaries. These birds have a bouncing flight with alternating bouts of flapping and gliding on closed wings, and most sing well.

Common name	Binomial	Status
Red siskin	Carduelis cucullata	Trinidad only - extirpated
Lesser goldfinch	Spinus psaltria	Trinidad only - vagrant
Golden-rumped euphonia	Chlorophonia cyanocephala	Trinidad only - extirpated
Trinidad euphonia	Euphonia trinitatis	Trinidad only
Violaceous euphonia	Euphonia violacea	

== Blackbirds ==
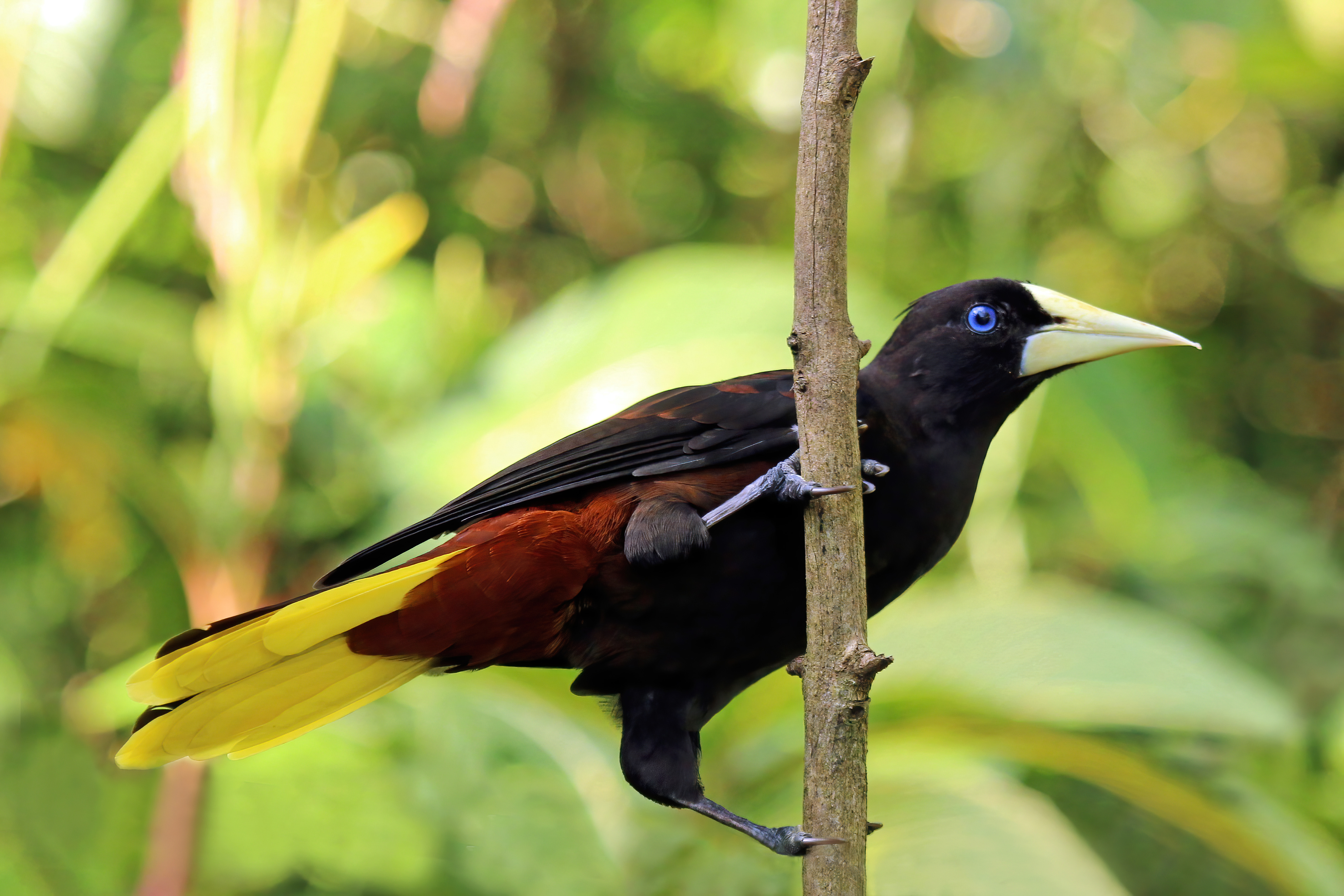
Crested oropendola, subspecies insularis, Trinidad

Order: Passeriformes Family: Icteridae

The icterids are a group of small to medium-sized, often colorful, passerine birds restricted to the New World and include the grackles, New World blackbirds, and New World orioles. Most species have black as the predominant plumage color, often enlivened by yellow, orange, or red.

Common name	Binomial	Status
Bobolink	Dolichonyx oryzivorus	
Red-breasted meadowlark	Leistes militaris	Common Trinidad, vagrant Tobago
Crested oropendola	Psarocolius decumanus	
Yellow-rumped cacique	Cacicus cela	Trinidad only
Epaulet oriole (moriche)	Icterus cayanensis chrysocephalus	Trinidad only
Orchard oriole	Icterus spurius	Trinidad only - vagrant
Baltimore oriole	Icterus galbula	vagrant
Yellow oriole	Icterus nigrogularis	Trinidad only
Red-winged blackbird	Agelaius phoeniceus	Trinidad only - vagrant
Giant cowbird	Molothrus oryzivorus	
Shiny cowbird	Molothrus bonariensis	
Carib grackle	Quiscalus lugubris	
Great-tailed grackle	Quiscalus mexicanus	Trinidad only - vagrant
Yellow-hooded blackbird	Chrysomus icterocephalus	Trinidad only

== Wood-warblers ==
Masked yellowthroat, Trinidad

Order: Passeriformes Family: Parulidae

The wood-warblers are a group of small, often colorful, passerine birds restricted to the New World. Most are arboreal, but some are terrestrial. Most members of this family are insectivores.

Common name	Binomial	Status
Ovenbird	Seiurus aurocapilla	vagrant
Northern waterthrush	Parkesia noveboracensis	
Golden-winged warbler	Vermivora chrysoptera	vagrant
Black-and-white warbler	Mniotilta varia	vagrant
Prothonotary warbler	Protonotaria citrea	
Tennessee warbler	Leiothlypis peregrina	Trinidad only - vagrant
Masked yellowthroat	Geothlypis aequinoctialis	Trinidad only
Kentucky warbler	Geothlypis formosa	Trinidad only - vagrant
Common yellowthroat	Geothlypis trichas	Trinidad only - vagrant
Hooded warbler	Setophaga citrina	Trinidad only - vagrant
American redstart	Setophaga ruticilla	
Cape May warbler	Setophaga tigrina	vagrant
Cerulean warbler	Setophaga cerulea	vagrant
Northern parula	Setophaga americana	vagrant
Tropical parula	Setophaga pitiayumi	Trinidad only
Magnolia warbler	Setophaga magnolia	vagrant
Bay-breasted warbler	Setophaga castanea	vagrant
Blackburnian warbler	Setophaga fusca	Trinidad only - vagrant
Yellow warbler	Setophaga petechia	
Chestnut-sided warbler	Setophaga pensylvanica	Trinidad only - vagrant
Blackpoll warbler	Setophaga striata	
Black-throated blue warbler	Setophaga caerulescens	Trinidad only - vagrant
Yellow-rumped warbler	Setophaga coronata	Tobago only - vagrant
Prairie warbler	Setophaga discolor	Trinidad only - vagrant
Black-throated green warbler	Setophaga virens	Trinidad only - vagrant
Golden-crowned warbler	Basileuterus culicivorus	Trinidad only
Canada warbler	Cardellina canadensis	Trinidad only - vagrant

== Cardinal grosbeaks ==
Order: Passeriformes Family: Cardinalidae

The cardinals are a family of robust, seed-eating birds with strong bills. They are typically associated with open woodland. The sexes usually have distinct plumages.

Common name	Binomial	Status
Hepatic tanager	Piranga flava	Trinidad only
Summer tanager	Piranga rubra	
Scarlet tanager	Piranga olivacea	vagrant
Red-crowned ant-tanager	Habia rubica	Trinidad only
Rose-breasted grosbeak	Pheucticus ludovicianus	vagrant
Indigo bunting	Passerina cyanea	Trinidad only - vagrant
Dickcissel	Spiza americana	Common Trinidad, vagrant Tobago

== Tanagers ==
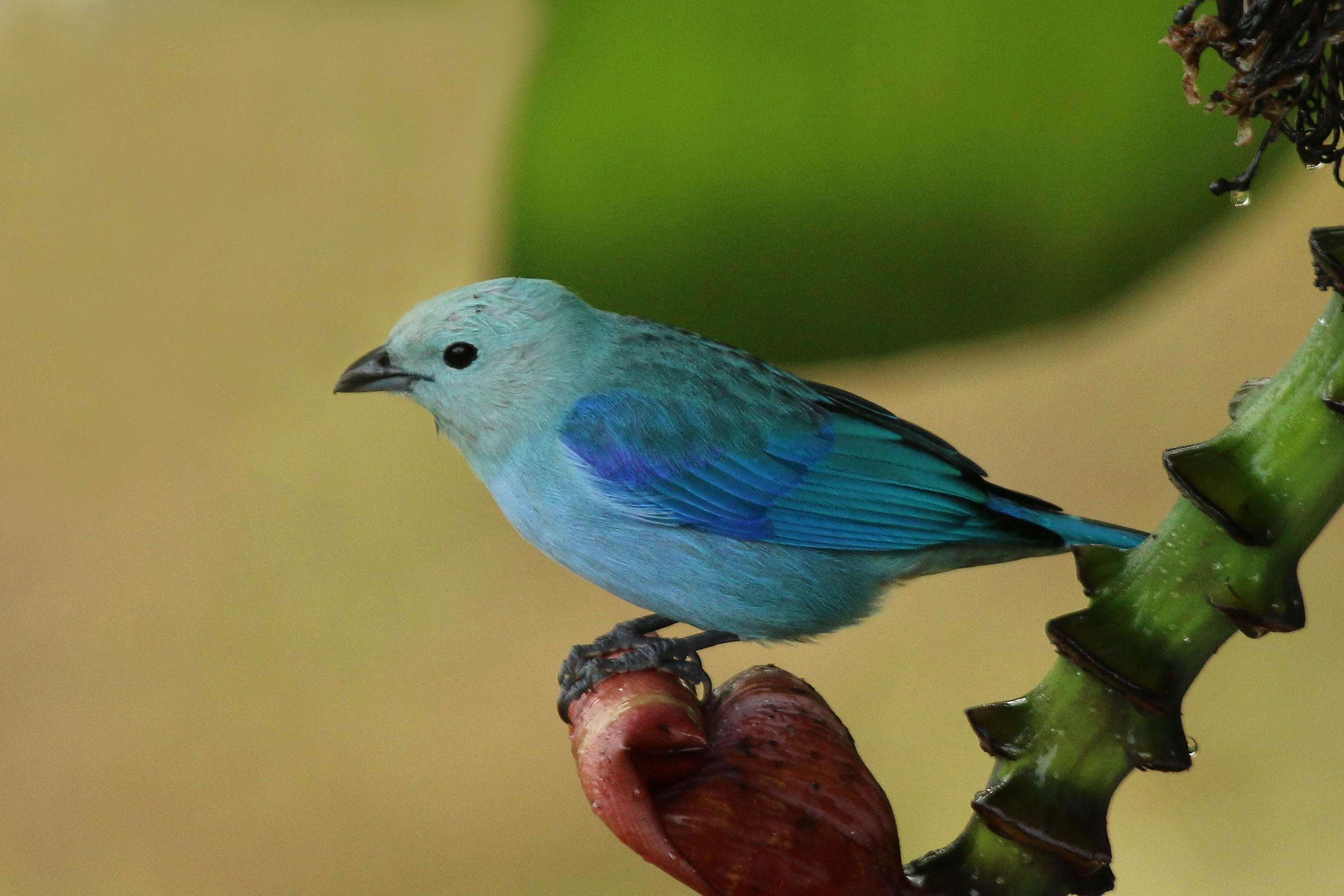
Blue-gray tanager, Tobago

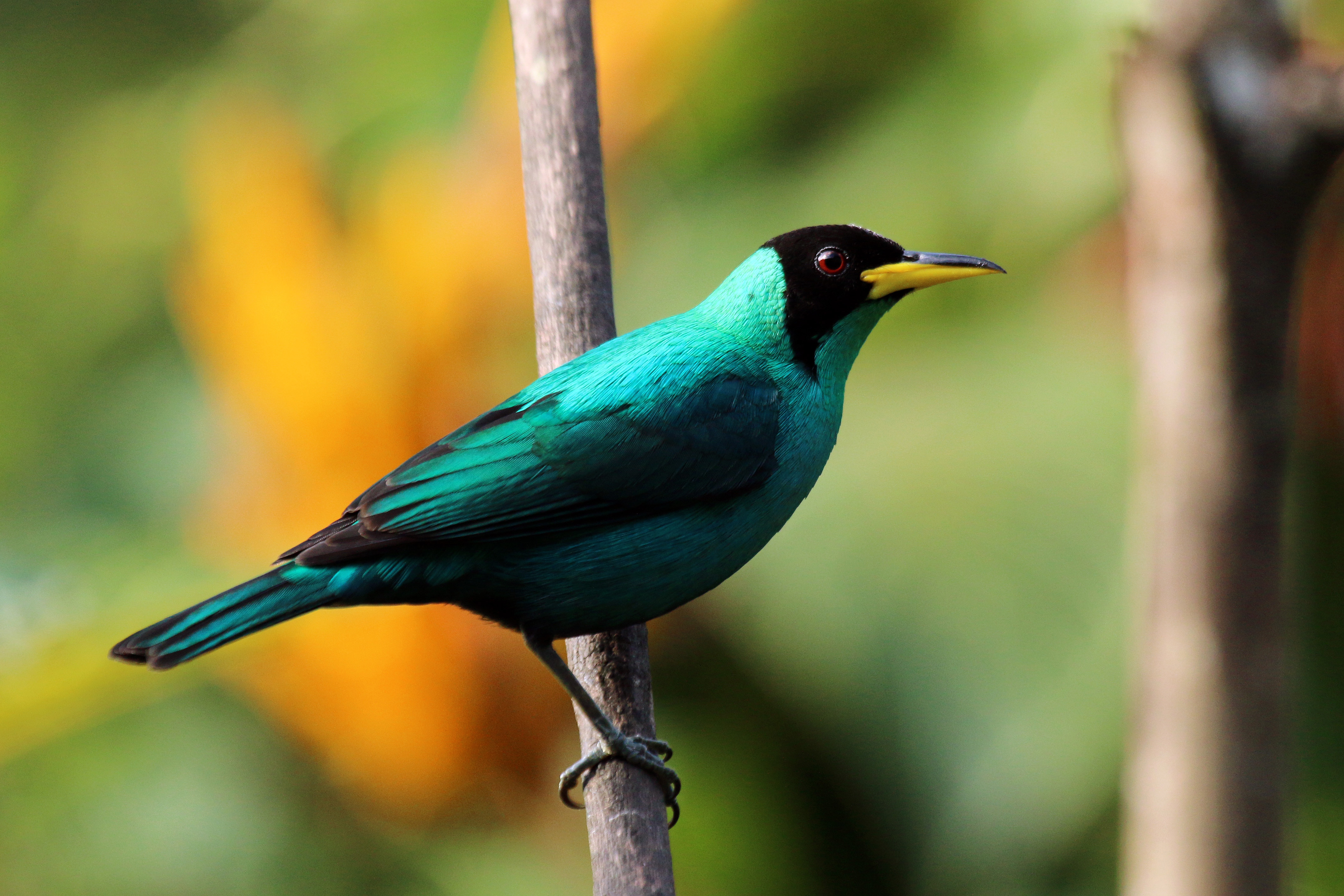
Green honeycreeper, Trinidad

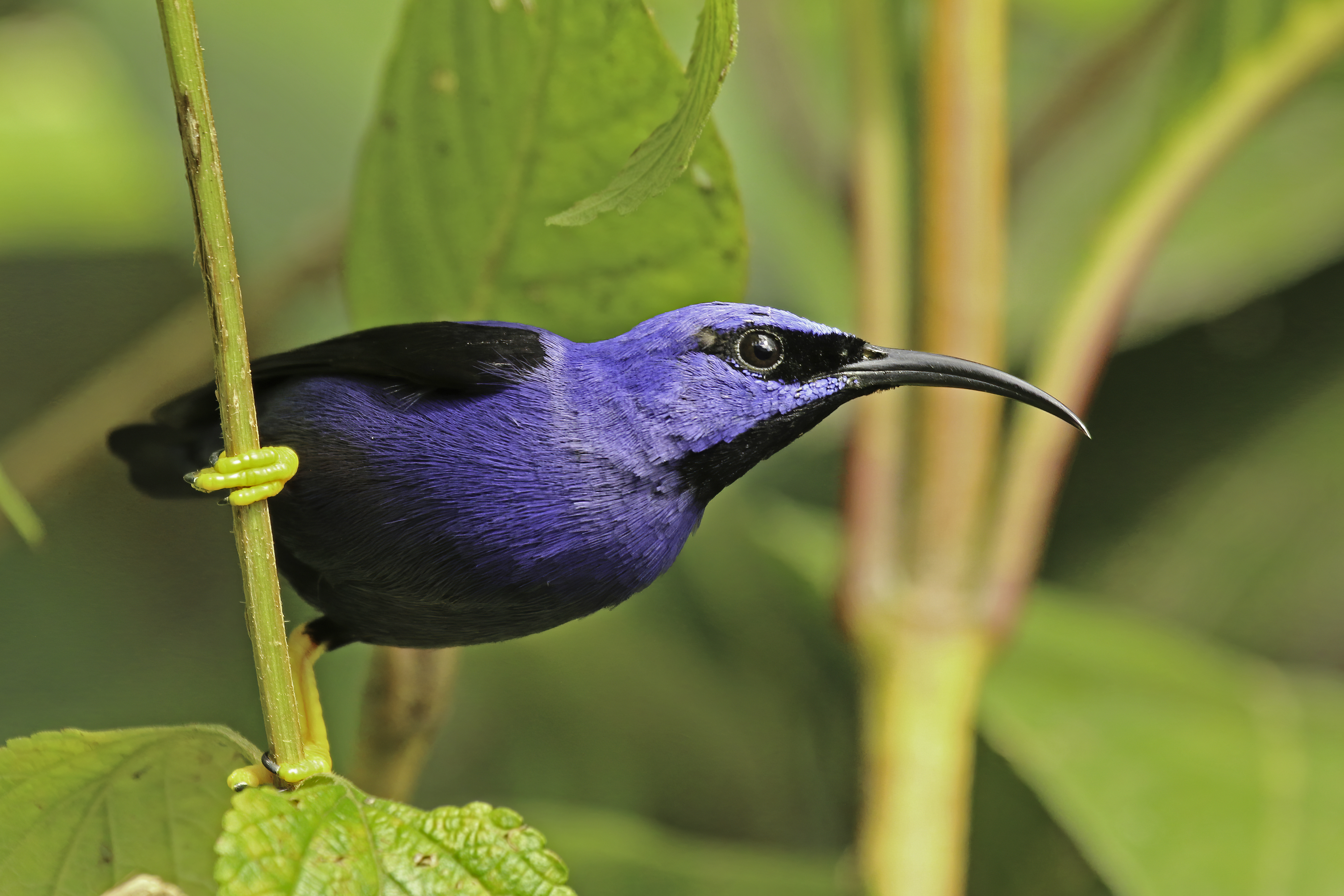
Purple honeycreeper, Trinidad

Order: Passeriformes Family: Thraupidae

The tanagers are a large group of small to medium-sized passerine birds restricted to the New World, mainly in the tropics. Many species are brightly colored. As a family they are omnivorous, but individual species specialize in eating fruits, seeds, insects, or other types of food. Most have short, rounded wings.

Common name	Binomial	Status
Green honeycreeper	Chlorophanes spiza spiza	Trinidad only
Bicolored conebill	Conirostrum bicolor	Trinidad only
Orange-fronted yellow-finch	Sicalis columbiana	Trinidad only - vagrant
Saffron finch	Sicalis flaveola	Trinidad only
Grassland yellow-finch	Sicalis luteola	Trinidad only
Blue-black grassquit	Volatinia jacarina	
White-shouldered tanager	Loriotus luctuosus	Trinidad only
White-lined tanager	Tachyphonus rufus	
Silver-beaked tanager	Ramphocelus carbo	Trinidad only
Purple honeycreeper	Cyanerpes caeruleus longirostris	Trinidad only
Red-legged honeycreeper	Cyanerpes cyaneus	
Swallow tanager	Tersina viridis	Common Trinidad, vagrant Tobago
Blue dacnis	Dacnis cayana	Trinidad only
Lesson's seedeater	Sporophila bouvronides	Trinidad only - status undetermined
Lined seedeater	Sporophila lineola	Trinidad only - vagrant
Ruddy-breasted seedeater	Sporophila minuta	Trinidad only
Chestnut-bellied seed-finch	Oryzoborus angolensis	Trinidad only - extirpated
Large-billed seed-finch (not on the BDSC list)	Oryzoborus crassirostris	Trinidad only - vagrant
Great-billed seed-finch	Sporophila maximiliani	vagrant
Gray seedeater	Sporophila intermedia	Trinidad only - extirpated
Wing-barred seedeater	Sporophila americana	Tobago only - extirpated
Yellow-bellied seedeater	Sporophila nigricollis	Trinidad only
Slate-colored seedeater	Sporophila schistacea	Trinidad only - extirpated
Olive-gray saltator	Saltator olivascens	Trinidad only
Streaked saltator	Saltator striatipectus	Trinidad only
Bananaquit	Coereba flaveola luteola	
Sooty grassquit	Asemospiza fuliginosa	Trinidad only
Black-faced grassquit	Melanospiza bicolor	Tobago only
Masked cardinal	Paroaria nigrogenis	Trinidad only
Blue-capped tanager	Sporathraupis cyanocephala	Trinidad only
Turquoise tanager	Tangara mexicana	Trinidad only
Bay-headed tanager	Tangara gyrola	Trinidad only
Blue-gray tanager	Thraupis episcopus berlepschi	
Palm tanager	Thraupis palmarum	
Speckled tanager	Ixothraupis guttata	Trinidad only
