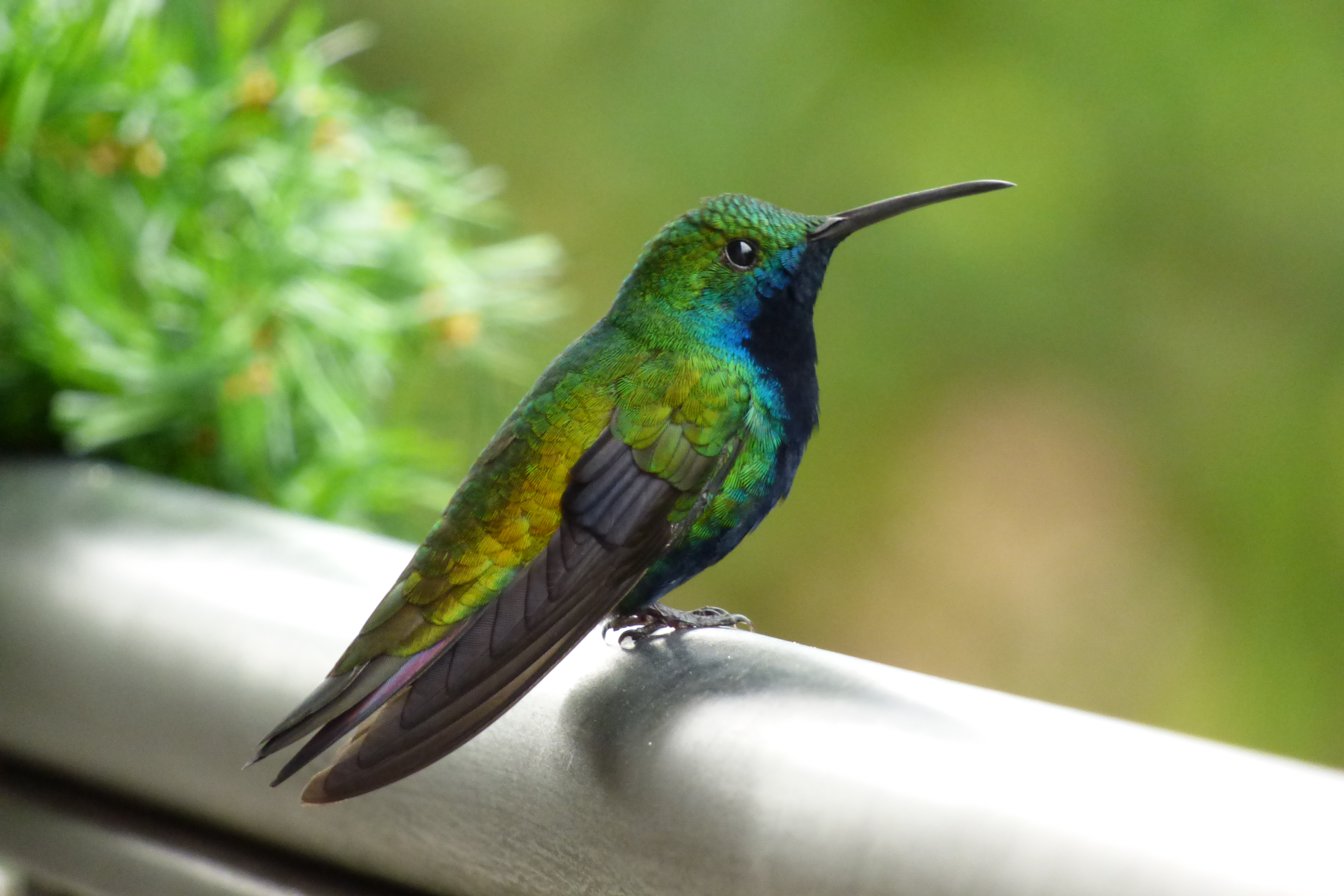
- Black-throated mango (Anthracothorax nigricollis)

Scientific classification
- Kingdom: Animalia
- Phylum: Chordata
- Class: Aves
- Order: Apodiformes
- Family: Trochilidae
- Subfamily: Polytminae; Reichenbach, 1849

Genera
- 12, see text

= Polytminae =

Subfamily of birds

Polytminae is one of the six subfamilies of the hummingbird family Trochilidae. The subfamily contains 12 genera with a total of 29 species.

The informal name "mangoes" has been proposed for this group as the seven species in the largest genus, Anthracothorax, include "mango" in their common name.

== Taxonomy ==
A molecular phylogenetic study of the hummingbirds published in 2007 found that the family consisted of nine clades. When Edward Dickinson and James Van Remsen, Jr. updated the Howard and Moore Complete Checklist of the Birds of the World for the 4th edition in 2013 they divided the nine clades into six subfamilies and proposed using the Latin name Polytminae for the "mango" clade, a name that had been introduced by Ludwig Reichenbach in 1849.

Pre-molecular studies did not anticipate the existence of this clade, but a common feature is the presence of serrations on the cutting edge of the bill. An extreme example is the tooth-billed hummingbird (Androdon aequatorialis).

Molecular phylogenetic studies by Jimmy McGuire and collaborators published between 2007 and 2014 determined the relationships between the major groups of hummingbirds. In the cladogram below, the English names are those introduced in 1997. The Latin names are those proposed by Dickinson and Remsen in 2013.

- Trochilidae
  - - Florisuginae – topazes
    - Phaethornithinae – hermits
  - - Polytminae – mangoes
    - - Lesbiinae
        - Heliantheini – brilliants
        - Lesbiini – coquettes
      - - Patagoninae – giant hummingbird
        - Trochilinae
          - - Lampornithini – mountain gems
            - Mellisugini – bees
          - Trochilini – emeralds

The phylogenetic relationships between the genera in the subfamily Polytminae, as determined in the 2014 study, are shown below. The genus Eulampis was found to be nested within Anthracothorax, making Anthracothorax paraphyletic. No species from the genus Augastes was sampled in the molecular studies, but based on a comparison of plumage features and bill shapes, it is believed that Augastes is closely related to Schistes.

- Polytminae
  - - Doryfera – lancebills
    - - Schistes – daggerbills
      - Colibri – violetears
  - - - Heliactin – horned sungem
      - - Androdon – tooth-billed hummingbird
        - Heliothryx – fairies
    - - Polytmus – goldenthroats
      - - Avocettula – fiery-tailed awlbill
        - - Chrysolampis – ruby-topaz hummingbird
          - Anthracothorax and Eulampis – mangoes and caribs

== Taxonomic list ==
The subfamily includes the following twelve genera:

Image	Genus	Living species
	Doryfera	Green-fronted lancebill, Doryfera ludovicae; Blue-fronted lancebill, Doryfera johannae
	Schistes	Geoffroy's daggerbill, Schistes geoffroyi; White-throated daggerbill, Schistes albogularis
	Augastes	Hyacinth visorbearer, Augastes scutatus; Hooded visorbearer, Augastes lumachella
	Colibri	Brown violetear, Colibri delphinae; Mexican violetear, Colibri thalassinus; Lesser violetear, Colibri cyanotus; Sparkling violetear, Colibri coruscans; White-vented violetear, Colibri serrirostris
	Androdon	Tooth-billed hummingbird, Androdon aequatorialis
	Heliactin	Horned sungem, Heliactin bilophus
	Heliothryx	Purple-crowned fairy, Heliothryx barroti; Black-eared fairy, Heliothryx auritus
	Polytmus	White-tailed goldenthroat, Polytmus guainumbi; Tepui goldenthroat, Polytmus milleri; Green-tailed goldenthroat, Polytmus theresiae
	Avocettula	Fiery-tailed awlbill, Avocettula recurvirostris
	Chrysolampis	Ruby-topaz hummingbird, Chrysolampis mosquitus
	Anthracothorax	Green-throated mango, Anthracothorax viridigula; Green-breasted mango, Anthracothorax prevostii; Black-throated mango, Anthracothorax nigricollis; Veraguan mango, Anthracothorax veraguensis; Hispaniolan mango, Anthracothorax dominicus; Puerto Rican mango, Anthracothorax aurulentus; Green mango, Anthracothorax viridis; Jamaican mango, Anthracothorax mango
	Eulampis	Purple-throated carib, Eulampis jugularis; Green-throated carib, Eulampis holosericeus

== Sources ==
- Dickinson, E.C.; Remsen, J.V. Jr., eds. (2013). The Howard & Moore Complete Checklist of the Birds of the World. Vol. 1: Non-passerines (4th ed.). Eastbourne, UK: Aves Press. ISBN 978-0-9568611-0-8.
