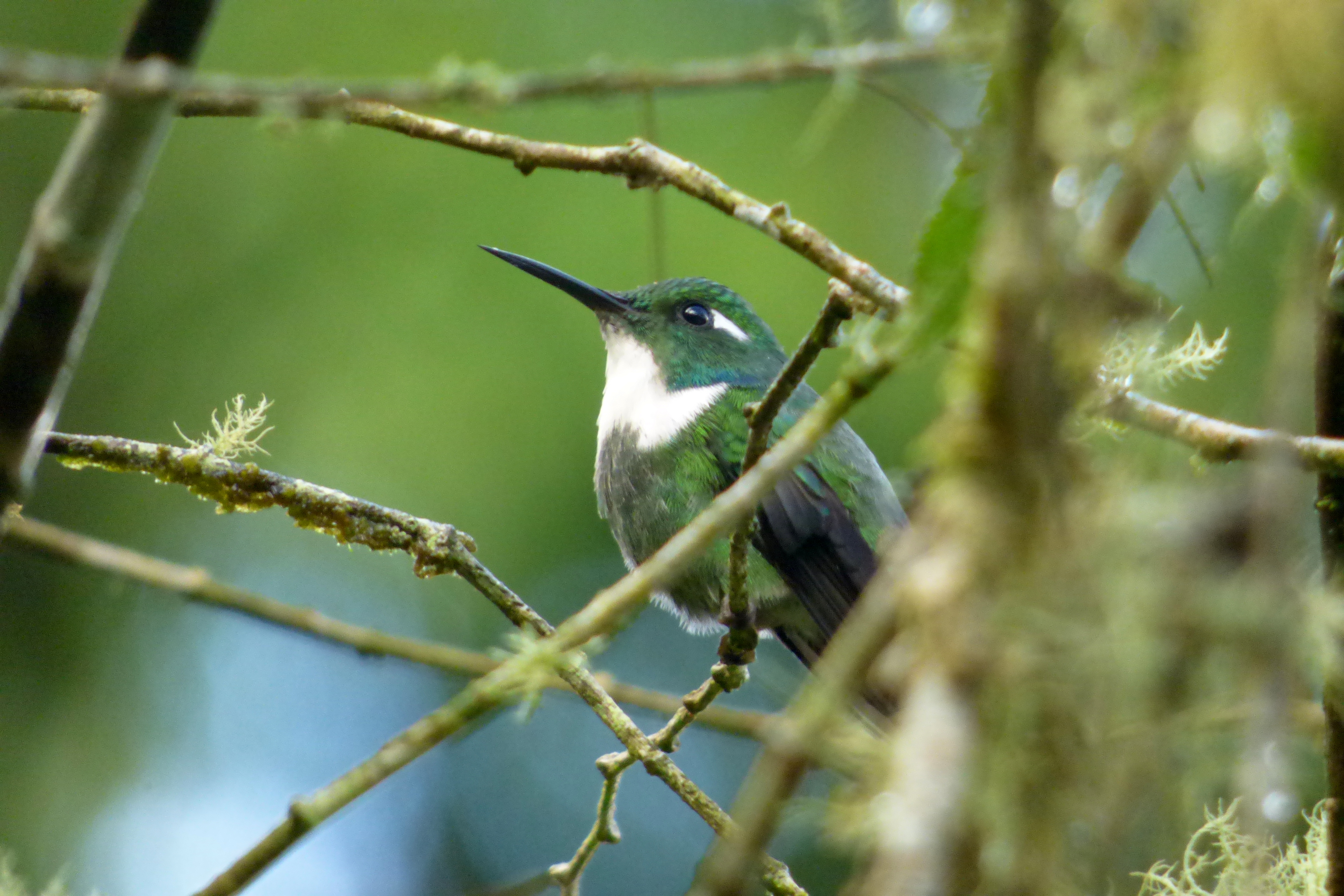
- White-throated daggerbill, (Schistes albogularis)

Scientific classification
- Kingdom: Animalia
- Phylum: Chordata
- Class: Aves
- Order: Apodiformes
- Family: Trochilidae
- Subfamily: Polytminae
- Genus: Schistes; Gould, 1852

Type species
- Trochilus geoffroyi Bourcier, 1843

Species
- 1 or 2

= Schistes =

Genus of birds

Schistes is a genus of hummingbirds in the family Trochilidae. It was long considered to have only one species, the wedge-billed hummingbird but this species was split. The genus now includes two species:

Genus Schistes – Gould, 1852 – two species
Common name	Scientific name and subspecies	Range	Size and ecology	IUCN status and estimated population
Geoffroy's daggerbill	Schistes geoffroyi (Bourcier, 1843)	Bolivia, Colombia, Ecuador, Peru, and Venezuela.	Size: Habitat: Diet:	LC
White-throated daggerbill	Schistes albogularis Gould, 1852	Colombia and Ecuador.	Size: Habitat: Diet:	LC
