= Wedge-billed hummingbird =

Wedge-billed hummingbird has been split into the following species:

- Geoffroy's daggerbill, Schistes geoffroyi
- White-throated daggerbill, Schistes albogularis
