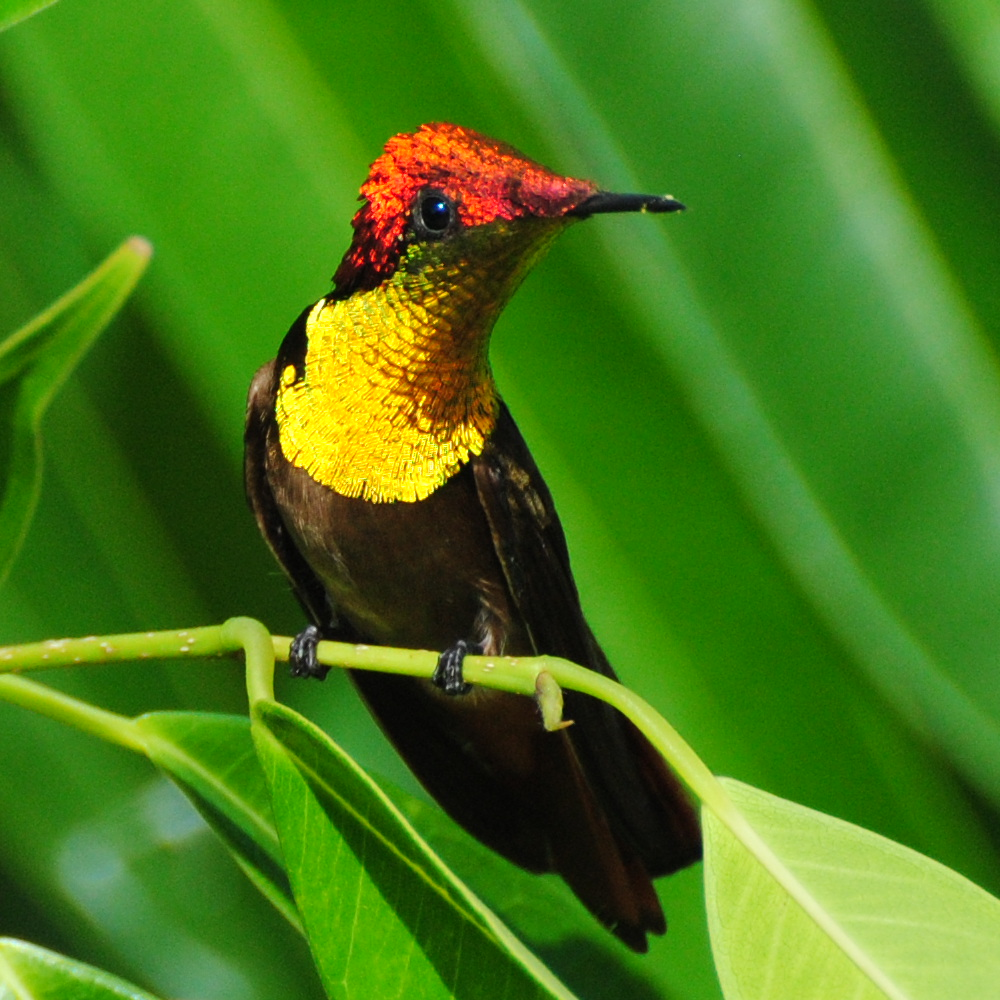
- In Bonaire

Conservation status
- Least Concern (IUCN 3.1)
- CITES Appendix II

Scientific classification
- Kingdom: Animalia
- Phylum: Chordata
- Class: Aves
- Order: Apodiformes
- Family: Trochilidae
- Subfamily: Polytminae
- Genus: Chrysolampis; Boie, F, 1831
- Species: C. mosquitus

Binomial name
- Chrysolampis mosquitus (Linnaeus, 1758)

Synonyms
- Trochilus mosquitus (protonym)

= Ruby-topaz hummingbird =

Species of bird

The ruby-topaz hummingbird (Chrysolampis mosquitus), commonly referred to simply as the ruby topaz, is a species of hummingbird in the subfamily Polytminae, the mangoes. It is found in Aruba, Bolivia, Bonaire, Brazil, Colombia, Curaçao, French Guiana, Guyana, Panama, Suriname, Trinidad and Tobago, and Venezuela.

== Taxonomy ==
The ruby-topaz hummingbird was formally described by the Swedish naturalist Carl Linnaeus in 1758 in the tenth edition of his Systema Naturae under the binomial name Trochilus mosquitus. The type locality is Suriname. The ruby-topaz hummingbird is now the only species placed in the genus Chrysolampis, which was introduced by the German zoologist Friedrich Boie in 1831. The name Chrysolampis is from the Ancient Greek khrusolampis meaning "glow-worm". The specific name mosquitus is a Spanish diminutive and means "little fly". The species is monotypic: no subspecies are recognised.

== Description ==
The ruby-topaz hummingbird is 8 to 9.5 cm (3.1 to 3.7 in) long and weighs 2.5 to 5 g (0.09 to 0.18 oz). Its almost straight, black bill is relatively short compared to those of most other hummingbirds. The male has dark brown upperparts with an olive gloss. Its crown and nape are glossy ruby red, and the throat and breast are usually iridescent golden though sometimes emerald green. The rest of the underparts are brown and the chestnut tail is tipped black.

The female ruby-topaz hummingbird has bronze-green upperparts and pale grey underparts. The tail is mostly chestnut with a dark subterminal band and a white tip; the central feathers are olive green. Females on Trinidad and Tobago sometimes have a greenish throat-streak (it may appear dark). Juvenile females are similar to adult females, but with a white-tipped dusky-brown tail. Juvenile males resemble the juvenile female, but with a variable amount of iridescent orange to the throat.

== Distribution and habitat ==
The ruby-topaz hummingbird is found from eastern Panama east through northern Colombia, Venezuela, and the Guianas into northeastern Brazil. From there it is found through central and eastern Brazil as far south as Mato Grosso and westward into eastern Bolivia. In Colombia its range extends southward between the three Andes ranges, and it is also found in the ABC Islands and Trinidad and Tobago. It has been recorded as a vagrant in Argentina and Peru and there is at least one unconfirmed sight record in Paraguay.

The ruby-topaz hummingbird inhabits the interior and edges of open savanna-like landscapes and shrubby arid hillsides; it is found in gardens and cultivated areas as well. It mostly occurs below 500 m (1,600 ft) of elevation but is found as high as 1,700 m (5,600 ft).

== Behavior ==
=== Movement ===
The ruby-topaz hummingbird is migratory, though its movement pattern and timing vary across its range and are not well defined. It appears to move north and south in Brazil and east and west along the north coast of South America and the offshore islands.

=== Feeding ===
The ruby-topaz hummingbird feeds on nectar from a wide variety of flowering shrubs, trees, epiphytes, cacti, and crops. However, they prefer the flowers of the samaan tree and the Ixora plant since these flowers have a high sugar content. Males defend feeding territories. The species also catches small insects and spiders on the wing and sometimes gleans them from within foliage.

=== Breeding ===
The ruby-topaz hummingbird's breeding season varies across its range. In the northern part it spans from December to June and in much of Brazil from September to March. The female makes a tiny cup nest of fine plant fibers and spider silk decorated on the outside with lichens. It places it on a branch or in a branch fork, typically between 1 and 4 metres (3.3 and 13 ft) above the ground. The clutch size is two eggs. The incubation time is 15 to 16 days with fledging usually 19 to 22 days after hatch, though sometimes as long as 28 days.

=== Vocalization ===
The ruby-topaz hummingbird's song is "a doubled 'tliii...tliii...tliii'", which is usually given from a high perch.

== Status ==
The IUCN has assessed the ruby-topaz hummingbird as being of Least Concern, though its population size and trend are unknown. It is a "[c]ommon resident in the lowlands and coastal ranges" and "[r]eadily accepts man-made habitats".

== Gallery ==
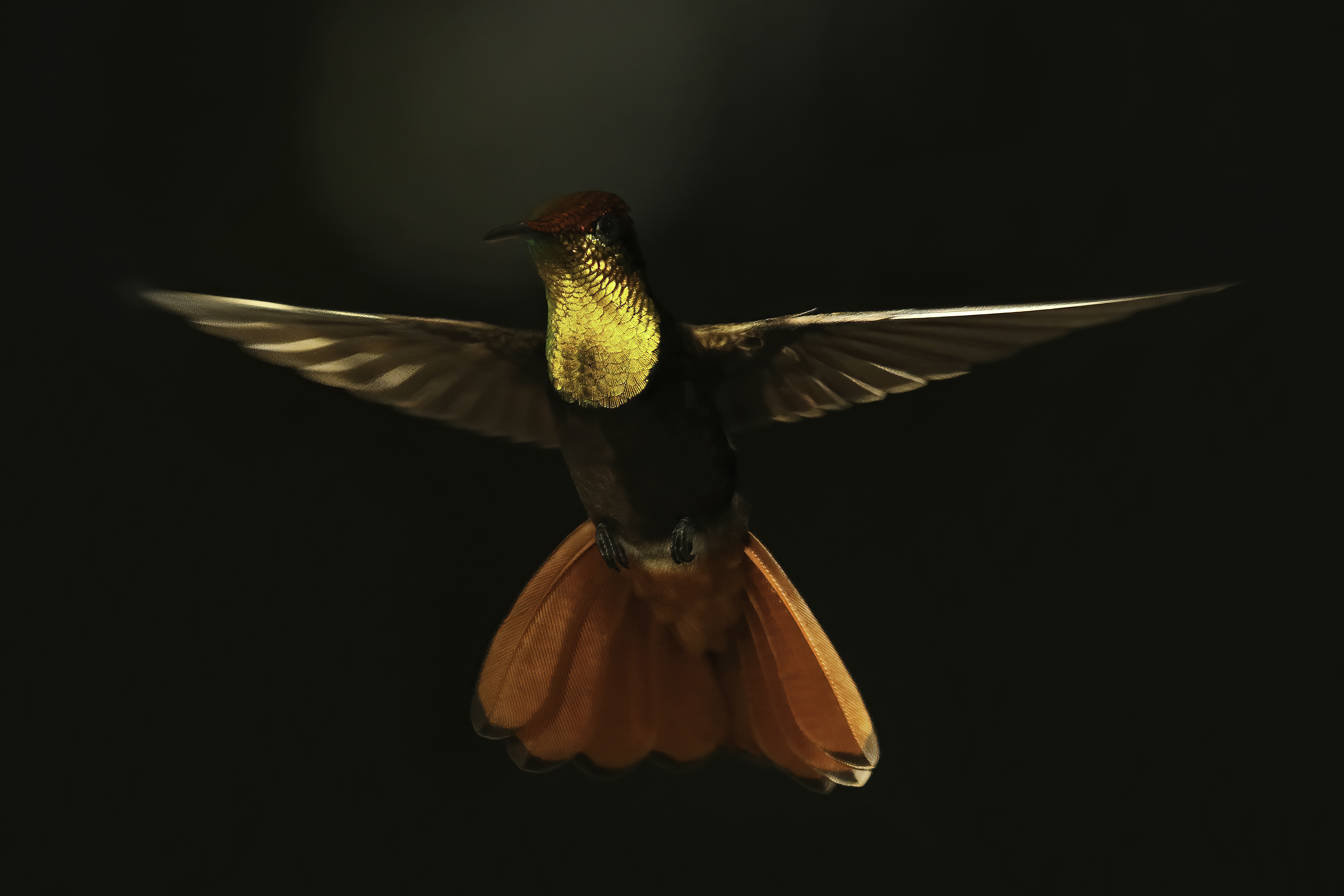
Male in flight

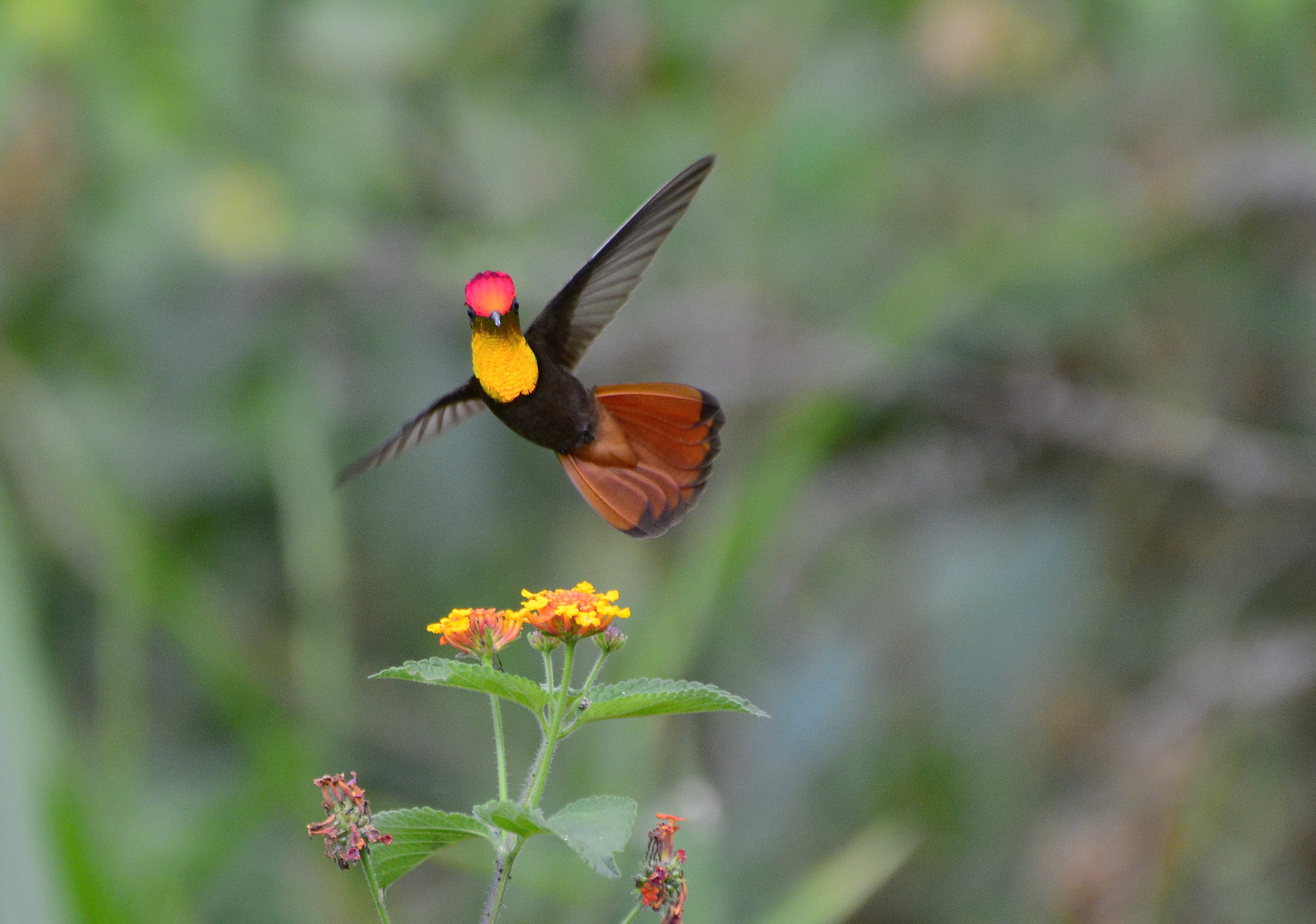
Male in flight

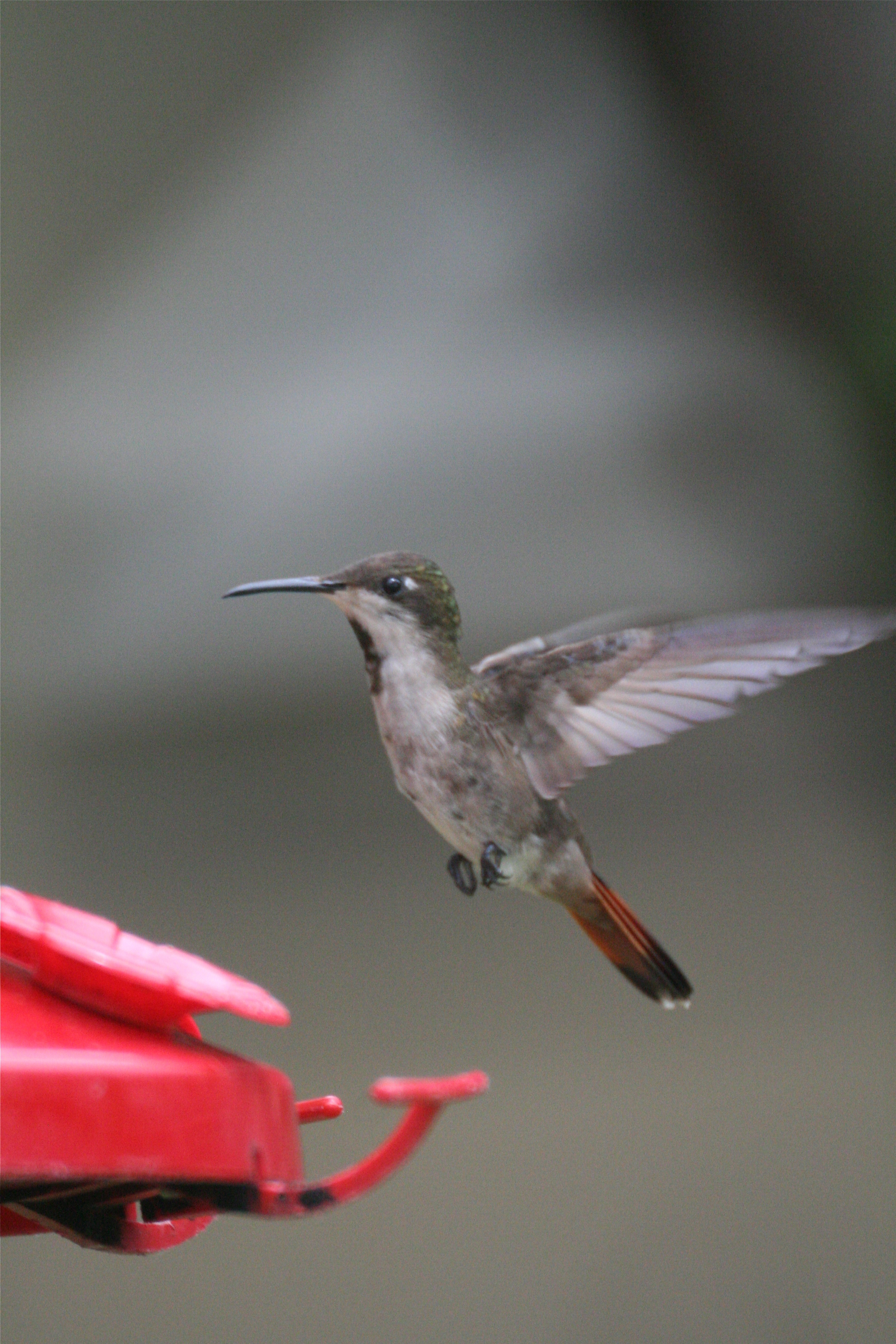
Female in flight

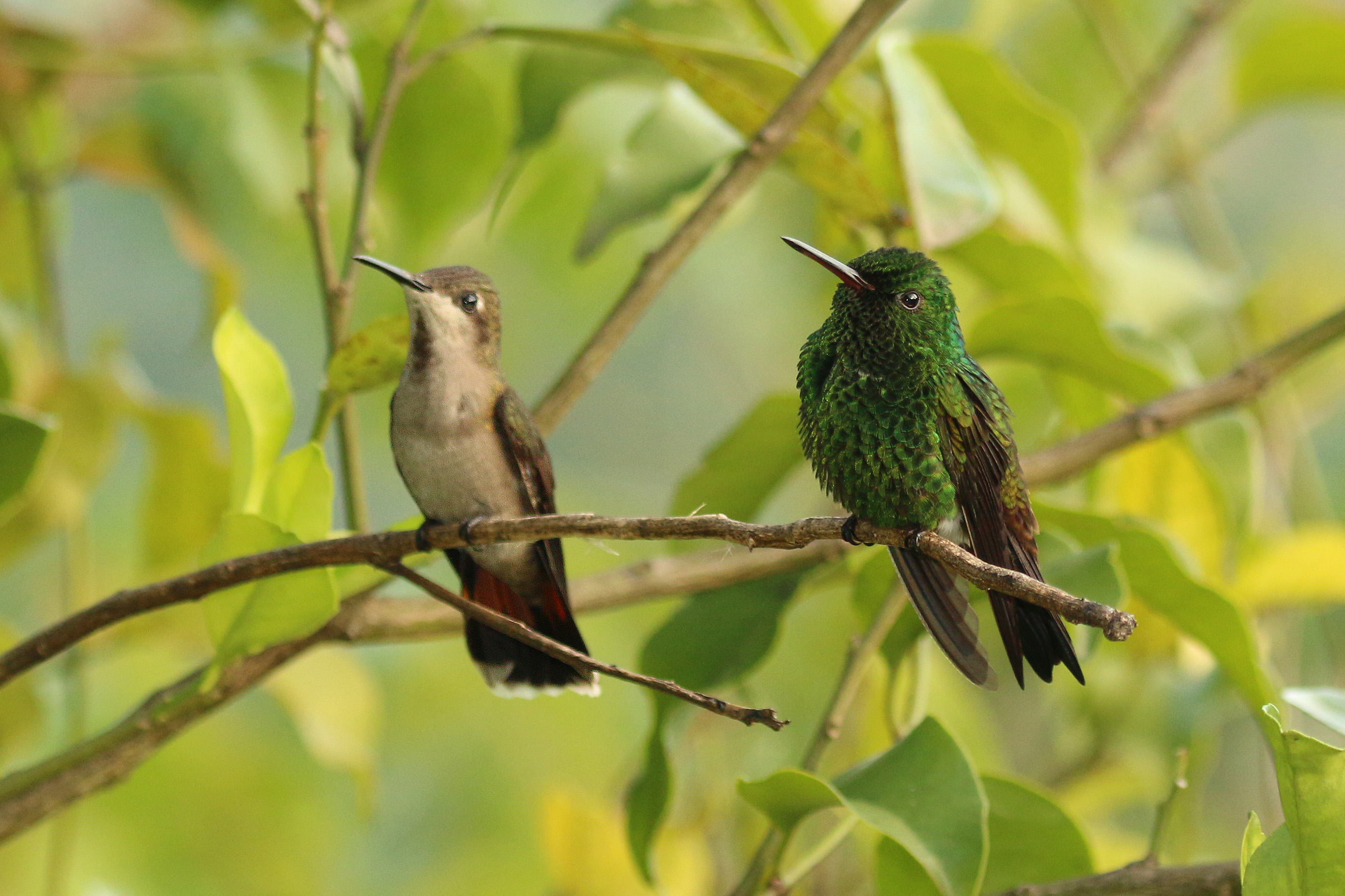
Female (left)

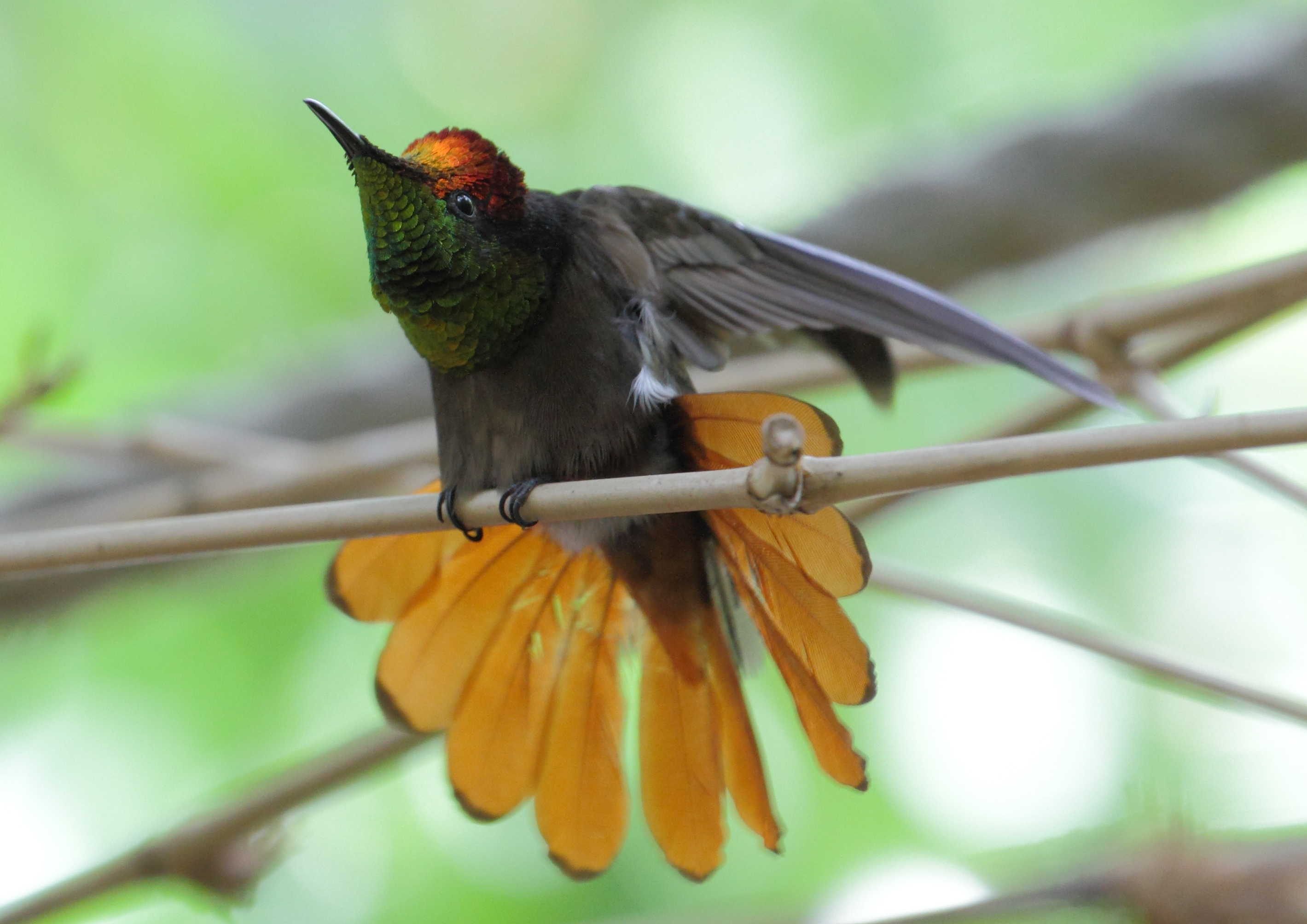
Male

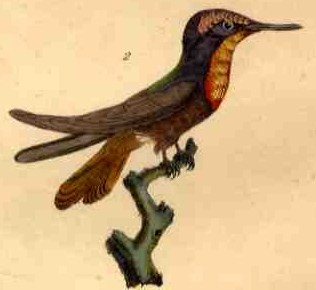
Male by Georges-Louis Leclerc de Buffon (1707–1788)
