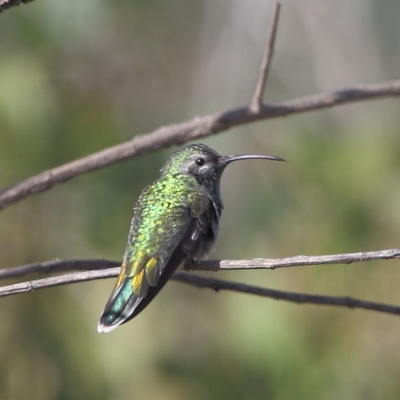
- White-tailed goldenthroat at Dourado, São Paulo state, Brazil

Conservation status
- Least Concern (IUCN 3.1)
- CITES Appendix II (CITES)

Scientific classification
- Kingdom: Animalia
- Phylum: Chordata
- Class: Aves
- Clade: Strisores
- Order: Apodiformes
- Family: Trochilidae
- Genus: Polytmus
- Species: P. guainumbi

Binomial name
- Polytmus guainumbi (Pallas, 1764)

Synonyms
- Polytmus thaumantias

= White-tailed goldenthroat =

Species of hummingbird

The white-tailed goldenthroat (Polytmus guainumbi) is a species of hummingbird in the subfamily Polytminae, the mangoes. It is found in Argentina, Bolivia, Brazil, Colombia, French Guiana, Guyana, Paraguay, Peru, Suriname, Trinidad and Tobago, and Venezuela.

== Taxonomy and systematics ==
The white-tailed goldenthroat was at one time named Polytmus thaumantias. It has three subspecies, the nominate P. g. guainumbi, P. g. andinus, and P. g. thaumantias.

== Description ==
The white-tailed goldenthroat is 9.7 to 11.8 cm (3.8 to 4.6 in) long and weighs 4.4 to 5 g (0.16 to 0.18 oz). All subspecies have a long decurved reddish and black bill. The male of the nominate subspecies has shiny golden to bronzy green upperparts. Its tail is long and rounded; the feathers are mostly green with white tips and the outer three pairs have broad white edges. The area around the eye is dusky gray with white streaks above and below it. The underparts are iridescent golden-green. The female has buffy streaks on the face, a whitish chin, and buff underparts with green spots on the throat and breast. P. g. andinus is like the nominate but with more white on the inner tail feathers. P. g. thaumantias has a somewhat shorter bill than the nominate, its upperparts are reddish gold, and it has less white on the outer tail feathers.

== Distribution and habitat ==
The nominate subspecies of white-tailed goldenthroat is found in Trinidad and from Venezuela through the Guianas into coastal northern Brazil's Amapá state. P. g. andinus is found in eastern Colombia as far south as Meta and Vichada departments.P. g. thaumantias is found from extreme southeastern Peru across Bolivia and Brazil to the Atlantic Ocean and south into eastern Paraguay and northeastern Argentina. In eastern Brazil it occurs from Maranhão south as far as northern Paraná. The species inhabits a variety of landscapes including wet grassland, shrubby savanna, cerrado, and freshwater swamps, and in dryer areas tends to be near any water. In elevation it ranges from sea level to 600 m (2,000 ft).

== Behavior ==
=== Movement ===
The white-tailed goldenthroat is mostly sedentary. Some seasonal movements after the nesting season have been noted on Trinidad, and it appears to be only a winter visitor to Brazil's Mato Grosso do Sul state and northeastern Argentina.

=== Feeding ===
The white-tailed goldenthroat feeds on nectar from flowering garden plants, shrubs, and trees. It forages singly and low to the ground. It also catches insects on the wing and gleans them and spiders from vegetation.

=== Breeding ===
The white-tailed goldenthroat's breeding seasons vary throughout its range. The female alone builds the nest, incubates the eggs, and cares for the young. It makes a small cup nest of plant down decorated with lichen, placed in the fork of a shrub usually between 0.5 and 1 m (1.6 and 3.3 ft) above the ground. The clutch size is two eggs. The incubation time is 14 to 15 days with fledging 20 to 22 days after hatch.

=== Vocalization ===
The white-tailed goldenthroat is vocal when foraging, giving a "fast-paced series of loud, excited 'spit' notes". It also gives a "dry 'tsip-tsip' in flight."

== Status ==
The IUCN has assessed the white-tailed goldenthroat as being of Least Concern, though its population size and trend are unknown. It is considered common to locally abundant in most of its range, though uncommon and local on Trinidad and rare in French Guiana. Its habitats "in many parts of [its] range are not seriously threatened."
