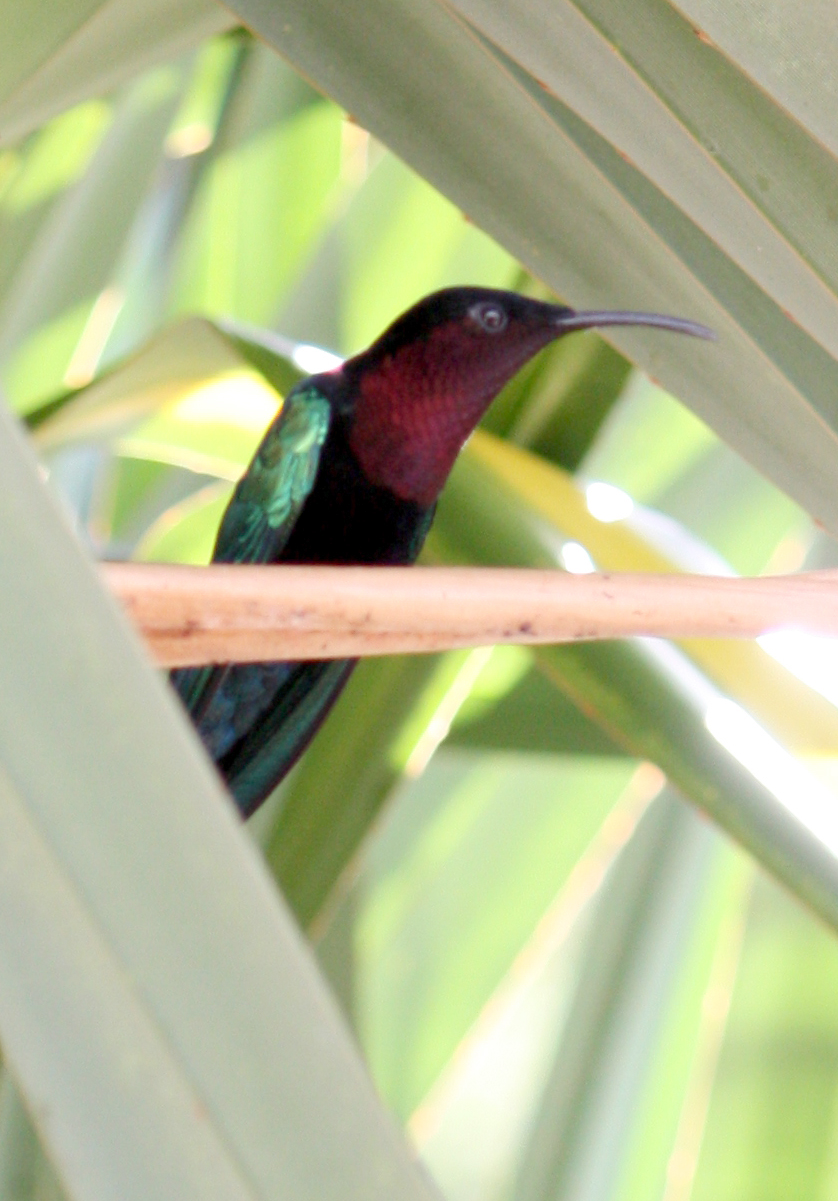
- Purple-throated carib (Eulampis jugularis) in Dominica

Scientific classification
- Kingdom: Animalia
- Phylum: Chordata
- Class: Aves
- Order: Apodiformes
- Family: Trochilidae
- Subfamily: Polytminae
- Genus: Eulampis; F. Boie, 1831

Type species
- Trochilus auratus = Trochilus jugularis Linnaeus, 1766

Species
- 2, see text

= Eulampis =

Caribs

Genus of birds

The caribs are a genus, Eulampis, of hummingbirds in the family Trochilidae. The genus contains two species, both of which are endemic to the islands of the Caribbean. The genus name comes from the Ancient Greek word eulampēs meaning 'bright shining'.

Unlike most of the related species of Trochilinae hummingbirds, the caribs lack strong sexual dimorphism, meaning the males and females are the very similar in appearance. The only difference between the sexes is that the bill of the female in both species is longer and more decurved.

== Taxonomy ==
The genus Eulampis was introduced in 1831 by the German zoologist Friedrich Boie. The type species was subsequently designated as the purple-throated carib. The genus name is from the Ancient Greek eulampēs meaning "bright" or "shining". A molecular phylogenetic study published in 2014 found that Eulambis was embedded in the genus Anthracothorax.

== Species list ==
The genus contains two species:

Genus Eulampis – Linnaeus, 1766 – two species
Common name	Scientific name and subspecies	Range	Size and ecology	IUCN status and estimated population
Green-throated carib	Eulampis holosericeus (Linnaeus, 1758) Two subspecies: E. h. holosericeus (Linnaeus, 1758); E. h. chlorolaemus (Gould, 1857)	Lesser Antilles to Puerto Rico.	Size: Habitat: Diet:	LC
Purple-throated carib	Eulampis jugularis (Linnaeus, 1766)	Lesser Antilles.	Size: Habitat: Diet:	LC
