= Emílio Joaquim da Silva Maia =

Brazilian naturalist and ornithologist (1808–1859)

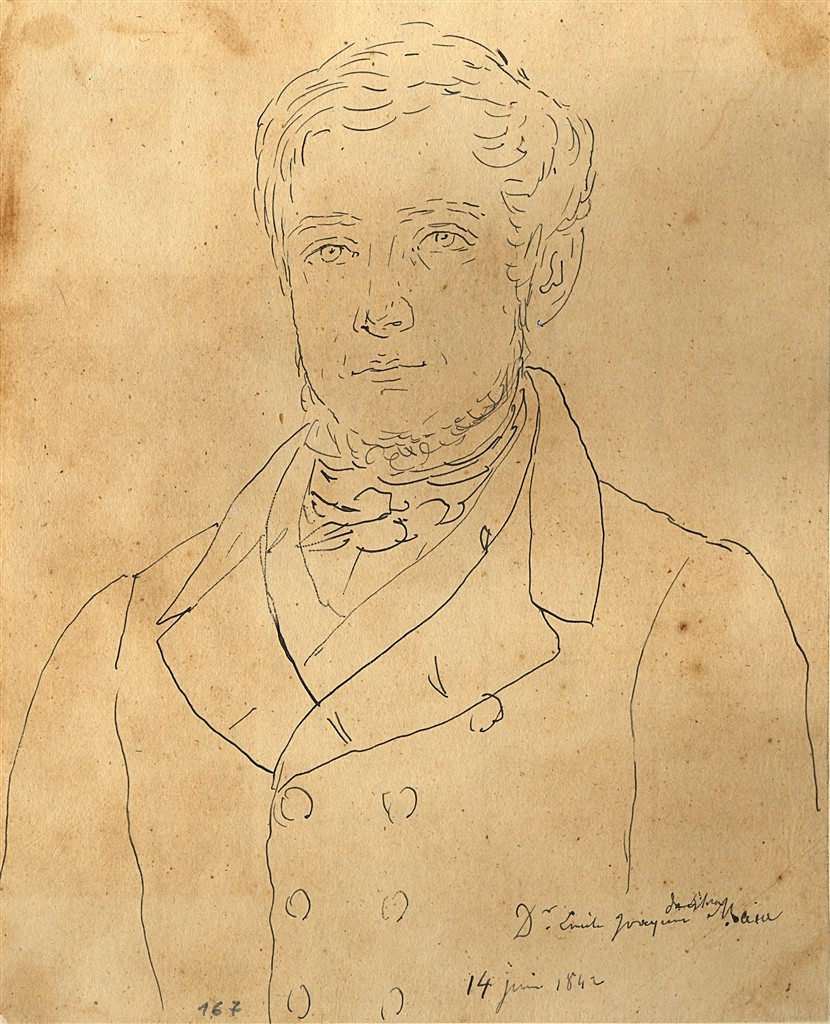
A portrait sketch, 1842

Emílio Joaquim da Silva Maia (8 September 1808 – 21 November 1859) was a Brazilian medical doctor and naturalist who founded the Vellosiana Society which ran the first journal in the region that carried notes on natural history, O Guanabara. He was also one of the founders of the Brazilian Historic and Geographic Institute.

== Biography ==
Silva Maia was born in Salvador, son of Joaquim José da Silva Maia a Portuguese trader and Knight of the Order of Christ. The Brazilian struggle for independence led the family to move to Porto and Silva Maia received a bachelor's degree from the University of Coimbra in January 1824. Even before the Liberal Wars he fought alongside the constitutionalists against the absolutists and he was forced to flee when the constitution was revoked and returned to Brazil in 1829. He soon returned to Europe to the University of Paris to study medicine and received a degree in 1833 with a dissertation titled Essai sur les dangers de l'allaitement par les nourrices. In 1834 he became a member of the Academy of Medicine in Rio de Janeiro and was a full professor in the Colégio Pedro II. He became director of comparative anatomy and zoology at the National Museum in 1842. He also edited the Minerva Brasiliense periodical. He helped reorganize the museum. He played a major role in fighting deforestation in Rio de Janeiro and saw the value of mangroves. He corresponded with Geoffroy and Isidore Saint-Hilaire on matters of natural history. The hummingbird species Polytmus theresiae was described and named by Silva Maria in an article in the Minerva Brasiliense. He named the species after the Empress of Brazil. He also edited a journal called O Guanabara from 1849 to 1850 which was an eclectic mix of literary pieces and scientific essays. The journal ran into trouble after a yellow fever outbreak. Influenced by Georges Cuvier, under whom he had studied, he sought to explain biogeographic patterns based on initial Creation followed by dispersal of organisms within limits set by the habitats of species. He also accepted the view that cataclysmic events had caused many species to go extinct. He accepted Humboldt's idea that there were more species in the tropics. He also recognized the endemism of groups such as hummingbirds and tried to explain it in terms of species creation in multiple geographic centres, recognizing 14 of them based on the work of De Candolle and Karl Willdenow. Silva Maria did not read many English language works and died a few days before the publication of Darwin's On the Origin of Species.

Silva Maia died just in 1859 and was buried at São Francisco de Paula cemetery.
