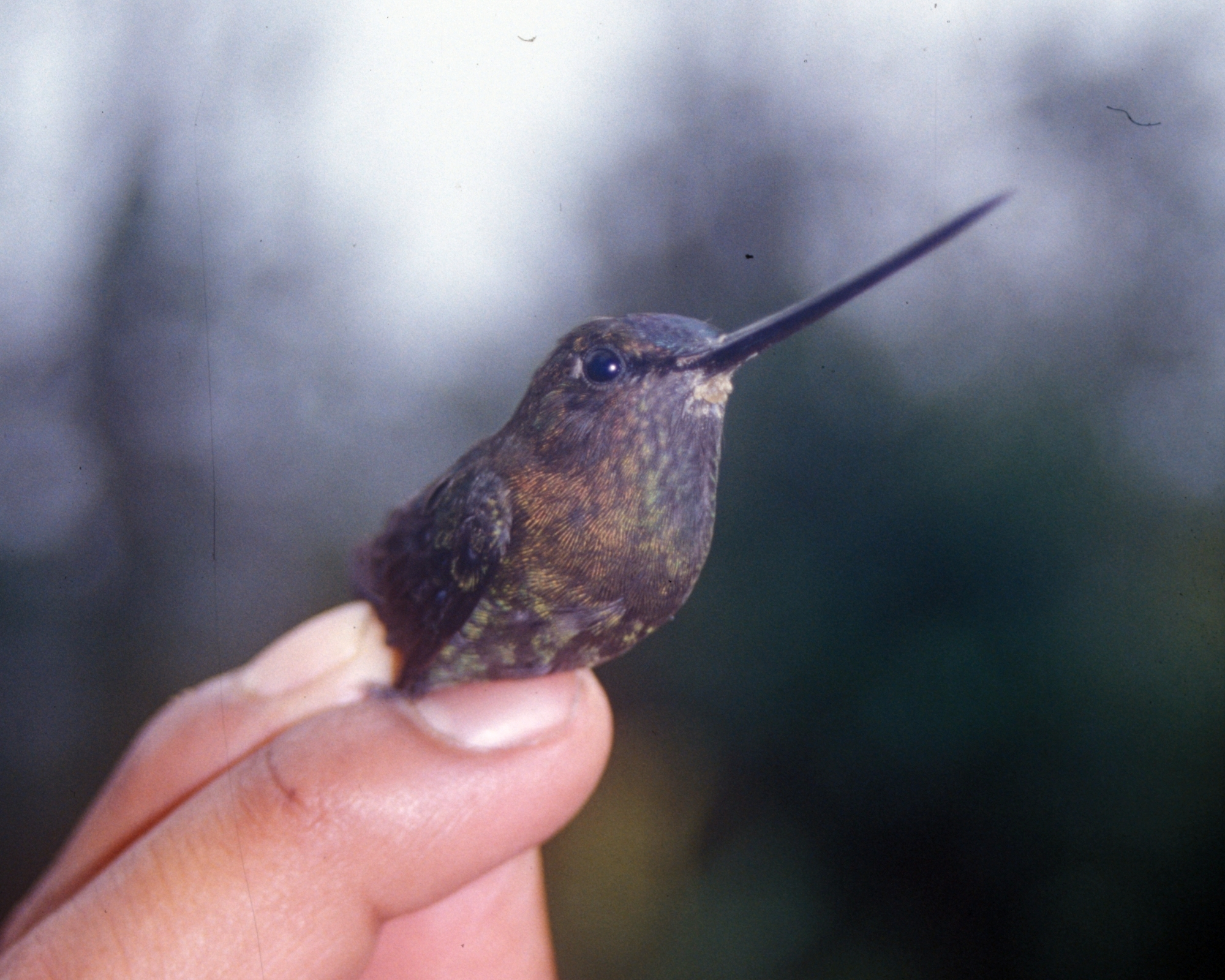
- Green-fronted lancebill (D. ludovicae)

Scientific classification
- Kingdom: Animalia
- Phylum: Chordata
- Class: Aves
- Order: Apodiformes
- Family: Trochilidae
- Subfamily: Polytminae
- Genus: Doryfera; Gould, 1847

Species
- 2, see text

= Doryfera =

Genus of birds

Doryfera is a genus of hummingbird in the family Trochilidae.

== Species ==
The genus contains the following species:

Genus Doryfera – Gould, 1847 – two species
Common name	Scientific name and subspecies	Range	Size and ecology	IUCN status and estimated population
Blue-fronted lancebill	Doryfera johannae (Bourcier, 1847) Two subspecies: D. j. johannae; D. j. guianensis	Brazil, Colombia, Ecuador, Guyana, Peru, and Venezuela.	Size: Habitat: Diet:	LC
Green-fronted lancebill	Doryfera ludovicae (Bourcier & Mulsant, 1847)	Bolivia, Colombia, Costa Rica, Ecuador, Panama, Peru, and Venezuela.	Size: Habitat: Diet:	LC
