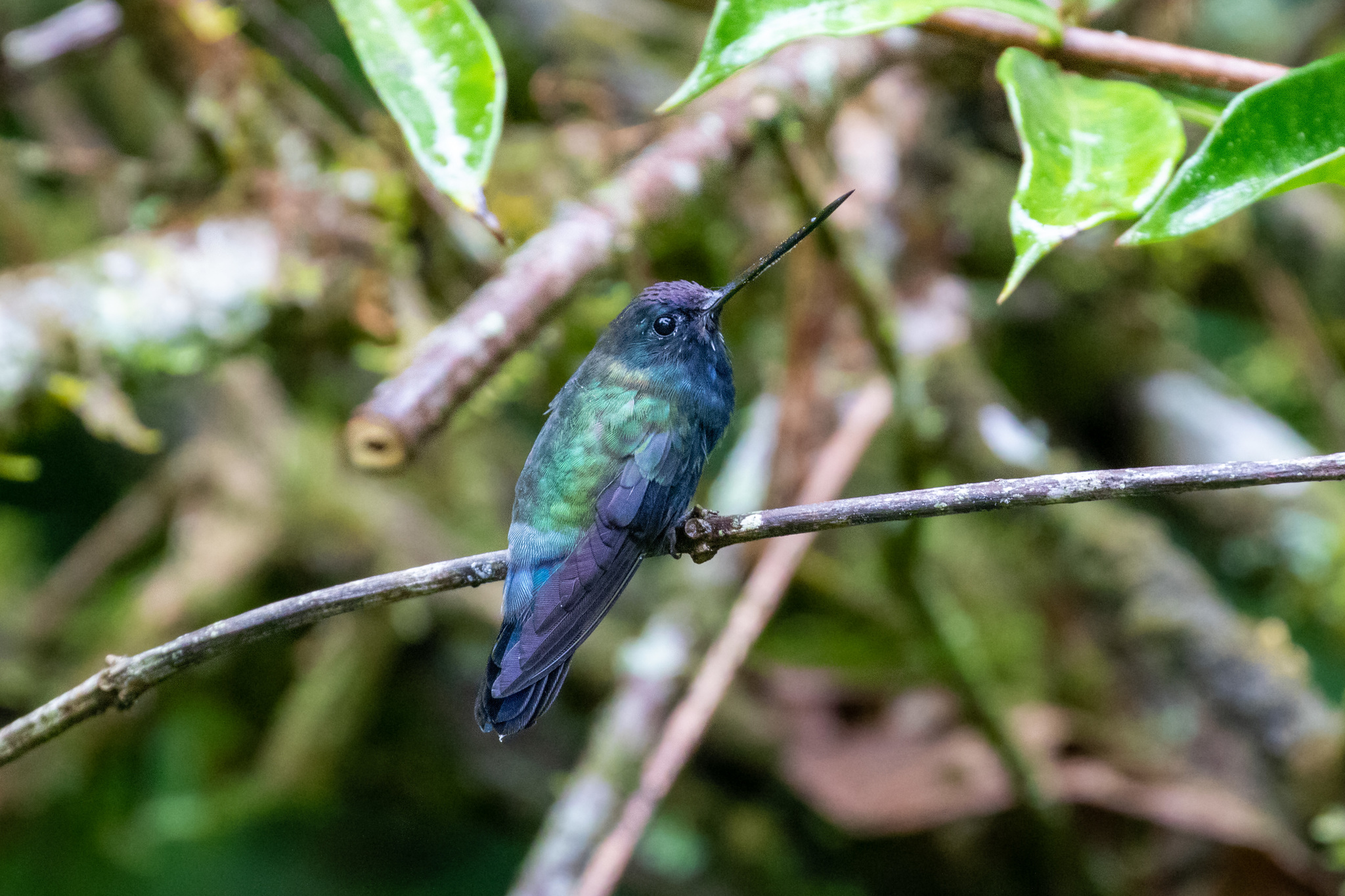

Conservation status
- Least Concern (IUCN 3.1)
- CITES Appendix II

Scientific classification
- Kingdom: Animalia
- Phylum: Chordata
- Class: Aves
- Order: Apodiformes
- Family: Trochilidae
- Genus: Doryfera
- Species: D. johannae

Binomial name
- Doryfera johannae (Bourcier, 1847)
- Range of Doryfera johannae

Audio

= Blue-fronted lancebill =

Species of hummingbird

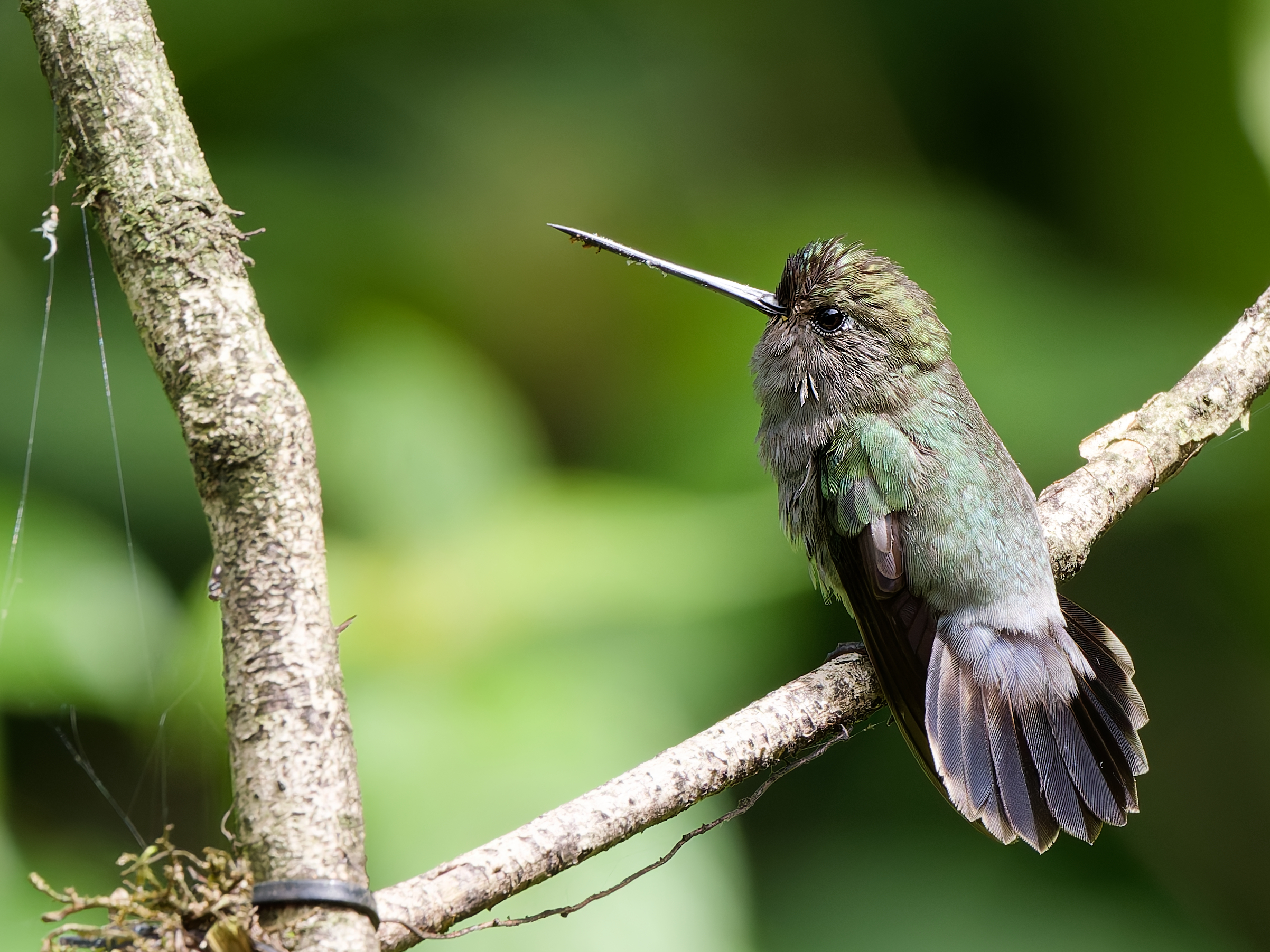
Blue-fronted Lancebill in Peru

The blue-fronted lancebill (Doryfera johannae) is a species of hummingbird in the family Trochilidae. It is found in Brazil, Colombia, Ecuador, Guyana, Peru, and Venezuela.

== Taxonomy and systematics ==
The blue-fronted lancebill has two subspecies, the nominate D. j. johannae and D. j. guianensis. It shares its genus only with the very similar green-fronted lancebill (D. ludovicae).

== Description ==
The blue-fronted lancebill is 9.6 to 11 cm (3.8 to 4.3 in) long. Males weigh 3 to 5 g (0.11 to 0.18 oz) and females 3.3 to 6 g (0.12 to 0.21 oz). Both sexes have a long straight to slightly upcurved bill, and often hold it at an upward angle. Males of the nominate subspecies have a violet forehead ("front"), a bronze nape, and otherwise dark bronzy green upperparts. The tail is short and blue-black. The underparts are blue-black with a bluish green gloss on the throat and breast. The female differs from the male by having a greenish blue forehead and dull grayish bronzy green underparts. Both sexes of D. j. guianensis have a shorter bill than the nominate and are overall paler but similarly colored.

== Distribution and habitat ==
The nominate subspecies of blue-fronted lancebill is found on the east slope of the Andes from east central Colombia south through eastern Ecuador to central and southeastern Peru. It inhabits wet forests of lower Andean slopes and foothills and the adjacent lowlands. It favors ravines, gorges, and rock outcroppings and usually occurs from the forest's middle strata into the lower canopy. However, it occurs down to the shrub level at forest edges. In elevation it mostly ranges between 800 and 1,200 m (2,620 and 3,940 ft). D. j. guianensis is found disjunctly in southeastern Venezuela, western Guyana, and slightly into adjoining northern Brazil. It inhabits tropical and subtropical forests on the area's tepuis, mostly at elevations between 900 and 2,000 m (2,950 and 6,560 ft), and does not occur in the lowlands between them.

== Behavior ==
=== Movement ===
The blue-fronted lancebill is assumed to be mostly sedentary but might make some seasonal elevational movements.

=== Feeding ===
The blue-fronted lancebill's diet is nectar and small arthropods. It draws the former from tubular flowers, typically those that droop or are horizontal. It does not usually defend feeding territories. It catches arthropods on the wing or by hover-gleaning from vegetation.

=== Breeding ===
The blue-fronted lancebill's breeding season varies in different parts of its range but has not been thoroughly studied. Only one nest has been described in detail. It was a cylinder made of moss and spider silk with a cup at the top and was suspended from a rock overhang in a shallow cave.

=== Vocalization ===
The blue-fronted lancebill's song has not been described and apparently has not been recorded. While foraging it makes "thin, dry, chittering notes...e.g. 'chuert'."

== Status ==
The IUCN has assessed the blue-fronted lancebill as being of Least Concern, though its population size is unknown and believed to be decreasing. Much of the range of the nominate subspecies has been deforested but that of D. j. guianensis is largely intact. It is "uncommon to fairly common in good forest habitat"' and it appears to somewhat tolerate local disturbance such as selective logging.
