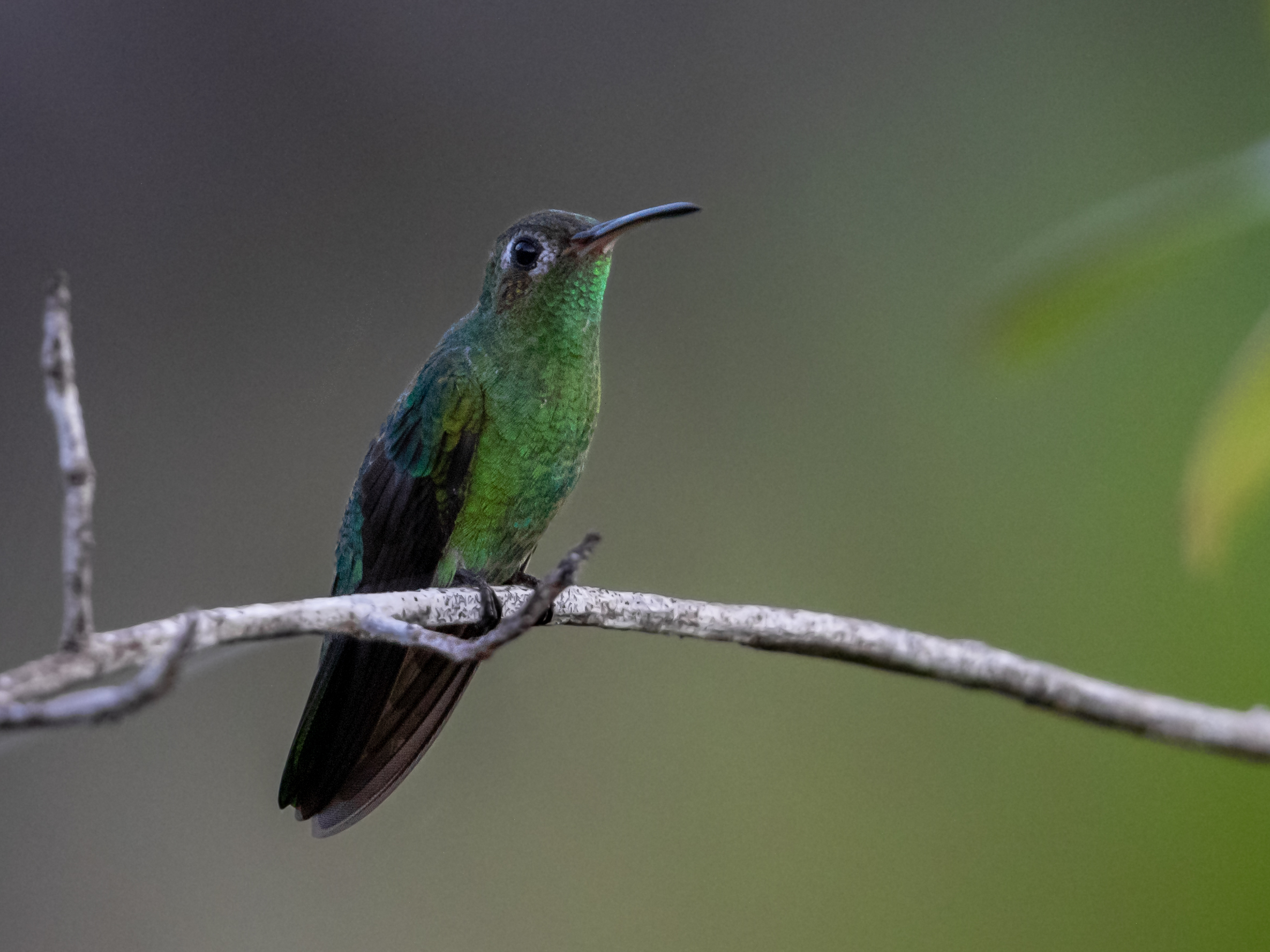
- Green-tailed goldenthroat, Polytmus theresiae

Scientific classification
- Domain: Eukaryota
- Kingdom: Animalia
- Phylum: Chordata
- Class: Aves
- Clade: Strisores
- Order: Apodiformes
- Family: Trochilidae
- Subfamily: Polytminae
- Genus: Polytmus; Brisson, 1760

Type species
- Trochilus thaumantias Linnaeus, 1766

= Goldenthroat =

Genus of birds

The goldenthroats are a small group of hummingbirds in the genus Polytmus.

The genus Polytmus was introduced by the French zoologist Mathurin Jacques Brisson in 1760 with the type species as Polytmus guainumbi thaumantias, a subspecies of the white-tailed goldenthroat. The name of the genus is from the Ancient Greek πολυτιμος polutimos "very costly", "valuable".

The genus contains three species:

Genus Polytmus – Brisson, 1760 – three species
Common name	Scientific name and subspecies	Range	Size and ecology	IUCN status and estimated population
White-tailed goldenthroat	Polytmus guainumbi (Pallas, 1764) Three subspecies: 'P. g. guainumbi; P. g. andinus; P. g. thaumantias	Argentina, Bolivia, Brazil, Colombia, French Guiana, Guyana, Paraguay, Peru, Suriname, Trinidad and Tobago, and Venezuela	Size: Habitat: Diet:	LC
Tepui goldenthroat	Polytmus milleri (Chapman, 1929)	Brazil, Guyana, and Venezuela	Size: Habitat: Diet:	LC
Green-tailed goldenthroat	Polytmus theresiae (Da Silva Maia, 1843) Two subspecies: P. t. theresiae; P. t. leucorrhous	Brazil, Colombia, French Guiana, Guyana, Peru, Suriname, and Venezuela, and possibly Ecuador	Size: Habitat: Diet:	LC
