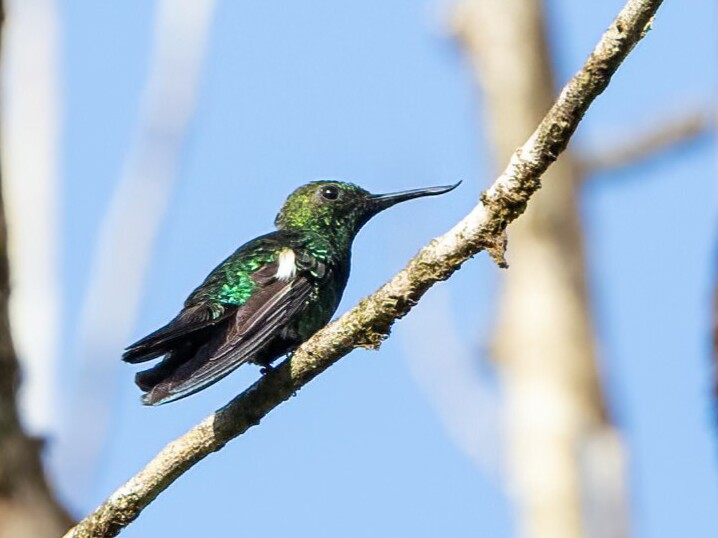

Conservation status
- Least Concern (IUCN 3.1)
- CITES Appendix II

Scientific classification
- Kingdom: Animalia
- Phylum: Chordata
- Class: Aves
- Clade: Strisores
- Order: Apodiformes
- Family: Trochilidae
- Subfamily: Polytminae
- Genus: Avocettula; Reichenbach, 1849
- Species: A. recurvirostris

Binomial name
- Avocettula recurvirostris (Swainson, 1822)

= Fiery-tailed awlbill =

Species of hummingbird

The fiery-tailed awlbill (Avocettula recurvirostris) is a species of hummingbird in the subfamily Polytminae, the mangoes. It is found in Brazil, Ecuador, French Guiana, Guyana, Suriname, and Venezuela.

== Taxonomy and systematics ==
The fiery-tailed awlbill is the only member of genus Avocettula and has no subspecies. The genus had earlier been merged into Anthracothorax.

== Description ==
The fiery-tailed awlbill is 8 to 10 cm (3.1 to 3.9 in) long and weighs about 4.3 g (0.15 oz). Its unique bill is short with a dramatically upturned tip. The adult male has green upperparts. Its throat is shiny emerald green and the belly shiny emerald green with a black center. The top of the tail is violet but for all-green central feathers. The adult female also has green upperparts. Its underparts are white with a black stripe down the middle. Its tail is bluish black and the outer feathers have white tips. Juveniles are similar to the adult female but the underside of the tail is coppery red.

== Distribution and habitat ==
The fiery-tailed awlbill is found in Amazonia, from southeastern Venezuela east through the Guianas into northern Brazil and south into Brazil as far west as Acre and as far east as Maranhão and Tocantins. There is also a disjunct population along the Napo River in eastern Ecuador. The species has been recorded as a vagrant in Colombia.

The fiery-tailed awlbill primarily inhabits open savanna-like areas in primary forest where it favors vegetation near granite outcrops. It can also be found at the edges of low vegetation near rivers, semi-deciduous forest, and cerrado.

== Behavior ==
=== Movement ===
The fiery-tailed awlbill is believed to be sedentary.

=== Feeding ===
The fiery-tailed awlbill is a "trap-line" feeder, visiting a circuit of flowering plants to collect nectar. It favors Clusia and Dioclea shrubs, and feeds both by inserting its bill into flowers and by piercing the base of flowers to "rob" nectar. It also catches arthropods on the wing and by gleaning from the underside of leaves.

=== Breeding ===
The fiery-tailed awlbill's breeding season varies across its range. It is known to span from September to December in Suriname and there are records from July in northern Brazil and French Guiana. The female builds a small cup nest of soft plant materials and spider silk on a horizontal branch, usually between 5 and 12 m (16 and 39 ft) above the ground. The female alone incubates the clutch of two eggs.

=== Vocalization ===
The fiery-tailed awlbill's song has not been recorded. Its call is "a series of 'tsik' notes" and is given in flight or while hovering.

== Status ==
The IUCN originally assessed the fiery-tailed awlbill as Near Threatened but since 2004 has rated it as being of Least Concern. Its population size is unknown and is believed to be decreasing. It is widespread but "generally considered rare" and has restricted habitat requirements. It does occur in several protected areas.
