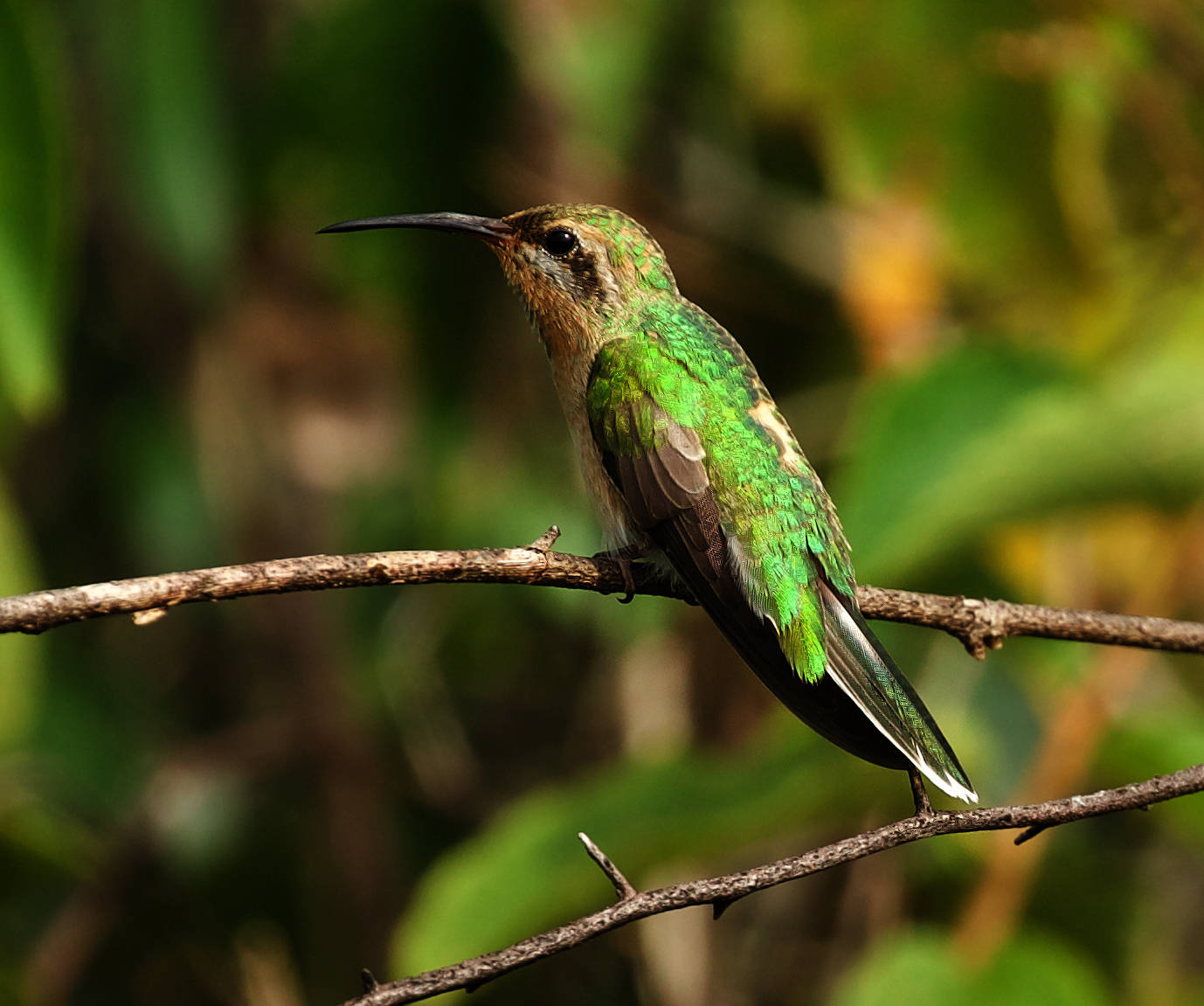
- female bird

Conservation status
- Least Concern (IUCN 3.1)
- CITES Appendix II

Scientific classification
- Kingdom: Animalia
- Phylum: Chordata
- Class: Aves
- Order: Apodiformes
- Family: Trochilidae
- Genus: Polytmus
- Species: P. milleri

Binomial name
- Polytmus milleri (Chapman, 1929)

Synonyms
- Waldronia milleri (protonym)

= Tepui goldenthroat =

Species of hummingbird

The tepui goldenthroat (Polytmus milleri) is a species of hummingbird in the subfamily Polytminae, the mangoes. It is found in Brazil, Guyana, and Venezuela.

== Taxonomy and systematics ==
The tepui goldenthroat was at one time placed in the monotypic genus Waldronia that was later merged into Polytmus. It is monotypic.

== Description ==
The tepui goldenthroat is 11 to 12 cm (4.3 to 4.7 in) long. Males weigh 4.5 to 6.1 g (0.16 to 0.22 oz) and females 4.1 to 5 g (0.14 to 0.18 oz). Males have bronzy green upperparts and glittering green underparts. The tail is shades of green with a wide white band at the base and white tips. The area around the eye is dusky gray with white streaks above and below it. The female is smaller than the male and has dull white underparts heavily dotted with golden-green, especially on the breast. Juveniles are like the adults but with buffy edges to the head's feathers.

== Distribution and habitat ==
The tepui goldenthroat is found only on the eponymous tepuis of southern and southeastern Venezuela and slightly into western Guyana and extreme northern Brazil. On these isolated flat-topped mountains it inhabits the edge of cloudforest and scrublands with scattered trees at elevations between 1,300 and 2,200 m (4,300 and 7,200 ft).

== Behavior ==
=== Movement ===
The tepui goldenthroat is generally sedentary but makes some elevational dispersal after breeding.

=== Feeding ===
The tepui goldenthroat is "trap-line" feeder, visiting a circuit of a variety of flowering plants for nectar. It also catches insects on the wing and gleans spiders from vegetation and rock cavities.

=== Breeding ===
The tepui goldenthroat breeds in May and June. It builds a cup nest lined with fine fibers and decorated on the outside with lichen. It places it in a branch fork of a shrub, typically between 0.5 and 1 m (1.6 and 3.3 ft) above the ground. The clutch size is two eggs. The incubation time is 15 to 16 days.

=== Vocalization ===
The tepui goldenthroat gives a "loud series of 'tsit' or 'tizzie' notes" while foraging.

== Status ==
The IUCN has assessed the tepui goldenthroat as being of Least Concern, though its population size and trend are unknown. It is considered uncommon to locally common in its restricted range.
