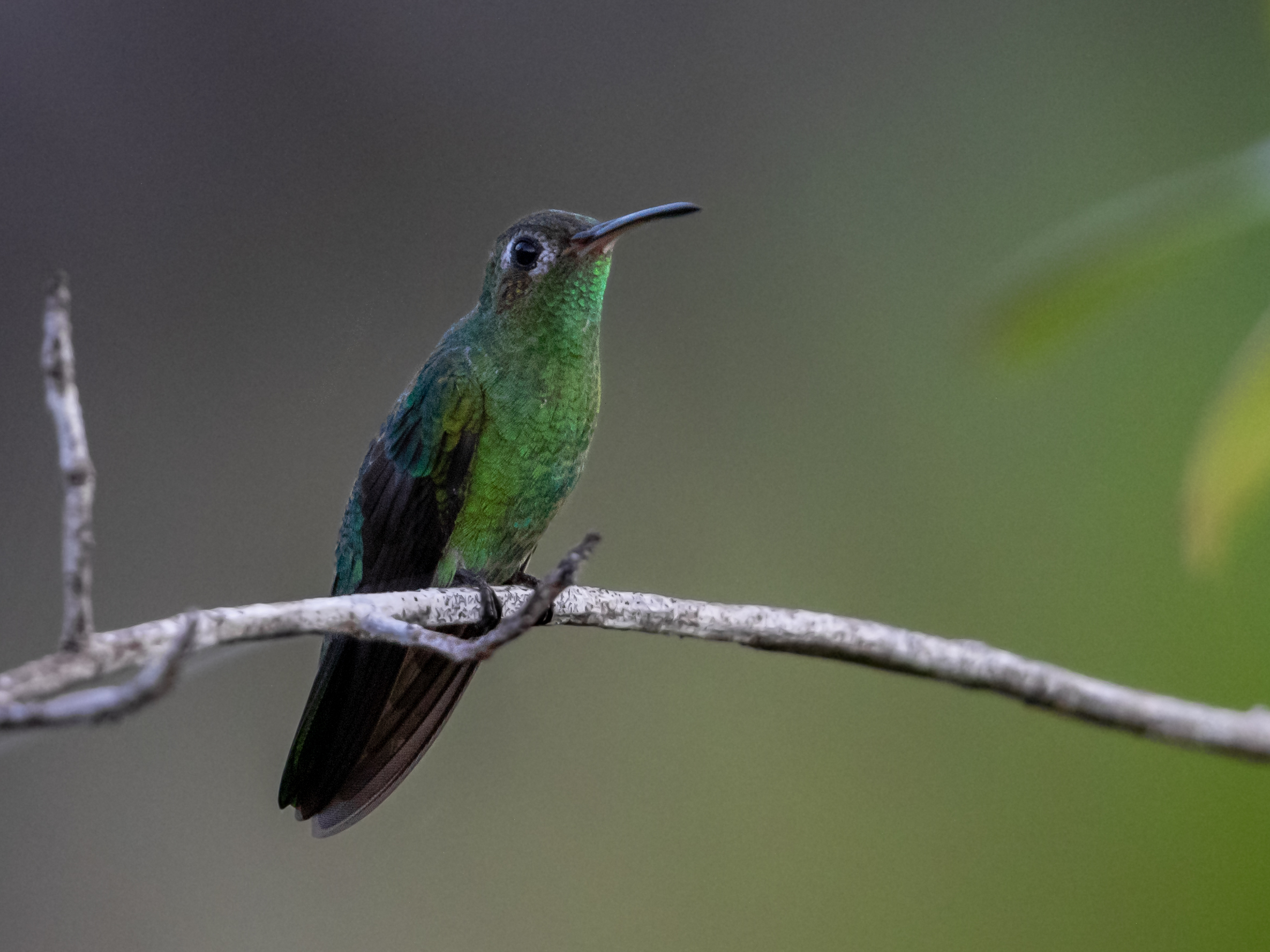

Conservation status
- Least Concern (IUCN 3.1)
- CITES Appendix II (CITES)

Scientific classification
- Kingdom: Animalia
- Phylum: Chordata
- Class: Aves
- Clade: Strisores
- Order: Apodiformes
- Family: Trochilidae
- Genus: Polytmus
- Species: P. theresiae

Binomial name
- Polytmus theresiae (Silva Maia, 1843)
- Range of Polytmus theresiae

= Green-tailed goldenthroat =

Species of hummingbird

The green-tailed goldenthroat (Polytmus theresiae) is a species of hummingbird in the subfamily Polytminae, the mangoes. It is found in Bolivia, Brazil, Colombia, French Guiana, Guyana, Peru, Suriname, and Venezuela, and possibly Ecuador.

== Taxonomy and systematics ==
The green-tailed goldenthroat was at one time placed in the monotypic genus Psilomycter, then in Smaragdites which had priority; the latter was later merged into Polytmus. The green-tailed goldenthroat has two subspecies, the nominate P. t. theresiae and P. t. leucorrhous.

== Description ==
The green-tailed goldenthroat is 8.9 to 9.9 cm (3.5 to 3.9 in) long and weighs 3.0 to 3.9 g (0.11 to 0.14 oz). Both sexes of both subspecies have a long slightly decurved pinkish and black bill. The male of the nominate subspecies is overall shining green. The tail is rounded and green, with all but the central pair of feathers having white at their base. The area around the eye is dusky gray with a white spot behind the eye. The female is smaller. Its throat and breast are whitish thickly spotted with green, and the outermost tail feathers have white tips. Juveniles are like the adult female but with buffy edges to the head's feathers. P. t. leucorrhous is essentially the same as the nominate but for having a white vent area and undertail coverts.

== Distribution and habitat ==
The nominate subspecies of green-tailed goldenthroat is found in the Guianas and north-central Brazil from the lower Negro and Madeira rivers east into the states of Pará and Amapá. P. t. leucorrhous is found from eastern Colombia and southern Venezuela into the upper Negro River area of Brazil, and separately in eastern Peru and northern Bolivia. In addition, the South American Classification Committee (SACC) of the American Ornithological Society lists it as hypothetical in Ecuador. The species inhabits the edges of sand-soil forest and sandy savanna with scattered small trees and stands of bushes. In elevation it generally ranges between 100 and 300 m (330 and 980 ft).

== Behavior ==
=== Movement ===
The green-tailed goldenthroat is essentially sedentary. However, some January and February movement into coastal mangroves has been noted in Suriname.

=== Feeding ===
The green-tailed goldenthroat is primarily a "trap-line" feeder, visiting a circuit of a flowering plants, mostly Melastomataceae, for nectar. The male will sometimes defend a feeding territory. Both sexes also catch arthropods on the wing and by gleaning from leaves.

=== Breeding ===
The green-tailed goldenthroat's breeding seasons vary across its range, from March, April, and August to October in the Guianas, October and November in Venezuela, and November to March in Brazil. The female alone builds the nest, incubates the eggs, and cares for the young. The nest is a cup of fine plant fibers and spider silk built in a fork of a low shrub. The clutch size is two eggs. The incubation time is 14 days with fledging 20 to sometimes as long as 28 days after hatch.

=== Vocalization ===
The green-tailed goldenthroat's song is "a repeated, long whinnying series of 20–25 notes, first rising then slightly falling, and fading at the end, typically with a single introductory note". The isolated Peruvian population has a similar but faster song with trills. The species also makes "single 'tsit' notes."

== Status ==
The IUCN has assessed the green-tailed goldenthroat as being of Least Concern, though its population size and trend are unknown. It is common to locally abundant in the northern part of its range.
