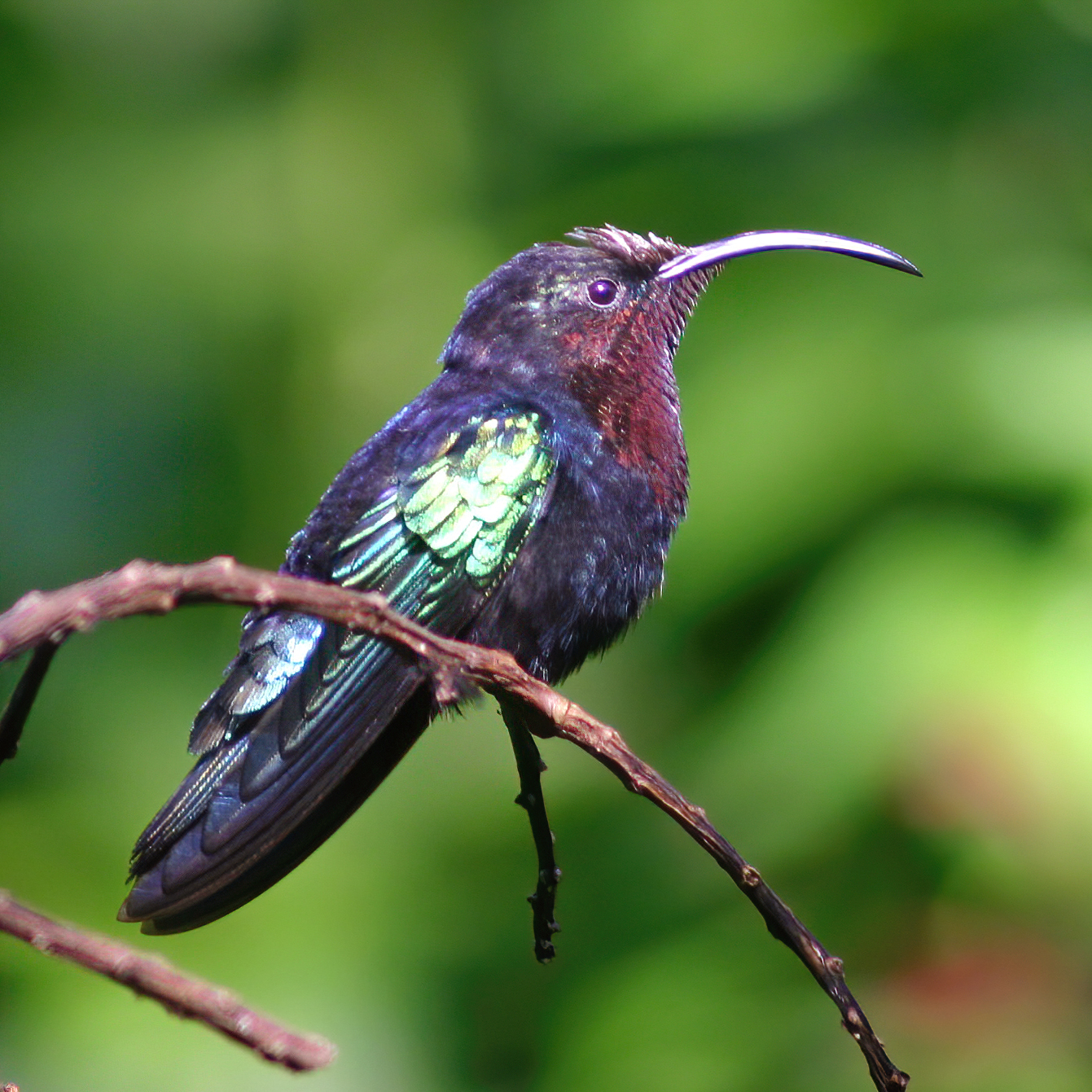
- Purple-throated carib in Morne Diablotin National Park, Dominica

Conservation status
- Least Concern (IUCN 3.1)
- CITES Appendix II

Scientific classification
- Kingdom: Animalia
- Phylum: Chordata
- Class: Aves
- Clade: Strisores
- Order: Apodiformes
- Family: Trochilidae
- Genus: Eulampis
- Species: E. jugularis

Binomial name
- Eulampis jugularis (Linnaeus, 1766)

Synonyms
- Trochilus jugularis Linnaeus, 1766

= Purple-throated carib =

Species of hummingbird

The purple-throated carib (Eulampis jugularis) is a species of hummingbird in the subfamily Polytminae. It is resident on most of the islands of the Lesser Antilles and has occurred as a vagrant both further north and south.

== Taxonomy and systematics ==
The purple-throated carib was formally described by the Swedish naturalist Carl Linnaeus in 1766 in the twelfth edition of his Systema Naturae under the binomial name Trochilus jugularis. Linnaeus based his short description on the "red breasted humming bird" that had been described and illustrated by the English naturalist George Edwards and the "colibry violet de Cayenne" that had been described and illustrated by the French zoologist Mathurin Jacques Brisson. Edwards believed his specimen had come from Suriname, Brisson believed his specimen had come from Cayenne, but both authors were mistaken, as the purple-throated carib is only found on the islands of the Lesser Antilles. The specific epithet jugularis is Medieval Latin for "of the throat". The purple-throated carib is the type species of the genus Eulampis that was introduced in 1831 by the German zoologist Friedrich Boie and which it shares with the green-throated carib (E. holosericeus). The species is monotypic: No subspecies are recognized.

== Description ==
The purple-throated carib is 11 to 12 cm (4.3 to 4.7 in) long. Males weigh 9 to 12 g (0.32 to 0.42 oz) and females 7 to 10 g (0.25 to 0.35 oz); specimens of unrecorded sex weighed 6.7 to 10.8 g (0.24 to 0.38 oz). The adult male and female have the same plumage. Their crown and back are velvety black, the throat and chest fiery purplish red, the wings bright golden green, and the tail and its upper and lower coverts metallic greenish blue. The male has a medium length slightly decurved bill; the female's is longer and more strongly curved. Immatures have an orange throat and chest with red speckles.

== Distribution and habitat ==
The purple-throated carib is resident on Antigua, Dominica, Guadeloupe, Martinique, Montserrat, Saba, Saint Kitts and Nevis, Saint Lucia, Saint Vincent and Sint Eustatius. It has occurred as a vagrant in Barbados, Barbuda, Grenada and the Greater Antilles. It inhabits the interior and edges of primary and secondary forest, mostly at elevations between 800 and 1,200 m (2,600 and 3,900 ft).

== Behavior ==
=== Movement ===
The purple-throated carib is generally sedentary. On St. Lucia and St. Vincent it has been recorded at sea level in late May.

=== Feeding ===
The purple-throated carib feeds primarily on nectar of flowering trees from the middle levels to the treetops. Males defend flower-centered feeding territories year round and females during the non-breeding season. The species also feeds on small arthropods, catching them on the wing and gleaning them from leaves, flowers, and spider webs.

=== Breeding ===
The purple-throated carib nests mostly between February and May, but the season may start as early as January and extend to September. It makes a small cup nest from soft plant fibers and spider silk, and sometimes attaches lichens and bark strips to the outside. It attaches the nest to a vertical tree branch, typically between 3 and 5 m (10 and 16 ft) above the ground. Females are strongly territorial around the nest. The clutch is two eggs. The incubation time is 17 to 19 days with fledging 17 to 20 days after hatch.

=== Vocalization ===
The purple-throated carib's calls include "strident 'tsip' and sharp 'chewp'" notes that it repeats rapidly when agitated.

== Status ==
The IUCN has assessed the purple-throated carib as being of Least Concern, though its population size and trend are not known. Though it is restricted to a chain of small islands, it is a common resident in its elevation range. "Ready occupation of man-made habitats suggests that habitat loss is unlikely to be a problem."
