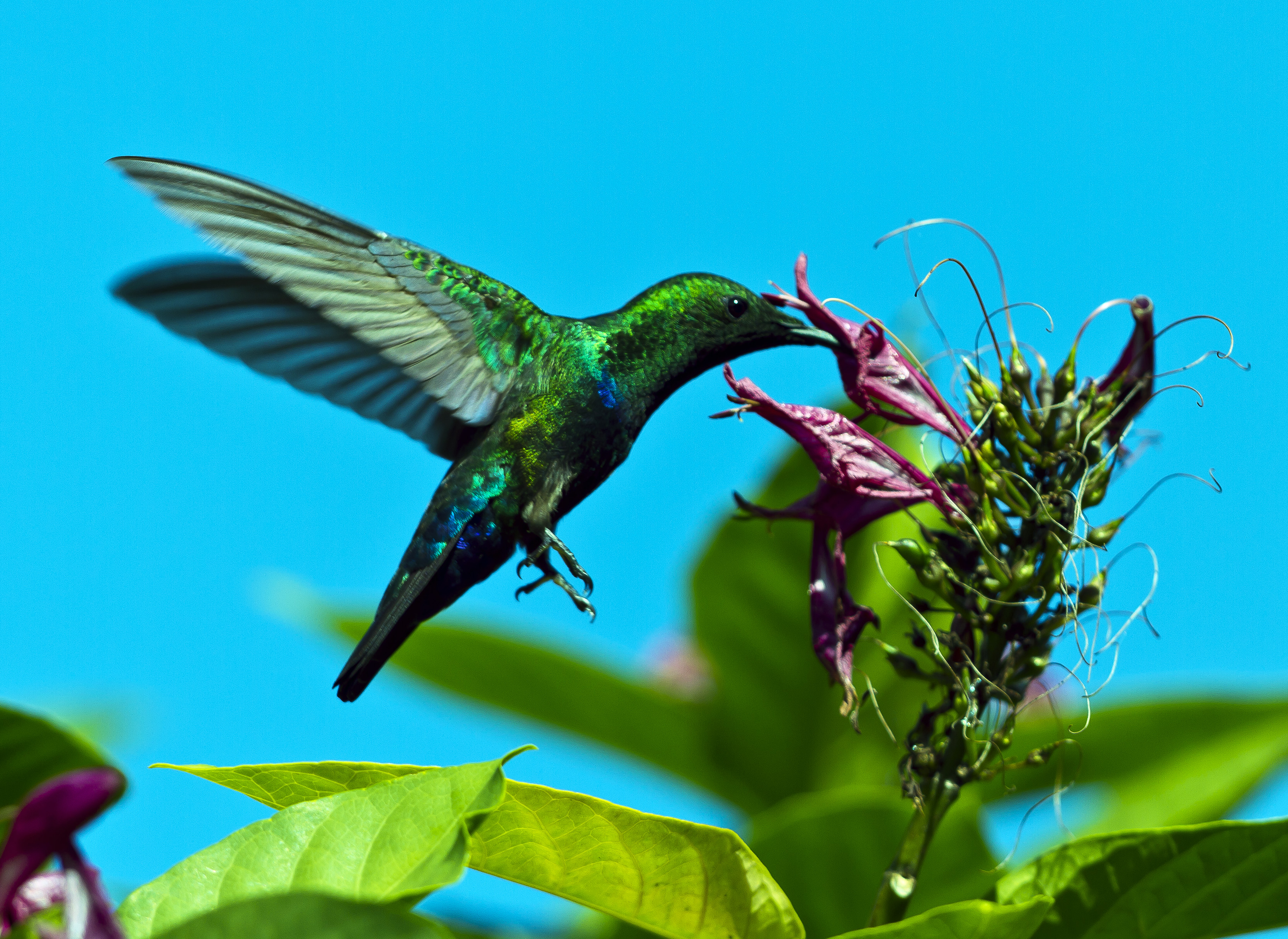
- in Barbados

Conservation status
- Least Concern (IUCN 3.1)
- CITES Appendix II (CITES)

Scientific classification
- Kingdom: Animalia
- Phylum: Chordata
- Class: Aves
- Clade: Strisores
- Order: Apodiformes
- Family: Trochilidae
- Genus: Eulampis
- Species: E. holosericeus

Binomial name
- Eulampis holosericeus (Linnaeus, 1758)

Synonyms
- Trochilus holosericeus Linnaeus, 1758

= Green-throated carib =

Species of hummingbird

The green-throated carib (Eulampis holosericeus) is a species of hummingbird in the subfamily Polytminae. It is found in Puerto Rico and most of the Lesser Antilles.

== Taxonomy and systematics ==
The green-throated carib was formally described by the Swedish naturalist Carl Linnaeus in 1758 in the tenth edition of his Systema Naturae under the binomial name Trochilus holosericeus. Linnaeus based his description on the "black-belly'd green huming bird" that had been described and illustrated by the English naturalist George Edwards in 1743. The type locality is the Lesser Antilles. The specific name is from the Ancient Greek holosērikos meaning "silken". The green-throated carib is now placed in the genus Eulampis that was introduced by the German zoologist Friedrich Boie in 1831 and which it shares with the purple-throated carib (E. jugularis).

Two subspecies are recognized, the nominate E. h. holosericeus (Linnaeus, 1758) and E. h. chlorolaemus (Gould, 1857).

== Description ==
The green-throated carib is a large hummingbird, 10.5 to 12 cm (4.1 to 4.7 in) long. Both sexes have a bright green back, though the female's is duller, and a bright green gorget. The male's gorget has a blue border that is usually not apparent. Males and females have a black belly, a green vent area, and a dark blue tail that appears black in poor light. The underparts of subspecies E. h. chlorolaemus are somewhat darker than those of the nominate. Males have a medium length slightly decurved bill; the female's is longer and more strongly curved.

The calls include a sharp chup! or chuwp!. During territorial disputes it sometimes makes rattles and whirs with its wings.

== Distribution and habitat ==
The green-throated carib is generally sedentary but some are known to move to wetter areas after the breeding season. The nominate subspecies is found from eastern Puerto Rico through the Virgin Islands and the Lesser Antilles chain as far as (but not including) Grenada. E. h. chlorolaemus is endemic to Grenada. The species inhabits a variety of landscapes including wet forest, semi-deciduous forest, cultivated areas, gardens, and parks. On Martinique it is also found in drier habitat. On many islands it is most common near sea level though on Dominica it is found mostly in foothills.

== Behavior ==
=== Feeding ===
The green-throated carib feeds on the nectar of a variety of flowering shrubs and trees. Males are believed to defend flowering feeding territories all year but females do so only in the non-breeding season. The species also feeds on small arthropods such as insects and spiders, mostly caught on the wing.

=== Breeding ===
The green-throated carib is believed to nest between March and July, and might depend on the timing of rain. Its nest is a cup lined with soft fibers and has lichen and bark chips attached to the outside. It is usually placed in the fork of a branch 2 to 9 m (7 to 30 ft) above the ground. The clutch is two eggs. The incubation time is 17 to 19 days with fledging 20 to 22 days after hatch. Birds first breed in their second year and may nest twice in a year.

== Status ==
The IUCN has assessed the green-throated carib as being of Least Concern, though its population size and trend are not known. It has a restricted range but is described as common in much of it. The species "adapts well to human-affected habitats such as second growth gardens and vegetation around homes" but because its movement patterns are not fully understood, habitat fragmentation might be a threat.
