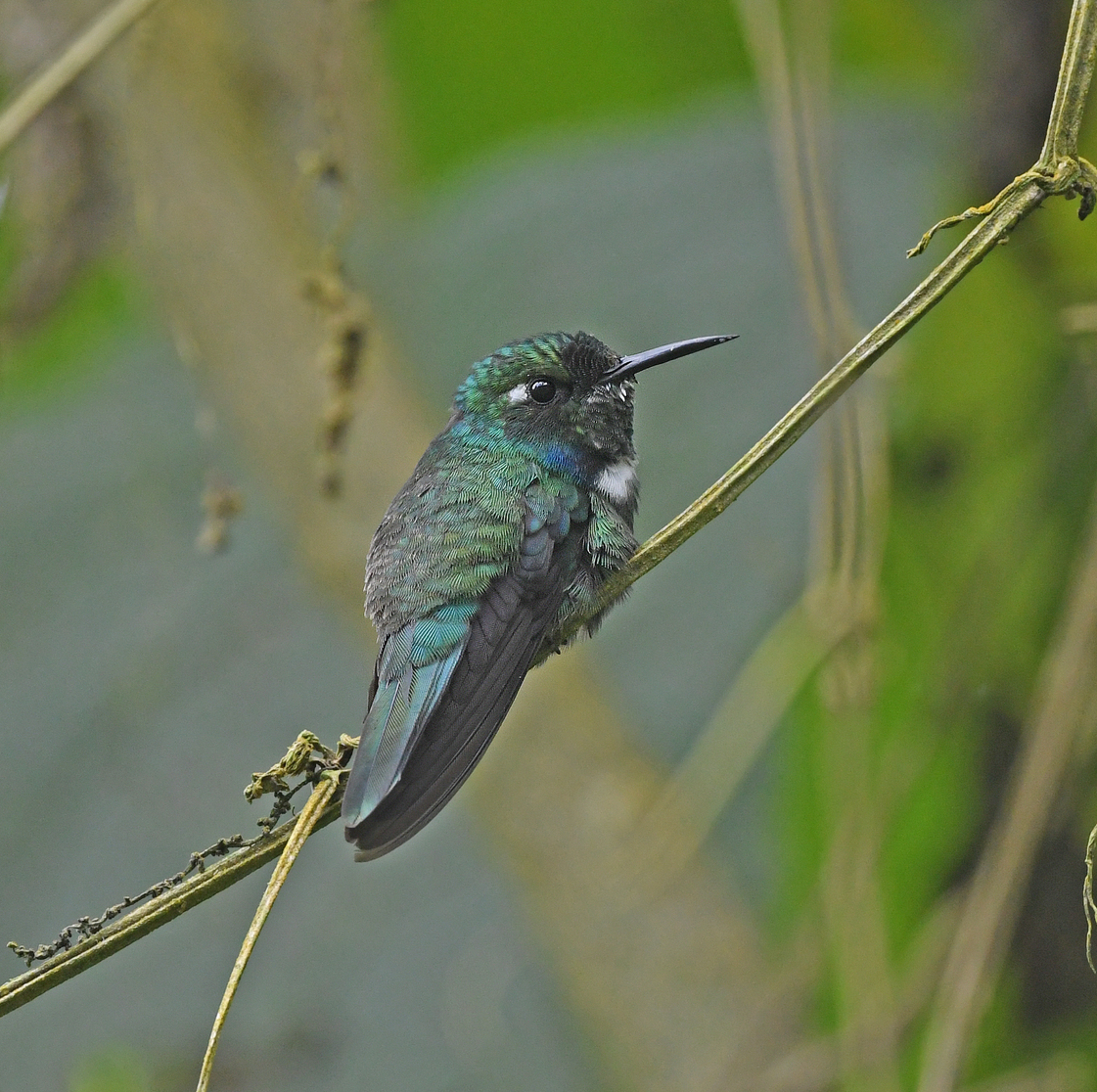

Conservation status
- Least Concern (IUCN 3.1)
- CITES Appendix II

Scientific classification
- Kingdom: Animalia
- Phylum: Chordata
- Class: Aves
- Order: Apodiformes
- Family: Trochilidae
- Genus: Schistes
- Species: S. albogularis

Binomial name
- Schistes albogularis Gould, 1852

Synonyms
- Schistes geoffroyi albogularis

= White-throated daggerbill =

Species of hummingbird

The white-throated daggerbill, white-throated wedgebill, or western wedge-billed hummingbird (Schistes albogularis) is a species of hummingbird in the family Trochilidae. It is found in Colombia and Ecuador.

== Taxonomy and systematics ==
The white-throated daggerbill has often been considered conspecific with what is now the only other member of its genus, Geoffroy's daggerbill (S. geoffroyi) under the name "wedge-billed hummingbird". The South American Classification Committee (SACC) of the American Ornithological Society split them in June 2018 and the International Ornithological Committee (IOC), the Clements taxonomy, and BirdLife International's Handbook of the Birds of the World (HBW) followed suit. Later all of them except HBW adopted the "daggerbill" English name; HBW uses the name "western wedge-billed hummingbird". Some authors have suggested that the genus be merged into that of the visorbearers, Augastes. The white-throated daggerbill is monotypic.

== Description ==
The white-throated daggerbill is 8.6 to 9.3 cm (3.4 to 3.7 in) long and weighs 3.5 to 4.1 g (0.12 to 0.14 oz). It gets its name from the tip of its bill, which is very narrow and sharply pointed. Both sexes are generally green overall. Males have a shiny green forehead, violet-blue patches on the sides of the throat that can extend well up into the face, a white band across the upper chest, and a small white patch behind the eye. Females' foreheads are not shiny, the throat patches are smaller and mostly blue, and they have an unmarked white throat.

== Distribution and habitat ==
The white-throated daggerbill is found from the western Andes and the west slope of the Central Andes of Colombia south into western Ecuador. It inhabits the interior and edges of dense cloudforest, often near streams. In elevation it ranges between 800 and 2,000 m (2,600 and 6,600 ft).

== Behavior ==
=== Movement ===
The white-throated daggerbill is mostly sedentary but makes some elevational dispersion after the breeding season.

=== Feeding ===
The white-throated daggerbill forages in dense vegetation from near the ground to medium heights. It collects nectar from tubular flowers of a variety of shrubs, vines, and small trees and often "robs" nectar by piercing the base of a flower. It also captures small insects on the wing or sometimes by gleaning from vegetation.

=== Breeding ===
Nothing is known about the white-throated daggerbill's breeding phenology.

=== Vocalization ===
The white-throated daggerbill's song is "a series of two different high-pitched notes repeated, 'tsit...seet...tsit...seet...', at an irregular pace".

== Status ==
The IUCN has assessed the white-throated daggerbill as being of Least Concern. Though its population size is unknown it is believed to be stable. It is considered rare to locally common and occurs in several protected areas.
