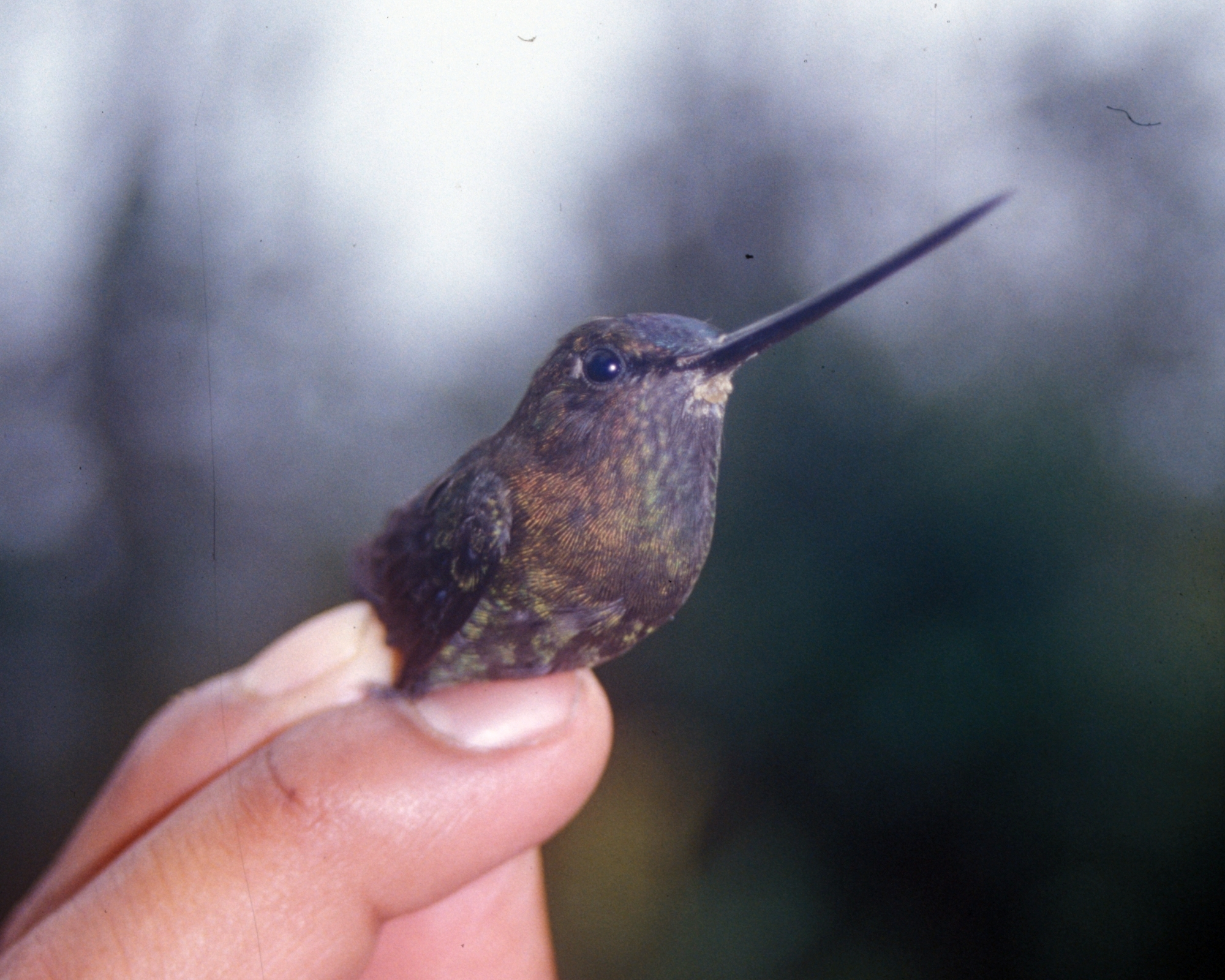

Conservation status
- Least Concern (IUCN 3.1)
- CITES Appendix II

Scientific classification
- Kingdom: Animalia
- Phylum: Chordata
- Class: Aves
- Order: Apodiformes
- Family: Trochilidae
- Genus: Doryfera
- Species: D. ludovicae

Binomial name
- Doryfera ludovicae (Bourcier & Mulsant, 1847)

Audio

= Green-fronted lancebill =

Species of bird

The green-fronted lancebill (Doryfera ludovicae) is a species of hummingbird in the family Trochilidae. Primarily known for its very long bill and "glittering" green patch of feathers on its forehead, D. ludovicae is found in subtropical and tropical moist montane forest and prefers regions that include fast moving rivers and streams.

== Taxonomy ==
The green-fronted lancebill is generally known by its species name Doryfera ludovicae but has been divided into the two subspecies D. ludovicae ludovicae and D. ludovicae veraguensis due to variation in geographic distribution.

Originally placed in Phaethornithinae due its nest, recent examination of the genus has found it to be included in the "mango group" defined as including Androdon, Anthracothorax, Chrysolampis, Colibri, Doryfera, Eulampis, Heliactin, Heliothryx, Polytmus, and Schistes.

The most recent research has found evidence to suggest that Doryfera can be further refined into a monophyletic group consisting of three genera Doryfera, Schistes and, Colibri.

== Description ==
The green-fronted lancebill, as the name suggests, is distinguished by a "glittering" green patch of feathers on their forehead. Between males and females, males consistently have a prominent forehead patch, however, literature is inconsistent on the appearance of females. One notable source claims females can vary widely between individuals, stating the female forehead with regards to both feather development and color intensity, can range from barely visible to indistinguishable from common male plumage.

Body plumage is uniform regardless of sex with both males and females having a drab grey-green breast and belly. A coppery patch extends from the nape and down along the sides of the neck. This meets a rich green that occupies much of the crown except for the eponymous green forehead patch.

Much of the back and dorsal face of the tail are a similar rich green as the green with an iridescence creating a situational alternation between green, teal, and turquoise.

The last feature that distinguishes the green-fronted lancebill is its eponymous bill. The bill is exceptionally long for any hummingbird (ranging from 29mm to 36.5mm with variation primarily attributed to regional populations) and is the inspiration for the genus name Doryfera translating roughly to "spear bearer".

In physical dimension, a size difference between male and females has not been identified with regards to body length and beak proportions.

== Distribution and habitat ==
It has a disjunct distribution : Talamancan montane forests, the Serranía del Darién and the northern Andes. It is not considered migratory.

This species and its sister species Doryfera johannae are found in highly developed forest locations adjacent to fast-moving streams. It is theorized that the specific needs of the species cause it to concentrate around ideal sites rather than be dispersed evenly around forested mountainsides.

== Ecology and behavior ==
=== Feeding ===
The green-fronted lancebill like many hummingbirds is known for its distinct bill shape. Each shape serving to match a floral counterpart creating a system where in a particular ecosystem the floral-hummingbird partners are mutually reliant on one another for consistent access to their necessary resources, food in the form of nectar for the hummingbird and pollination for the flower. The degree to which a hummingbird adapts to a flower dictates how much of their resources (expended energy) that individual must exert in order to gather nectar. When a hummingbird is poorly matched to a flower. i.e. when the curvature and length of their bill is very different from the corolla of the flower they are gathering from, the handling time increases. This disincentivizes seeking flowers outside of a hummingbird's adaptive niche, and allows for a system of ecosystem resource partitioning.

The green-fronted lancebill, having a particularly long and slightly upturned bill, has not been identified as having a single species partner but would benefit most from flowers with equally long corollas bearing a slight curve.

The green-fronted lancebill feeds on the nectar of epiphytes, including mistletoe.

=== Nesting ===
During nest construction only the female green-fronted lancebill works to construct the nests. Nest site location is consistently attached to the side of a vertical overhang in which the nest is covered by the surface it is attached to i.e. a cliff face where the top of the cliff shelters the nest from rain and other weather. Nest materials are almost always some combination of spider web, moss, and lichen in which the spider web serves as the adhesive anchor, binding the nest to the rock or soil face. Occasionally, nests can be found built not on the rock face but suspended on the inner side of the moss growing on and around the cliff overhang.

Nests tend to be built adjacent to or above fast-moving freshwater features.

Incubation time is 20–21 days once hatched chicks are born highly altricial and need a nestling period of 29–30 days.

== Relationship with humans ==
Nest sites tend to be built away from human development and contact, although study on the effects of direct human contact is limited and so the exact variables causing human adverse tendencies has yet to be formally identified.

== Conservation status ==
Conservation directed towards this species is minimal as well as research around it and similar species, Doryfera johannae the blue-fronted lancebill. However the green-fronted lancebill is classified by the IUCN as "least concern" due to its broad range and assumption of stable populations over 10,000 mature individuals.
