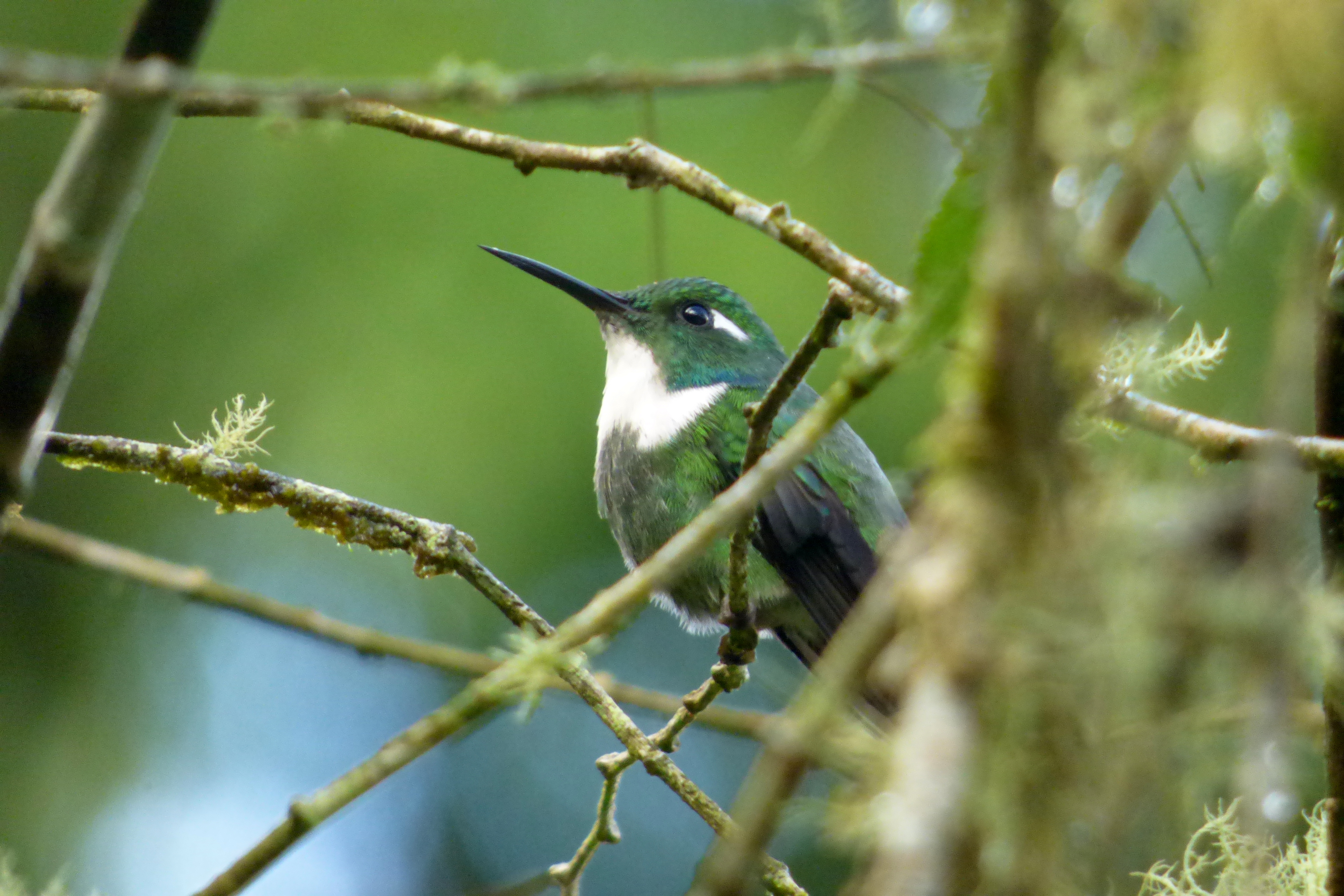

Conservation status
- Least Concern (IUCN 3.1)
- CITES Appendix II

Scientific classification
- Kingdom: Animalia
- Phylum: Chordata
- Class: Aves
- Order: Apodiformes
- Family: Trochilidae
- Genus: Schistes
- Species: S. geoffroyi

Binomial name
- Schistes geoffroyi (Bourcier, 1843)

Synonyms
- Augastes geoffroyi (Bourcier, 1843)

Audio

= Geoffroy's daggerbill =

Species of hummingbird

Geoffroy's daggerbill, Geoffroy's wedgebill, or eastern wedge-billed hummingbird (Schistes geoffroyi) is a species of hummingbird in the family Trochilidae. It is found in Bolivia, Colombia, Ecuador, Peru, and Venezuela.

== Taxonomy and systematics ==
Geoffroy's daggerbill has often been considered conspecific with what is now the only other member of its genus, the white-throated daggerbill (S. albogularis), under the name "wedge-billed hummingbird". The South American Classification Committee (SACC) of the American Ornithological Society split them in June 2018 and the International Ornithological Committee (IOC), the Clements taxonomy, and BirdLife International's Handbook of the Birds of the World (HBW) followed suit. Later all of them except HBW adopted the "daggerbill" English name; HBW uses the name "eastern wedge-billed hummingbird". Some authors have suggested that the genus be merged into that of the visorbearers, Augastes.

Geoffroy's daggerbill has two subspecies, the nominate S. g. geoffroyi and S. g. chapmani.

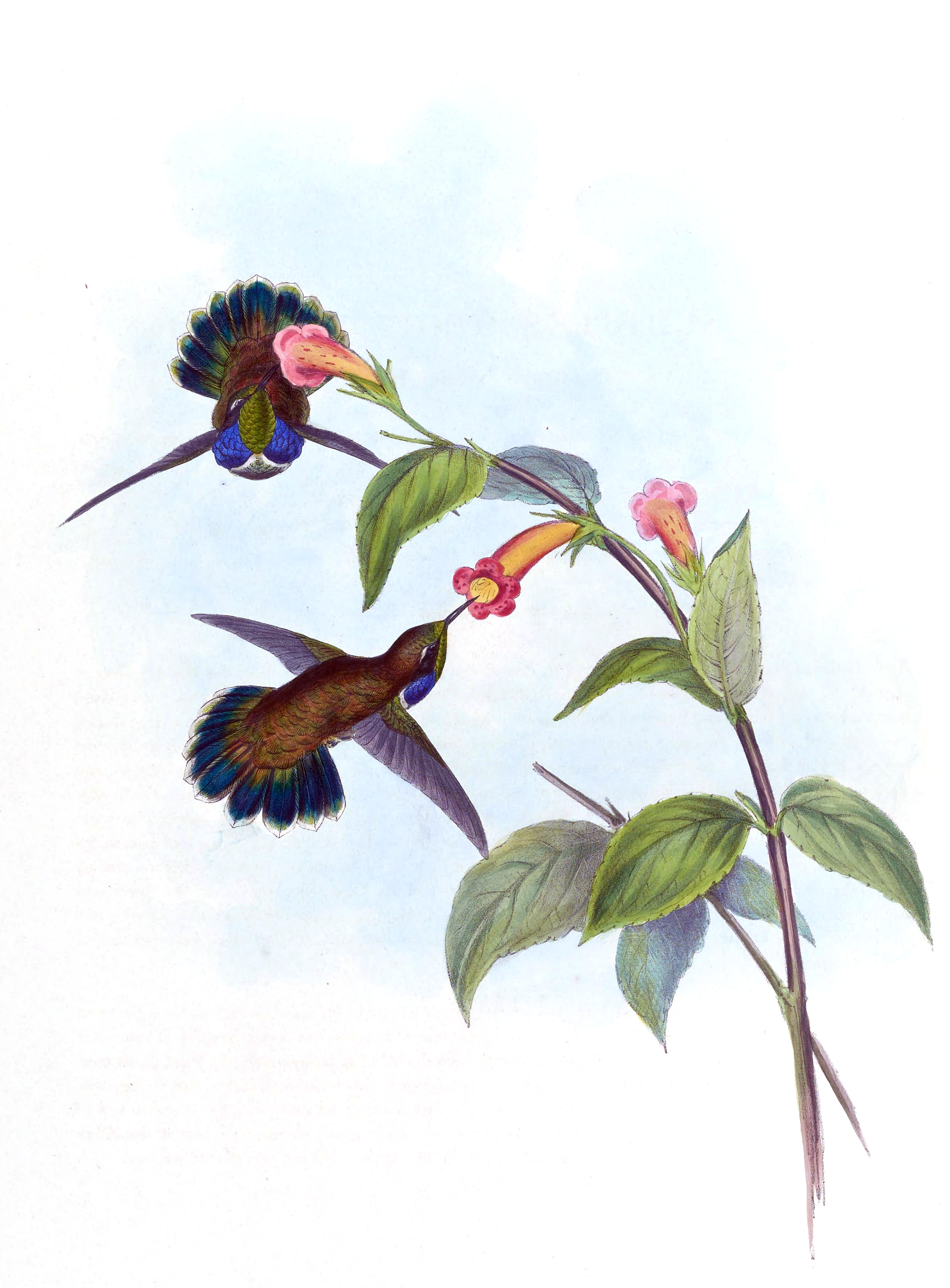

== Description ==
Geoffroy's daggerbill is 8.6 to 9.3 cm (3.4 to 3.7 in) long and weighs 3.5 to 4.1 g (0.12 to 0.14 oz). It gets its name from the tip of its bill, which is very narrow and sharply pointed, though this characteristic is not easily seen in the field. Males of the nominate subspecies have bronzy green upperparts with a coppery cast to the rump. They have glittery violet patches on the sides of the iridescent golden-green throat, white patches on either side of the upper chest, and an elongated white patch behind the eye. Their underpars are green. Females' throats are white with green speckles but they are otherwise like the male. S. g. chapmani is similar to the nominate but has no white patches on the throat.

== Distribution and habitat ==
The nominate subspecies of Geoffroy's daggerbill is found from the Sierra de Perijá and Coastal Range of Venezuela south along the Andes through eastern Colombia and eastern Ecuador into Peru as far as Cuzco. S. g. chapmani is found from Cuzco into central Bolivia. The species inhabits the interior and edges of dense cloudforest. In elevation it usually ranges between 900 and 2,300 m (3,000 and 7,500 ft) and has been recorded as high as 2,500 m (8,200 ft) in Ecuador and 2,800 m (9,200 ft) in southeastern Peru.

== Behavior ==
=== Movement ===
Geoffroy's daggerbill is mostly sedentary but makes some elevational dispersion after the breeding season.

=== Feeding ===
Geoffroy's daggerbill forages in dense vegetation from near the ground to medium heights. It collects nectar from tubular flowers of a variety of shrubs, vines, and small trees. It also captures small insects on the wing or sometimes by gleaning from vegetation.

=== Breeding ===
The breeding season of Geoffroy's daggerbill spans from August to November in Venezuela but has not been defined elsewhere. It builds a cup-shaped nest of soft seed fibers and spider silk decorated with lichens on its outer wall. The clutch size is two eggs. Incubation, by the female alone, lasts 15 to 16 days with fledging 20 to 22 days after hatch.

=== Vocalization ===
The song of Geoffroy's daggerbill is "an insect-like series of regularly spaced simple 'tsit' or sibilant 'sink' notes." It is sung from a low perch.

== Status ==
The IUCN has assessed Geoffroy's daggerbill as being of Least Concern. Though its population size is unknown it is believed to be stable. It is considered uncommon to locally common and occurs in several protected areas.
