= Antillean mango =

The Antillean mango was formerly a species of hummingbird with two subspecies. As of mid-2022 the former subspecies are treated as species in their own right:

- Hispaniolan mango (Anthracothorax dominicus)
- Puerto Rican mango (Anthracothorax aurulentus)
