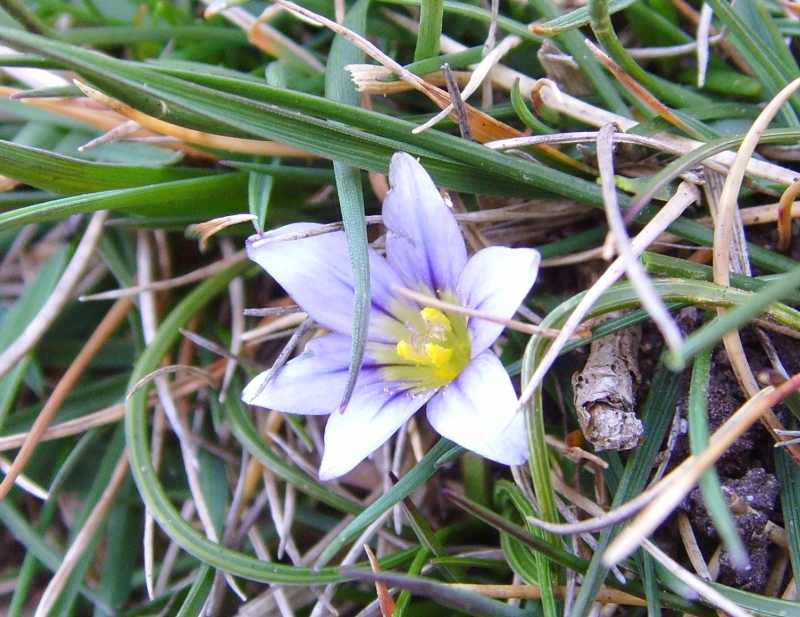

Scientific classification
- Kingdom: Plantae
- Clade: Tracheophytes
- Clade: Angiosperms
- Clade: Monocots
- Order: Asparagales
- Family: Iridaceae
- Genus: Romulea
- Species: R. columnae

Binomial name
- Romulea columnae Sebast. & Mauri

Synonyms
- Synonyms: Bulbocodium columnae (Sebast. & Mauri) Kuntze; Bulbocodium neglectum (Jord. & Fourr.) Kuntze; Ixia columnae (Sebast. & Mauri) Schult.; Ixia minima Ten.; Ixia parviflora Salisb.; Romulea armoricana Jord.; Romulea assumptionis Font Quer; Romulea basileleonis Sennen; Romulea battandieri Bég.; Romulea columnae subsp. assumptionis (Font Quer) O.Bolòs & al.; Romulea columnae subsp. columnae; Romulea columnae var. immaculata Maire; Romulea columnae var. modesta (Jord.) Nyman; Romulea columnae subsp. modesta (Jord.) K.Richt.; Romulea columnae subsp. occidentalis (Bég.) Moret; Romulea columnae var. occidentalis Bég.; Romulea columnae subsp. subalbida (Jord. & Fourr.) K.Richt.; Romulea columnae var. subalbida (Jord. & Fourr.) Nyman; Romulea coronata (Merino) Merino; Romulea coronata var. nivea (Merino) Merino; Romulea corsica var. neglecta (Jord. & Fourr.) Nyman; Romulea erythropoda Jord.; Romulea longiscapa Tod. ex Lojac.; Romulea longistyla Lojac. [Illegitimate]; Romulea micrantha Tineo ex Lojac.; Romulea minima (Ten.) Ten.; Romulea modesta Jord.; Romulea neglecta Jord. & Fourr.; Romulea parlatorei Tod.; Romulea parviflora Bubani [Illegitimate]; Romulea ramiflora subsp. parlatorei (Tod.) K.Richt.; Romulea saccardoana Bég.; Romulea subalbida Jord. & Fourr.; Trichonema columnae (Sebast. & Mauri) Rchb.; Trichonema coronatum Merino; Trichonema coronatum var. niveum Merino; Trichonema minimum Ten.

= Romulea columnae =

Species of flowering plant

Romulea columnae, the sand crocus, is a herbaceous perennial in the family Iridaceae. It is a small plant, with thin narrow leaves, and small scape which has small pink, pale purple or violet pointed flowers with darker veining and a gold or yellow throat. It is native to a wide area ranging from western Europe to the Mediterranean.

== Description ==
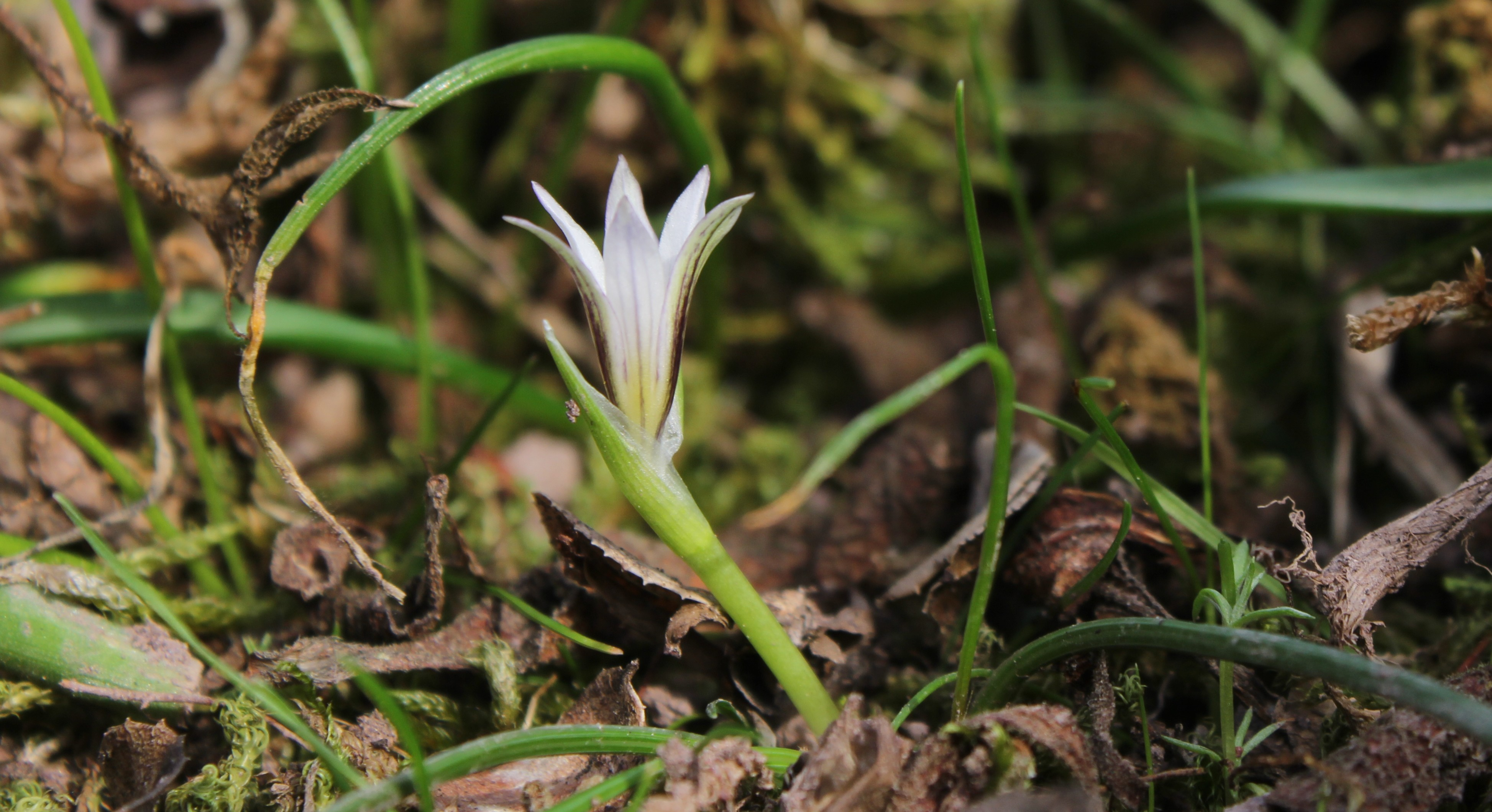
Romulea columnae scape not stem

Romulea columnae grows from a small corm. It has one or two basal leaves, and several (up to 3,) cauline (stem) leaves, They are narrow, wiry and curled, and they can grow up to 10 cm (4 in) long. Plants from the Romulea genus are related to members of the crocus genus and look very similar but have several differences, including that Romulea plants do not have a white grove in the centre of their leaves. Also, crocus flowers are stemless and grow directly from the corm, while Romulea plants hold their flowers on a green scape of various lengths. Romulea columnae has a short scape, of up to 3–20 cm (1–8 in) long. In the UK, it is only between 3–4 cm (1–2 in) tall.

It blooms early in the year, from February onwards, or between March and May. It has one to three flowers per corm, most common is a solitary flower, which is small and only reaching between 10 and 12 mm across. The flowers are funnel-shaped, and have 6 pointed (at the tip) petals, which are equally-sized. They are pink, pale purple, or violet. They are greenish-yellow, yellow, or golden-yellow at the centre or throat. They have purple, or violet veins or a dark midvein and a pair of lighter lateral veins. It has a green spathe which is thin and spindly. It has three stamens, topped by yellow, or bright yellow anthers, and the style is shorter than the stamens.

It reproduces mostly by seed.

== Taxonomy ==
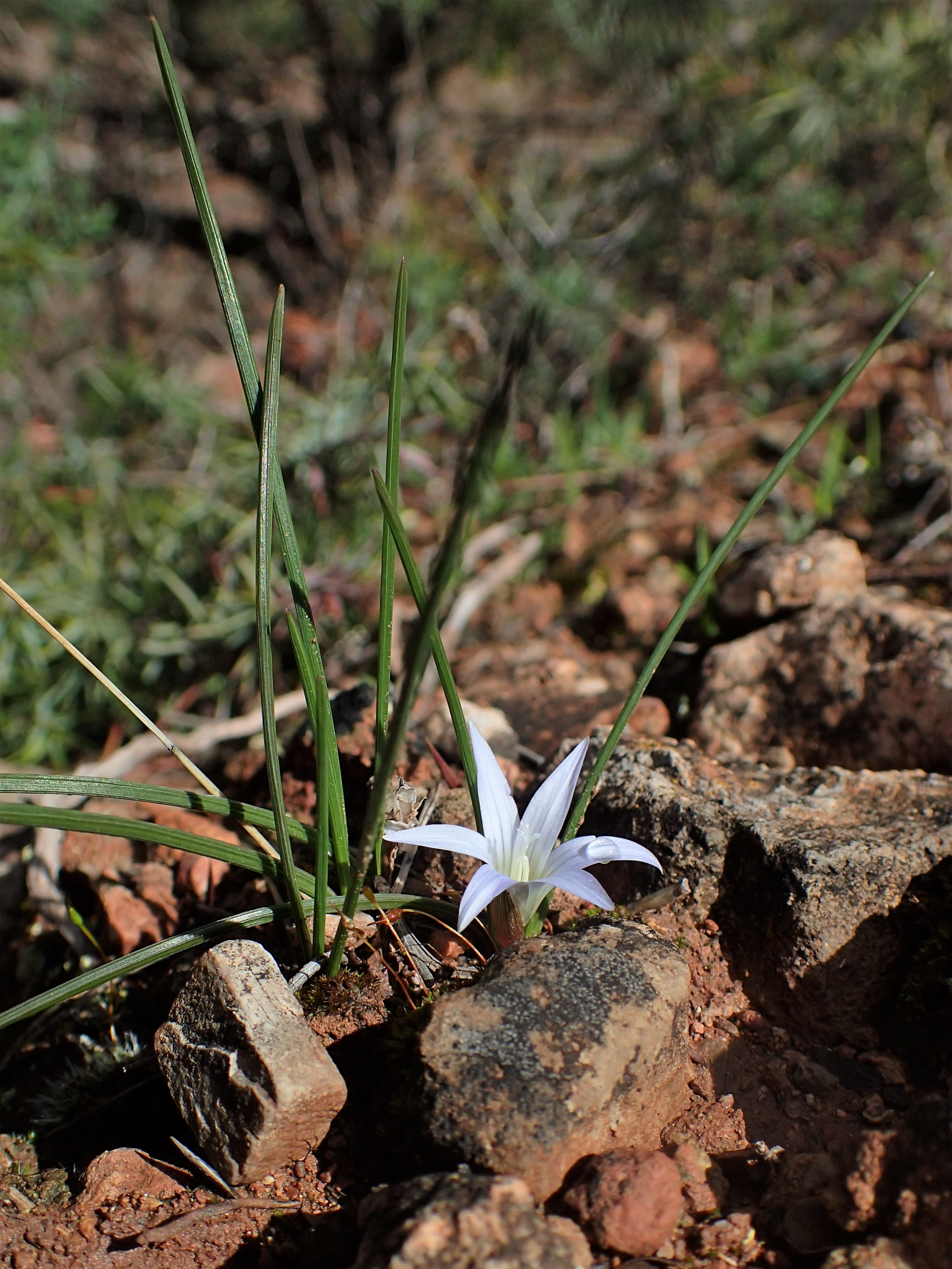
Romulea columnae in Morocco

It is commonly known as sand crocus and occasionally as dune crocus. In Malta, it is known as the Lesser sand crocus due to another endemic Romulea species.

The Latin specific epithet columnae refers to column.

It was published and described by 2 Italian botanists, Francesco Antonio Sebastiani and Ernesto Mauri in 'Fl. Roman. Prodr.' vol.18 in 1818.

Romulea columnae was verified by United States Department of Agriculture Agricultural Research Service on 4 April 2003, and it is an accepted name by the RHS.

There are 4, or 2 known subspecies (grandiscapa and rollii);

- Romulea columnae subsp. assumptionis (Font Quer) O.Bolòs, Vigo, Masalles & Ninot, in Fl. Man. Paísos Catalans: 1215 (1990)
- Romulea columnae subsp. columnae
- Romulea columnae subsp. grandiscapa (Webb) G.Kunkel, Monogr. Biol. Canar. 3: 25 (1972) from the Canary Islands, with a flower that is purple with a yellow throat.
- Romulea columnae subsp. rollii (Parl.) Marais, Kew Bull. 30: 707 (1975 publ. 1976).

== Distribution and habitat ==
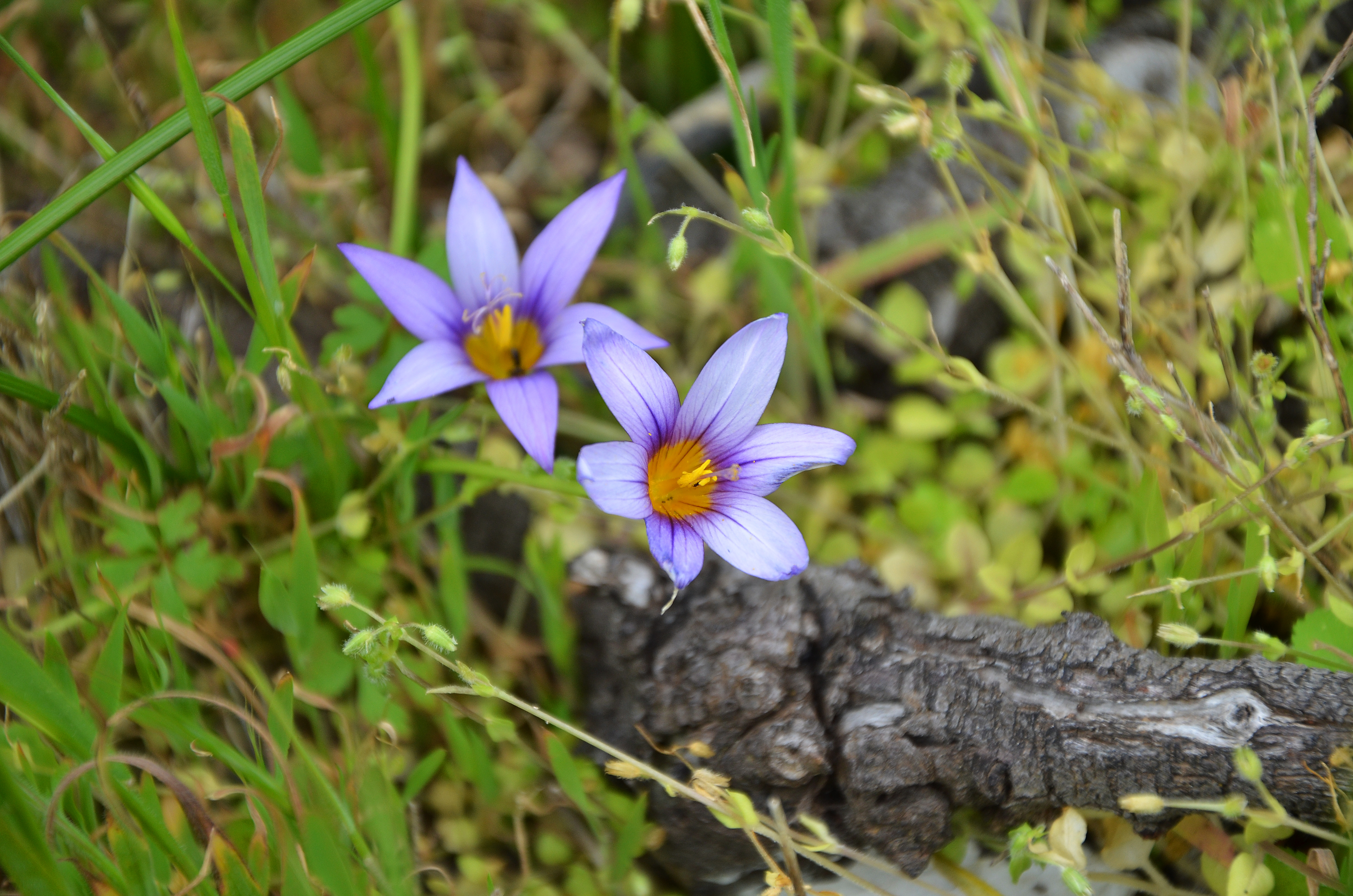
Romulea columnae on El Hierro, one of the Canary Islands

Romulea columnae is native to various temperate areas of western Asia, Africa and Europe.

=== Range ===
Within Africa, it is found in Macaronesia, (within the Madeira Islands, Canarias), Algeria, Morocco and Tunisia. It is found in the Asian countries of Cyprus, Israel, Lebanon, Syria and western Turkey. Within Europe, it is found in south west England, Greece (including Crete), Italy (including the isles of Sardinia and Sicily), France (including the island of Corsica), Spain (including the Balearic Islands) and Portugal.

It has naturalized in the Azores.

=== Habitat ===
It is found growing on free draining sandy soils that make up coastal cliffs slopes, and coastal grasslands. It can grow on sandy grounds near the sea, including on golf courses, such as Dawlish Warren course in Devon, which is classified as a Site of Special Scientific Interest (SSSI).

== Cultivation ==
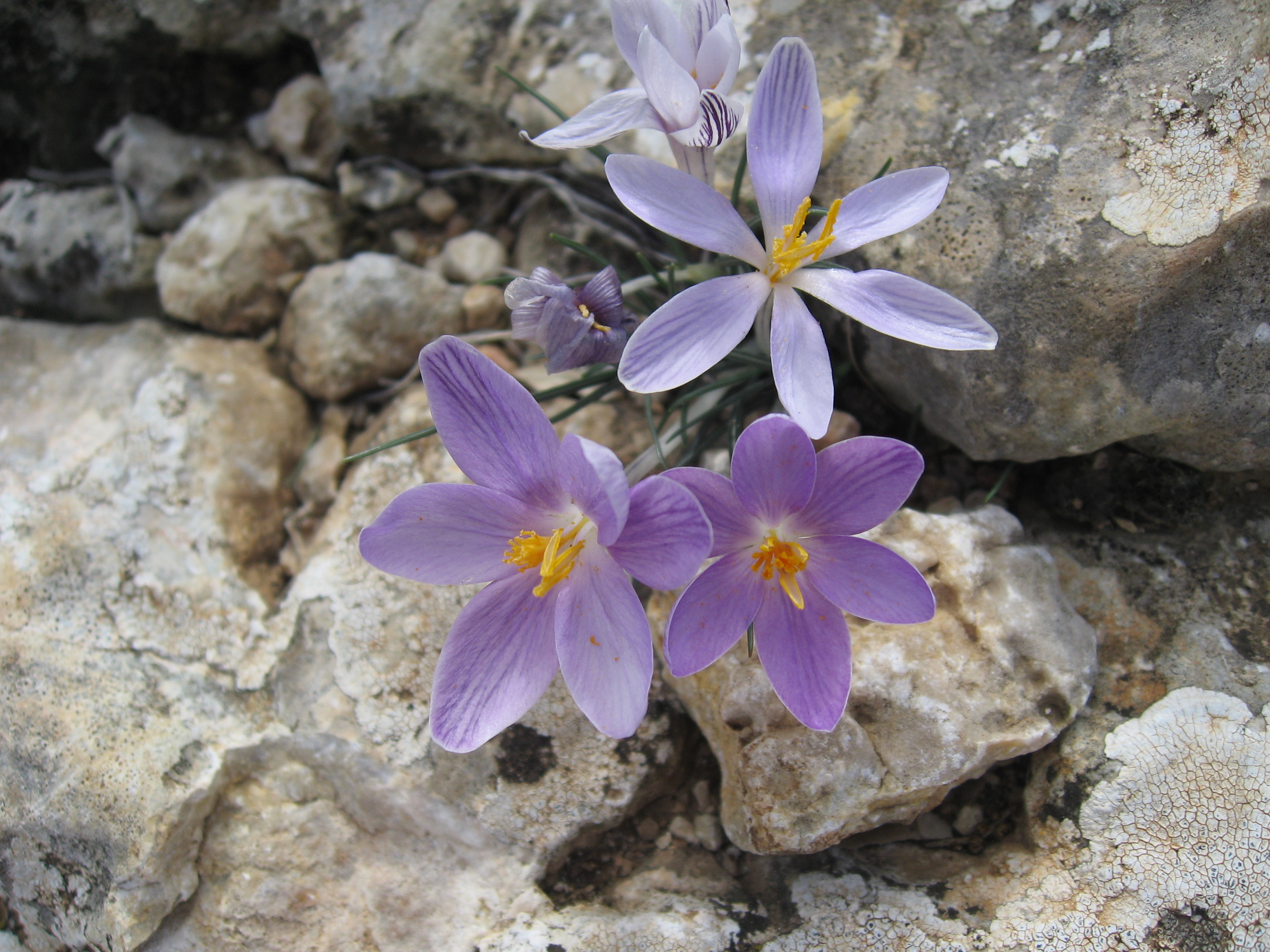
Romulea columnae on Mallorca

In temperate gardens, it is best to grow the plant inside a temperature controlled Alpine house. It can be grown in containers filled with well-drained, loam-based compost. The plant is allowed to dry in summer after the flowers have faded and the leaves become yellow.

== Other sources ==
- Botanical Society of the British Isles. BSBI taxon database (on-line resource).
- Davis, P. H., ed. 1965-1988. Flora of Turkey and the east Aegean islands.
- Hansen, A. & P. Sunding. 1993. Flora of Macaronesia: checklist of vascular plants, ed. 4. Sommerfeltia vol. 17.
- Izquierdo Z., I. et al., eds. 2004. Lista de especies silvestres de Canarias: hongos, plantas y animales terrestres
- Jahandiez, E. & R. Maire. 1931-1941. Catalogue des plantes du Maroc.
- Meikle, R. D. 1977-1985. Flora of Cyprus.
- Mouterde, P. 1966-. Nouvelle flore du Liban et de la Syrie.
- Silva, L. et al. 2005. Listagem da fauna e flora terrestres dos Açores. Lista des plantas vasculares (Pteridophyta e Spermatophyta).
- Tutin, T. G. et al., eds. 1964-1980. Flora europaea.
- Zohary, M. & N. Feinbrun-Dothan. 1966-. Flora palaestina.
