= Kremeriella =

Scientific classification
- Kingdom: Plantae
- Clade: Tracheophytes
- Clade: Angiosperms
- Clade: Eudicots
- Clade: Rosids
- Order: Brassicales
- Family: Brassicaceae
- Genus: Kremeriella; Maire
- Species: K. cordylocarpus

Binomial name
- Kremeriella cordylocarpus (Coss. & Durieu) Maire

Synonyms
- Kremeria Coss. & Durieu; Kremeria cordylocarpus Coss. & Durieu; Muricaria corydylocarpa (Coss. & Durieu) Müll.Berol.; Rapistrum cordylocarpus (Coss. & Durieu) Pomel

Species of flowering plant

Kremeriella is a monotypic genus of flowering plants belonging to the family Brassicaceae. It has one known synonym Kremeria Coss. & Durieu. It only contains one species, Kremeriella cordylocarpus (Coss. & Durieu) Maire.

Its native range is north-western Africa. It is found in Algeria and Morocco.

The genus name of Kremeriella is in honour of Jean Pierre Kremer (1812–1867), a French doctor and botanist from Metz. The Latin specific epithet of cordylocarpus is derived from 2 words, cordylo an Ancient Greek word for a club (kordyle), and also "carpus" is derived from the Latin carpus and the Greek καρπός (karpós), meaning "wrist". Both genus and species were first described and published in É.Jahandiez & al., Cat. Pl. Maroc Vol.2 on page 293 in 1932.
