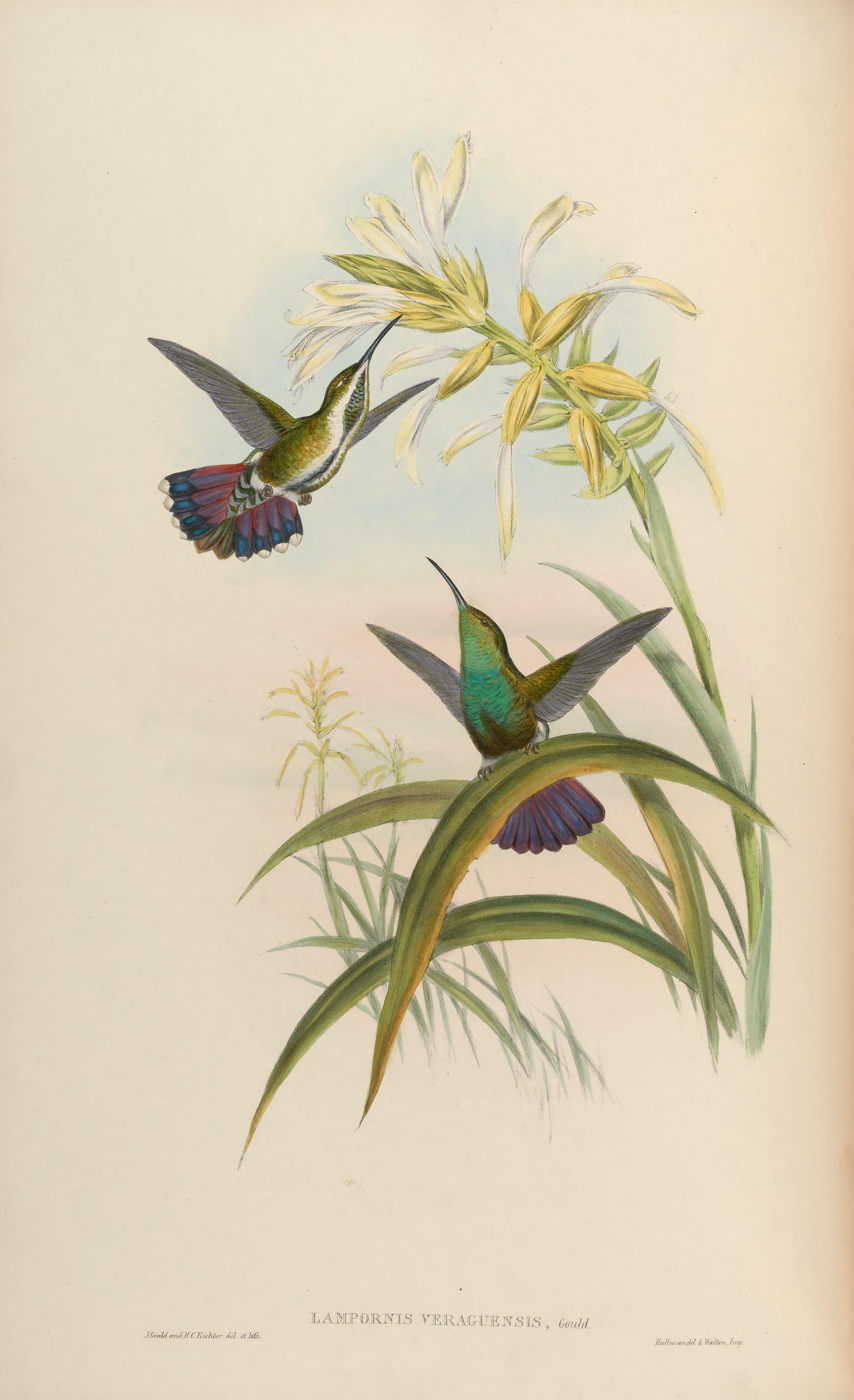
- A couple (female top-left)

Conservation status
- Least Concern (IUCN 3.1)
- CITES Appendix II

Scientific classification
- Kingdom: Animalia
- Phylum: Chordata
- Class: Aves
- Order: Apodiformes
- Family: Trochilidae
- Genus: Anthracothorax
- Species: A. veraguensis

Binomial name
- Anthracothorax veraguensis Reichenbach, 1855
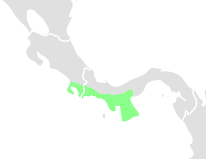
- Veraguan mango range

= Veraguan mango =

Species of bird

The Veraguan mango (Anthracothorax veraguensis) is a species of hummingbird in the family Trochilidae. It is found in Panama and recently in Costa Rica. It was considered conspecific with the Green-breasted Mango (Anthracothorax prevostii) but was separated due to morphological and geographical differences in 1995.

== Description ==
The Veraguan mango is a medium-sized hummingbird species, reaching lengths of 11–12 cm. Both sexes are metallic green with a slightly decurved, dark grey beak, and black tail feathers with a red circle central to each feather. This species exhibits sexual dimorphism. Males have a blueish breast and belly, whilst females have a white-cream belly with a dark teal stripe running down the breast. The morphology of the Veraguan mango is very similar to that of the Green-breasted mango, however it differs by the lack of black plumage on the throat. The black ventral stripe seen in the Green-breasted mango is teal coloured in female Veraguan mangos.

== Distribution and ecology ==
The species is named for the region it was first discovered in, Veraguas Province in Panama. However, it is common throughout much of the Pacific coastline of Panama and into Costa Rica. Until recently it was considered endemic to Panama, but has now been sighted in the southern Pacific lowlands of Costa Rica. In 2009 it was added to the official list of birds of Costa Rica. Like other hummingbird species, the Veraguan mango feeds on nectar and invertebrates. It has been observed feeding on the flowers of Erythrina gibbosa in Costa Rica, and other species in the genus Erythrina at other locations.

== Classification ==
Due to its similar morphology and overlapping distributions, the Veraguan mango was considered conspecific with the Green-breasted mango and was included in the species Anthracothorax prevostii. It was described as its own species, Anthracothorax veraguensis due to morphological differences such as the lack of black plumage on its underside. An analysis of the Trochilidae found that within the genus Anthracothorax, A. prevostii and A. veraguensis are indeed sister species.

== Conservation status ==
It is currently classified as Least Concern by the IUCN. Its population size and population trend are not known, but are not believed to be sufficient to raise its status to Vulnerable. It is known to occupy a restricted range of approximately 57,300 km^{2}, however this is above the criterion needed to be listed as vulnerable.

== See also ==
- Anthracothorax
- Green-breasted mango
