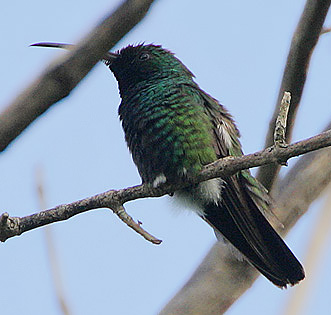

Conservation status
- Least Concern (IUCN 3.1)
- CITES Appendix II

Scientific classification
- Kingdom: Animalia
- Phylum: Chordata
- Class: Aves
- Order: Apodiformes
- Family: Trochilidae
- Genus: Anthracothorax
- Species: A. viridigula

Binomial name
- Anthracothorax viridigula (Boddaert, 1783)

= Green-throated mango =

Species of hummingbird

The green-throated mango (Anthracothorax viridigula) is a species of hummingbird in the subfamily Polytminae. It is found in Brazil, the Guianas, Trinidad, and Venezuela.

== Taxonomy and systematics ==
The green-throated mango was described by the French polymath Georges-Louis Leclerc, Comte de Buffon in 1780 in his Histoire Naturelle des Oiseaux from a specimen collected in Cayenne, French Guiana. The bird was also illustrated in a hand-colored plate engraved by François-Nicolas Martinet in the Planches Enluminées D'Histoire Naturelle which was produced under the supervision of Edme-Louis Daubenton to accompany Buffon's text. Neither the plate caption nor Buffon's description included a scientific name but in 1783 the Dutch naturalist Pieter Boddaert coined the binomial name Trochilus viridigula in his catalogue of the Planches Enluminées. The green-throated mango is now placed in the genus Anthracothorax that was introduced by the German zoologist Friedrich Boie in 1831. The species is monotypic.

The generic name combines the Ancient Greek anthrax meaning "coal" (i.e. black) and thōrax meaning "chest". The specific epithet viridigula is from the Latin viridis meaning "green" and gula meaning "throat".

== Description ==
The green-throated mango is 10.5 to 12.5 cm (4.1 to 4.9 in) long. Males weigh 7.5 to 8.5 g (0.26 to 0.30 oz), and females weigh about 6.0 g (0.21 oz). The longish black bill is slightly decurved. The male has glossy bronzy-green upperparts. Its throat and underparts are green with a black central line on the breast and belly. The central tail feathers are dark brown to green, and the others are shiny purple, with the outermost ones having dark blue tips. The female green-throated mango's upperparts are also bronzy-green but with more of a reddish tinge than the male's. She has white underparts with a black central stripe. The tail is similar to the male's but with white tips on the outermost feathers. Juveniles resemble females but have chestnut underparts.

This species closely resembles the related black-throated mango. While the male green-throated mango has less extensive black coloring on the underparts, confirming the bird's identity can be challenging in the field as both species may appear entirely black. The females of the two species are nearly indistinguishable, though the green-throated mango typically exhibits more extensive coppery upperparts than its relative.

== Distribution and habitat ==
The green-throated mango is found along the coast from northeastern Venezuela through Guyana, Suriname, and French Guiana into Brazil, as far east as Maranhão and along the Amazon River inland to the Negro River. It is also present in Trinidad but not Tobago. This bird inhabits mangrove swamp, moist lowland savannas, and similar swampy areas with scattered large trees. Its elevation range is from sea level up to 500 m (1,600 ft).

== Behavior ==
=== Movement ===
The green-throated mango is sedentary in the coastal part of its range; inland it moves seasonally to follow the flowering of trees.

=== Feeding ===
The green-throated mango feeds on the nectar of tall flowering trees, where males defend feeding territories. The species is also notably insectivorous, catching small arthropod prey on the wing or by gleaning from foliage.

=== Breeding ===
Green-throated mango nests have been found year round, though in the Guianas most have been noted between January and March. Females build a cup nest on an exposed horizontal branch of a large tree, typically at least 10 m (33 ft) above ground. The clutch size is two eggs. The incubation time is 14 to 15 days with fledging usually 24 to 25 days after hatch.

=== Vocalization ===
The green-throated mango is not highly vocal. Its song has been described as a "very high, slightly descending, trill, like 'f'srrrrrrih-tjew tjuh'." It makes a "chep...chep..." call in flight or when hovering at flowers.

== Status ==
The IUCN has assessed the green-throated mango as being of Least Concern, though its population size is not known and is believed to be decreasing. It is generally locally common in the coastal zone and less so along the Amazon. It is rare in Trinidad due to habitat loss.
