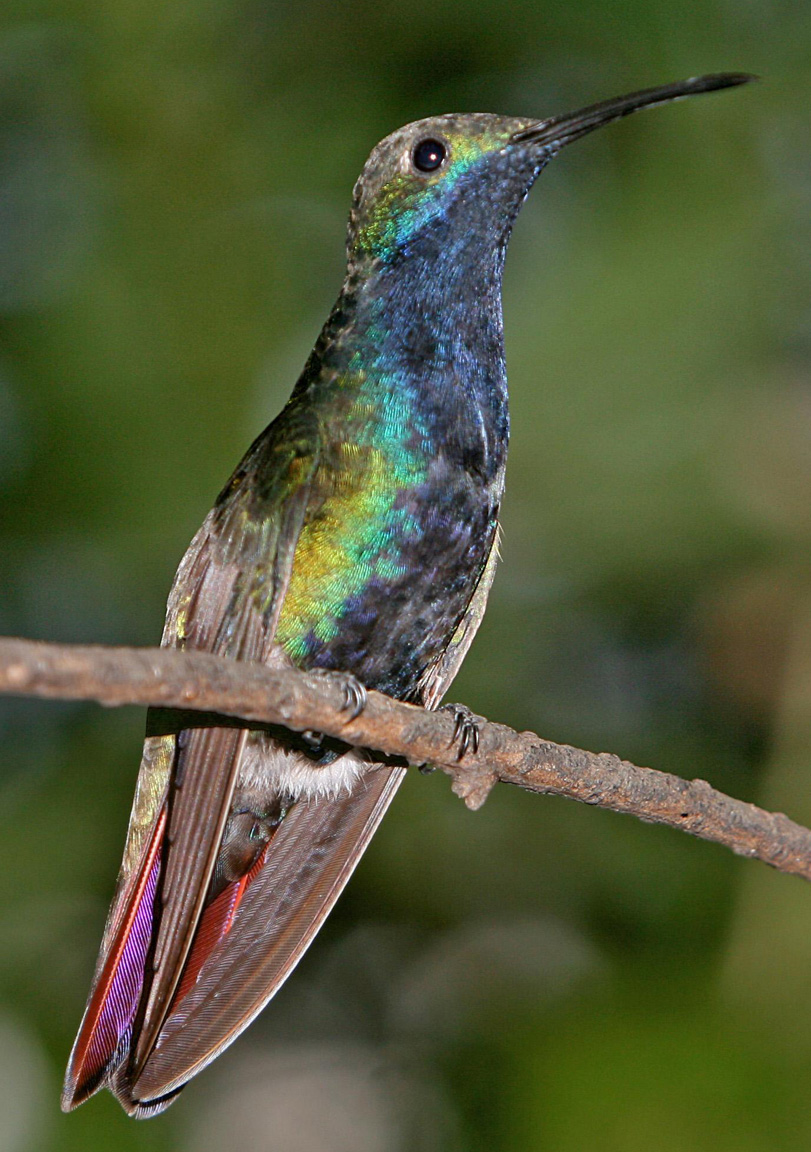
- Black-throated mango, Anthracothorax nigricollis

Scientific classification
- Kingdom: Animalia
- Phylum: Chordata
- Class: Aves
- Order: Apodiformes
- Family: Trochilidae
- Subfamily: Polytminae
- Genus: Anthracothorax; F. Boie, 1831

Type species
- Trochilus violicauda Boddaert, 1783

= Anthracothorax =

Mangos

Genus of birds

The mangos, Anthracothorax, are a non-migratory genus of hummingbirds in the subfamily Trochilinae native to the Neotropics.

The genus Anthracothorax was introduced by the German zoologist Friedrich Boie in 1831. The type species was subsequently designated as the green-throated mango (Anthracothorax viridigula). The generic name combines the Ancient Greek anthrax meaning "coal" (i.e. black) with thōrax meaning "chest".

A molecular phylogenetic study published in 2014 found that Anthracothorax was paraphyletic with respect to Eulampis.

== Species ==
The genus contains eight species:

Genus Anthracothorax – F. Boie, 1831 – eight species
Common name	Scientific name and subspecies	Range	Size and ecology	IUCN status and estimated population
Green-throated mango	Anthracothorax viridigula (Boddaert, 1783)	Venezuela, Trinidad and the Guianas south to northeastern Brazil.	Size: Habitat: Diet:	LC
Green-breasted mango	Anthracothorax prevostii (Lesson, 1832) Four subspecies: A. p. prevostii (Lesson, 1832); A. p. gracilirostris Ridgway, 1910; A. p. hendersoni (Cory, 1887); A. p. viridicordatus Cory, 1913	southern Mexico south through Central America	Size: Habitat: Diet:	LC
Black-throated mango	Anthracothorax nigricollis (Vieillot, 1817) Two subspecies: A. n. nigricollis (Vieillot, 1817); A. n. iridescens (Gould, 1861)	Panama south to northeastern Bolivia, southern Brazil and northern Argentina	Size: Habitat: Diet:	LC
Veraguan mango	Anthracothorax veraguensis Reichenbach, 1855	Panama, Costa Rica	Size: Habitat: Diet:	LC
Hispaniolan mango	Anthracothorax dominicus (Linnaeus, 1766)	Hispaniola (the Dominican Republic and Haiti)	Size: Habitat: Diet:	LC
Puerto Rican mango	Anthracothorax aurulentus (Audebert & Vieillot, 1801)	Puerto Rico, the British Virgin Islands, and the Virgin Islands, U.S.	Size: Habitat: Diet:	LC
Green mango	Anthracothorax viridis (Audebert & Vieillot, 1801)	Puerto Rico	Size: Habitat: Diet:	LC
Jamaican mango	Anthracothorax mango (Linnaeus, 1758)	Jamaica	Size: Habitat: Diet:	LC
