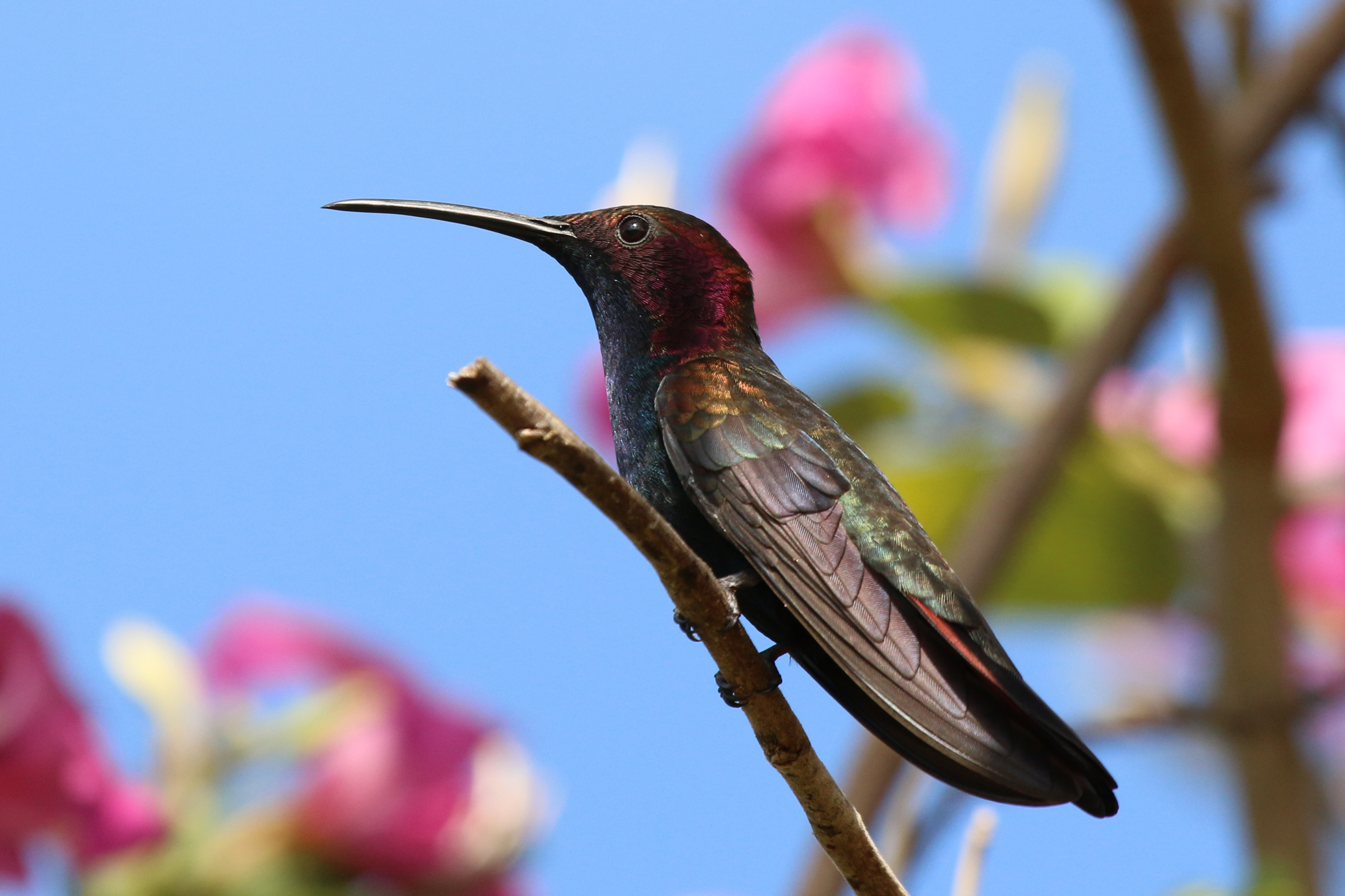
- At Green Castle Estate, Jamaica

Conservation status
- Least Concern (IUCN 3.1)
- CITES Appendix II

Scientific classification
- Kingdom: Animalia
- Phylum: Chordata
- Class: Aves
- Clade: Strisores
- Order: Apodiformes
- Family: Trochilidae
- Genus: Anthracothorax
- Species: A. mango

Binomial name
- Anthracothorax mango (Linnaeus, 1758)

Synonyms
- Trochilus mango Linnaeus, 1758

= Jamaican mango =

Species of hummingbird

The Jamaican mango (Anthracothorax mango) is a species of hummingbird in the subfamily Polytminae. It is endemic to Jamaica.

== Taxonomy ==
The Jamaican mango was formally described by the Swedish naturalist Carl Linnaeus in 1758 in the tenth edition of his Systema Naturae under the binomial name Trochilus mango. Linnaeus based his description on the "Mango bird" that had been described and illustrated in 1738 by the English naturalist Eleazar Albin. The Jamaican mango is now placed in the genus Anthracothorax that was introduced in 1831 by Friedrich Boie. The species is monotypic: No subspecies are recognized.

There is some evidence that the species is the most basal within the genus Anthracothorax.

== Description ==
The Jamaican mango is 11 to 12 cm (4.3 to 4.7 in) long and weighs 8.5 to 9.1 g (0.30 to 0.32 oz). It differs from all others of its genus by being dark overall rather than mostly bright green. The adult male's crown is dull green, the sides of the head and neck metallic magenta, and the back dull greenish bronze. The central tail feathers are dusky bronze to dull black and the rest metallic violet with a thin dark blue band. The underparts are velvety black. The adult female is similar but with faded velvety green flanks and white tips on the outer tail feathers. The immature male has a deep blue throat that becomes the adult's black after its second year.

== Distribution and habitat ==
The Jamaican mango is found throughout the eponymous island, with the densest population being along the northern coast. It inhabits a wide variety of open and semi-open landscapes including forest edges, gardens, plantations, and arid areas. It shuns mangrove areas. In elevation it mostly ranges from sea level to 800 m (2,600 ft) and is regular but rare as high as 1,500 m (4,900 ft).

== Behavior ==
=== Movement ===
The Jamaican mango moves from the higher elevations to mid levels in June to August after the upper flowering season ends.

=== Feeding ===
The Jamaican mango feeds on both nectar and arthropods. It takes nectar from a large variety of flowering trees, shrubs, and vines, both native and introduced. Males defend flowering trees. Insects are mostly taken on the wing.

=== Breeding ===
The Jamaican mango nests at any time of the year, though most frequently between January and May. It weaves a small cup nest of soft plant fibers and seed down with spider silk on a thick tree branch, typically between 3 and 8 m (9.8 and 26 ft) above the ground. The clutch size is two eggs. The incubation period and time to fledging are not known.

=== Vocalization ===
The Jamaican mango is not highly vocal and its song has not been described. Its call is "a sharp, raspy 'tic...tic...tic'."

== Status ==
The IUCN has assessed the Jamaican mango as being of Least Concern, though its population size and trend are not known. It is a common resident throughout the island. "Ready occupation of man-made habitats suggests that habitat loss is unlikely to be a problem."
