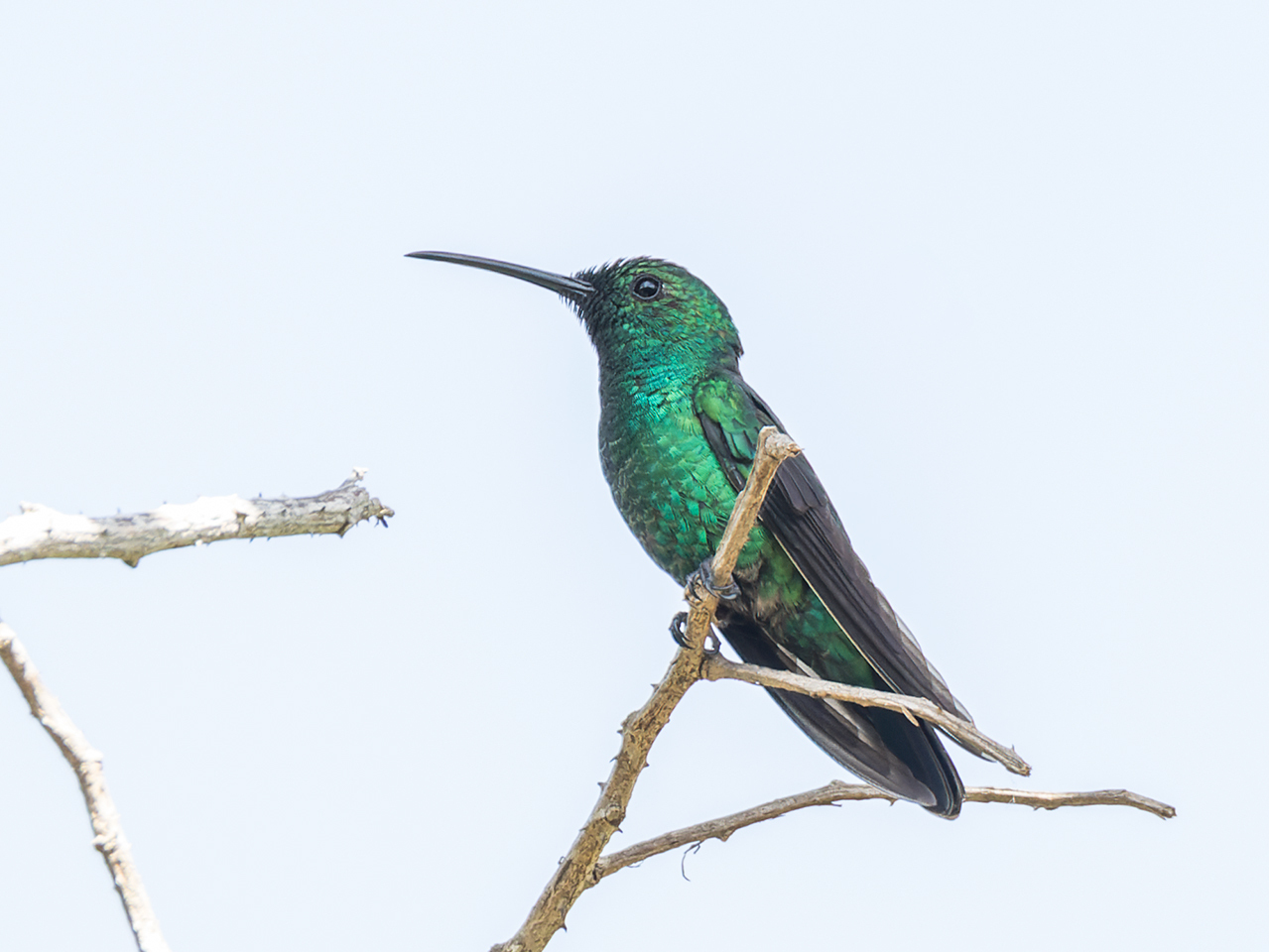

Conservation status
- Least Concern (IUCN 3.1)
- CITES Appendix II

Scientific classification
- Kingdom: Animalia
- Phylum: Chordata
- Class: Aves
- Clade: Strisores
- Order: Apodiformes
- Family: Trochilidae
- Genus: Anthracothorax
- Species: A. viridis

Binomial name
- Anthracothorax viridis (Audebert & Vieillot, 1801)

= Green mango =

Species of hummingbird

The green mango (Anthracothorax viridis), most commonly known in Spanish as zumbador verde and colibrí verde, is a large species of hummingbird in the subfamily Polytminae, endemic to the main island of Puerto Rico.

== Taxonomy and systematics ==
The green mango's relationship to the other species of genus Anthracothorax has not been settled. The species is monotypic.

== Description ==
The green mango is 11 to 14 cm (4.3 to 5.5 in) long and weighs about 7 g (0.25 oz). The sexes are alike except that the female has a tiny white spot behind the eye. Adults' upperparts are emerald green, their underparts metallic blue-green, and their tail metallic blue-black with white tips to its feathers. Immatures have a brownish tinge to the head and back.

== Distribution and habitat ==
The green mango is found only on Puerto Rico. It primarily inhabits forests and plantations in the central and western mountains and is most common between 800 and 1,200 m (2,600 and 3,900 ft) of elevation. It is rare in coastal areas.

== Behavior ==
=== Movement ===
The green mango makes altitudinal movements in response to seasonal changes in the timing of flowering.

=== Feeding ===
The green mango feeds on both nectar and arthropods. It takes nectar from a wide variety of flowering trees, shrubs, and vines, and males defend flowering trees. Insects are mostly taken on the wing and spiders from leaves and bark. It forages from the low understory to above tree-top level.

=== Breeding ===
The green mango's nesting season spans from October to May. It makes a cup nest of soft plant fiber with lichen on the outside. It is attached to a vertical branch, usually at least 8 m (26 ft) above the ground. The clutch size is two eggs. The incubation period and time to fledging are not known.

=== Vocalization ===
The green mango is not highly vocal. It does have a song, "a repeated high-pitched phrase commencing with a drawn-out buzz, 'szzzzz-szi-szi-chup-tsz-tsz.....'." Its calls include "a repeated short 'tsik' and a high-pitched twittering trill." It makes harsh rattles and chatters during agonistic encounters.

== Status ==
The IUCN has assessed the green mango as being of Least Concern, though its population size and trend are not known. It is considered common in the mountains and "readily accepts man-made habitats" such as coffee platations.

== See also ==
- Fauna of Puerto Rico
- List of birds of Puerto Rico
- List of endemic fauna of Puerto Rico
- List of birds of Vieques
- El Toro Wilderness
- Mango Green typically refers to unripe or partially ripe mangoes that are still green in color.
