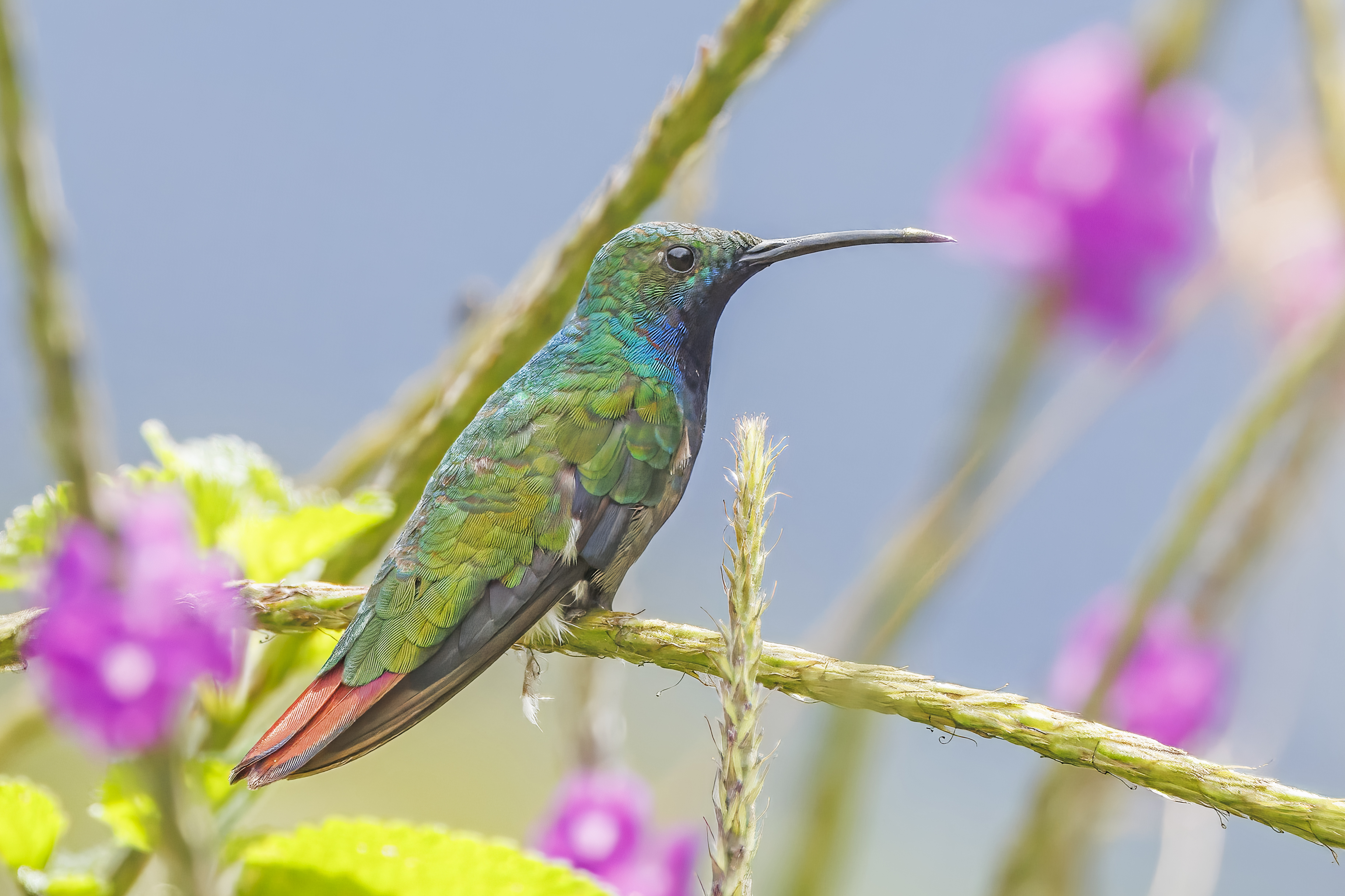
- Male, Ecuador
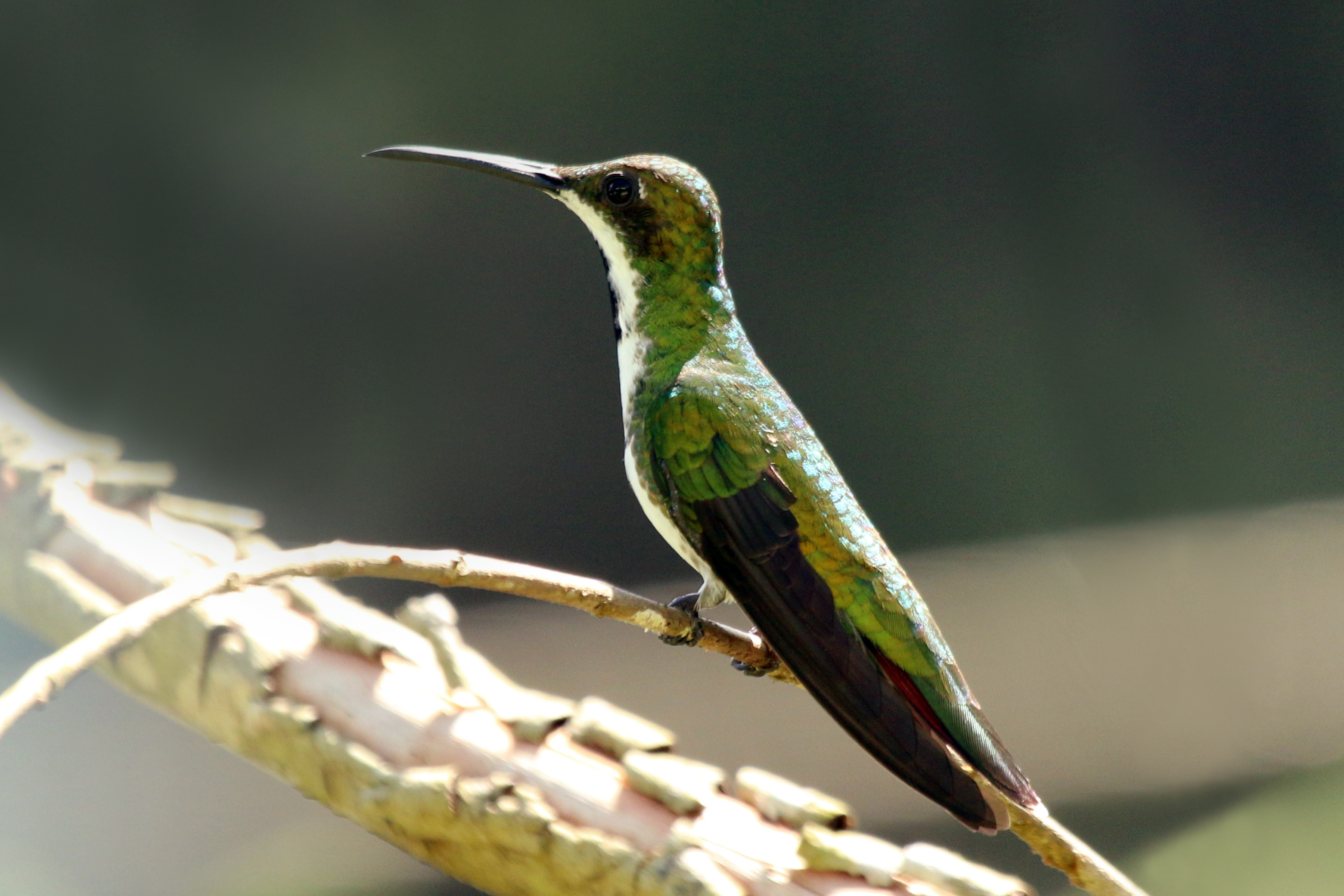
- Female in Tobago

Conservation status
- Least Concern (IUCN 3.1)
- CITES Appendix II (CITES)

Scientific classification
- Kingdom: Animalia
- Phylum: Chordata
- Class: Aves
- Clade: Strisores
- Order: Apodiformes
- Family: Trochilidae
- Genus: Anthracothorax
- Species: A. nigricollis

Binomial name
- Anthracothorax nigricollis (Vieillot, 1817)

= Black-throated mango =

Species of hummingbird

The black-throated mango (Anthracothorax nigricollis) is a species in subfamily Polytminae of the hummingbird family Trochilidae. It is found in Panama, in every mainland South American country except Chile, and in Trinidad and Tobago.

== Taxonomy and systematics ==
The black-throated mango, like many hummingbirds, bounced among several genera before settling in its present Anthracothorax. As of early 2023, worldwide taxonomic systems assign two subspecies to it, the nominate A. n. nigricollis (Vieillot, 1817) and A. n. iridescens (Gould, 1861). Subspecies A. n. iridescens had previously been assigned to the green-breasted mango (A. prevostii).

== Description ==
The black-throated mango is 10.2 to 14 cm (4.0 to 5.5 in) long and weighs 6 to 9 g (0.21 to 0.32 oz). Both sexes of both subspecies have a slightly decurved black bill. Adult males of the nominate subspecies have a metallic bronze-green crown, nape, and upperparts. Their innermost pair of tail feathers are dusky bronze green and the outer four pairs are metallic magenta-rufous with dark blue edges and a violet sheen. Their wings are grayish brown. They have a black chin, throat, and middle of the chest with metallic bluish green beside it and to the vent. Their sides and flanks are bronzy green. Nominate females have metallic green on the crown, nape, and upperparts without the male's bronzy tone. Their innermost pair of tail feathers are dusky bronze green like the male's, but the outer four pairs are rufous with a wide purple base and whitish tips. They have a thin and ragged black chin and throat stripe with a white border. The rest of their underparts are green. Juveniles are somewhat similar to adult females but have a white chin, throat, and breast with a thin black central line. Some brown on the head and back feathers gives a barred appearance. Their lower back and rump feathers have dull cinnamon-buff tips. Juvenile females have some rusty or buff beside the white of the underparts, green undertail coverts, and a mostly dull carmine underside of the tail. Within the nominate subspecies, there are some differences in the shade of the upperparts' green, spanning from pure dark green to green with a copper or bronze tone. Subspecies A. n. iridescens is essentially the same as the nominate.

== Distribution and habitat ==
The nominate subspecies of the black-throated mango is found from western Panama into much of Colombia and Venezuela, the Guianas, eastern Ecuador and Peru, northern and eastern Bolivia, eastern Paraguay, far northern Argentina, most of Brazil, and on both Trinidad and Tobago. It has also occurred as a vagrant in Uruguay. Subspecies A. n. iridescens is found in extreme southwestern Colombia, western Ecuador, and extreme northwestern Peru.

The black-throated mango inhabits a variety of landscapes in the lowland tropics, most of them semi-open to open. These include gallery forests, shade coffee, and cacao plantations, the edges of dense forest, and parks and gardens in populated areas. In general, it is a bird of the lowlands but reaches 1,400 m (4,600 ft) in Venezuela, 1,700 m (5,600 ft) in Colombia, and 2,000 m (6,600 ft) in eastern Brazil.

== Behavior ==
=== Movement ===
The black-throated mango is generally sedentary though some populations apparently make some movements seasonally or in response to the availability of flowering plants. The eastern Brazilian population is reported to make a long-distance migration. Details of the various movements have not been defined.

=== Feeding ===
The black-throated mango feeds on nectar, favoring the flowers of tall trees. Those of genera Erythrina, Eucalyptus, Mabea, Spirotheca, Tabebuia, and Spathodea are known sources. It also feeds on vines and shrubs of many genera, both native and introduced. Males defend feeding territories in trees but not as vigorously as some other hummingbirds. In addition to nectar, the species feeds on insects by hawking, mostly from a high perch but also much less frequently low down such as along roads or streams. It also gleans insects from foliage but less commonly than taking them by hawking.

=== Breeding ===
The black-throated mango's breeding season varies across its range. It nests from December to July in Trinidad, between January and April in coastal Venezuela, in July and August in Amazonian Brazil, November to February in other parts of that country, and perhaps year-round in Colombia. The female builds a cup nest of soft plant material such as seed down and rootlets with lichen on the outside, all bound together with spider silk. Most are placed like a saddle in an exposed place such as leafless parts of trees and human-made substrates such as utility wires. The clutch size is two eggs. The incubation period is 16 to 18 days, fledging occurs 20 to 26 days after hatch, and young are independent about two weeks after fledging. The female alone incubates the eggs and provisions the nestlings.

A black-throated mango nest in Cuyabeno Faunistic Reserve, Ecuador was in a tree inhabited by Pseudomyrmex stinging ants. It is likely that the ants would deter predators, but it is not known whether the birds deliberately select such trees for nesting.

=== Vocalization ===
The black-throated mango is not highly vocal. Males sing from trees, "rendered hsl-hsl-hsl-hsl-hsl-hsl-hsl". Its calls include twick or tiuck and a tsick.

== Gallery ==
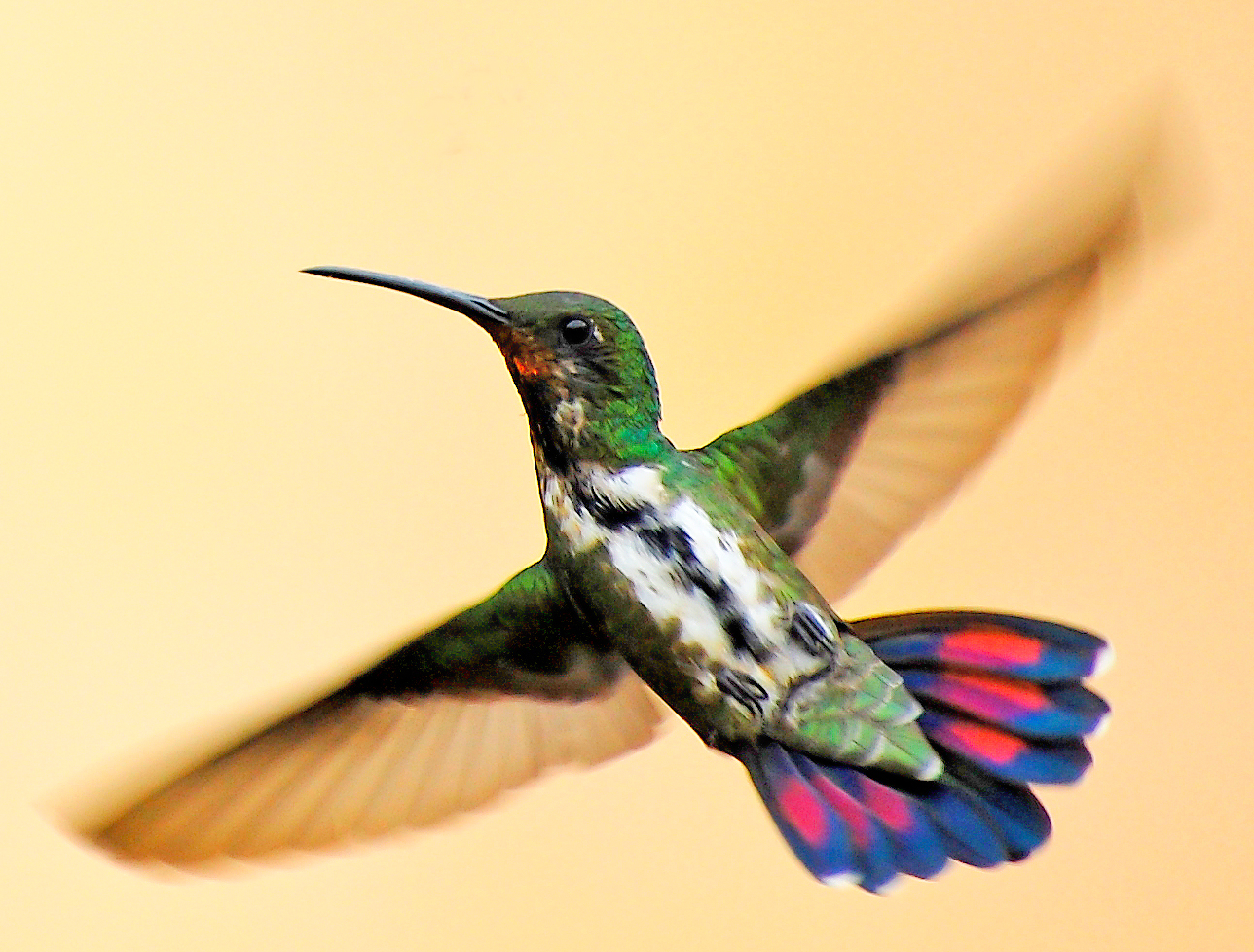
Female, Brazil

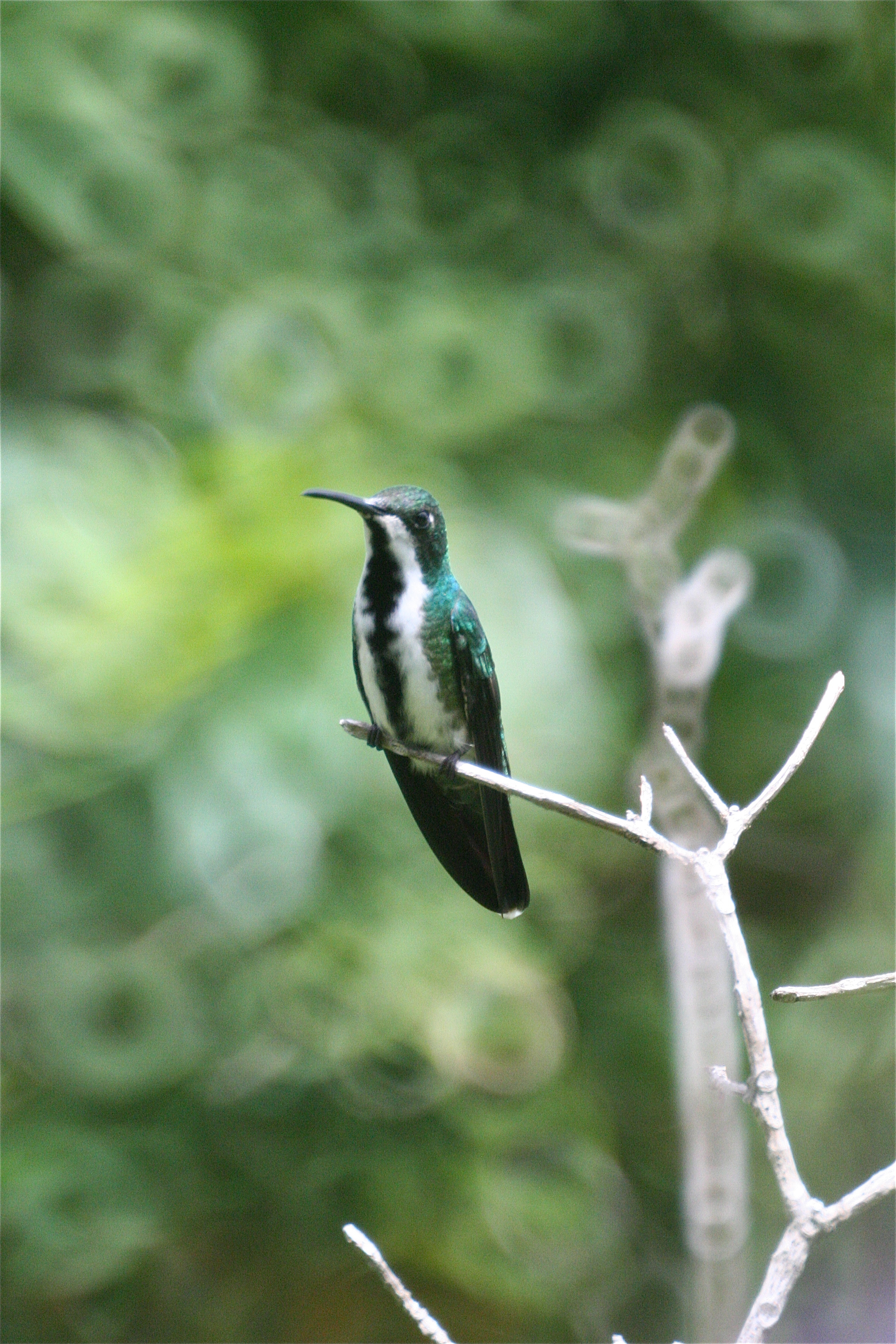
Female

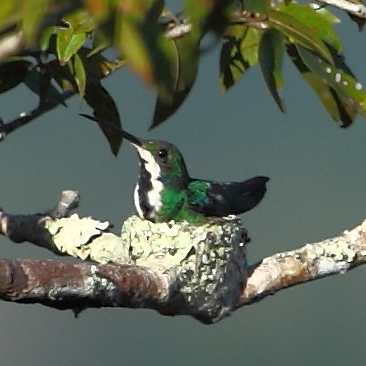
Female on nest at Novo Mundo, Mato Grosso State, Brazil
