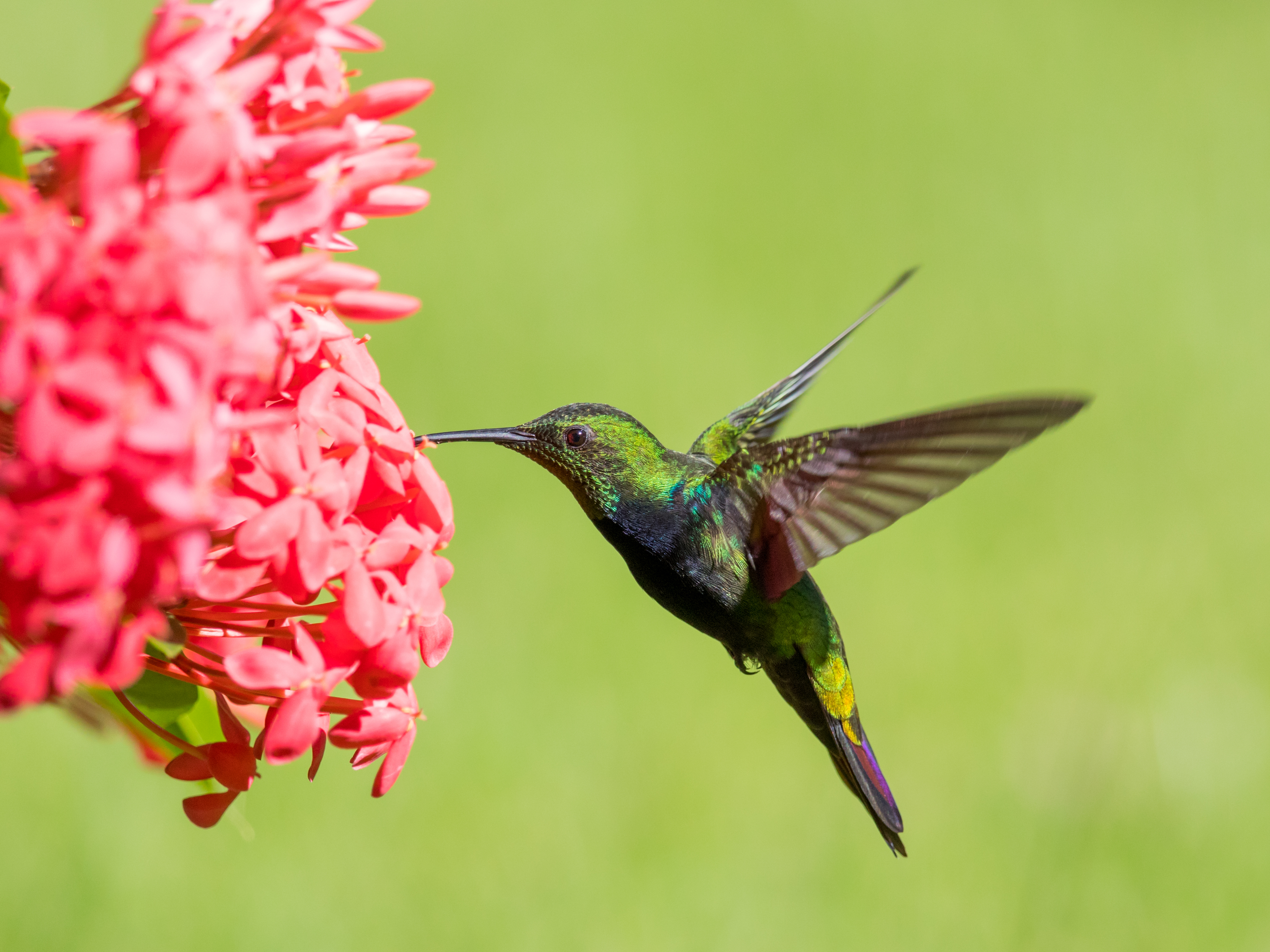

Conservation status
- Least Concern (IUCN 3.1)
- CITES Appendix II

Scientific classification
- Kingdom: Animalia
- Phylum: Chordata
- Class: Aves
- Clade: Strisores
- Order: Apodiformes
- Family: Trochilidae
- Genus: Anthracothorax
- Species: A. dominicus

Binomial name
- Anthracothorax dominicus (Linnaeus, 1766)

Synonyms
- Trochilus dominicus Linnaeus, 1766

= Hispaniolan mango =

Species of hummingbird

The Hispaniolan mango (Anthracothorax dominicus) is a species of hummingbird in the subfamily Polytminae. It is endemic to the Caribbean island of Hispaniola (in both the Dominican Republic and Haiti).

== Taxonomy and systematics ==
The Hispaniolan mango was formally described by the Swedish naturalist Carl Linnaeus in 1766 in the twelfth edition of his Systema Naturae under the binomial name Trochilus dominicus. Linnaeus based his description on the "colibry de S. Domingue" that was described and illustrated by the French zoologist Mathurin Jacques Brisson in 1760. The type locality is in the Dominican Republic on the island of Hispaniola (and not the island of Dominica). The Antillean mango is now placed in the genus Anthracothorax that was introduced by the German zoologist Friedrich Boie in 1831.

From about 1945, some taxonomic systems treated what are now the Hispaniolan mango and the Puerto Rican mango (Anthracothorax aurulentus) as subspecies of the "Antillean mango" under the same binomial, A. dominicus, as the current species. BirdLife International's Handbook of the Birds of the World (HBW) treated the two as separate species as early as 2003 and called A. dominicus the "Hispaniolan mango". The American Ornithological Society (AOS), the International Ornithological Committee (IOC), and the Clements taxonomy followed suit in 2022.

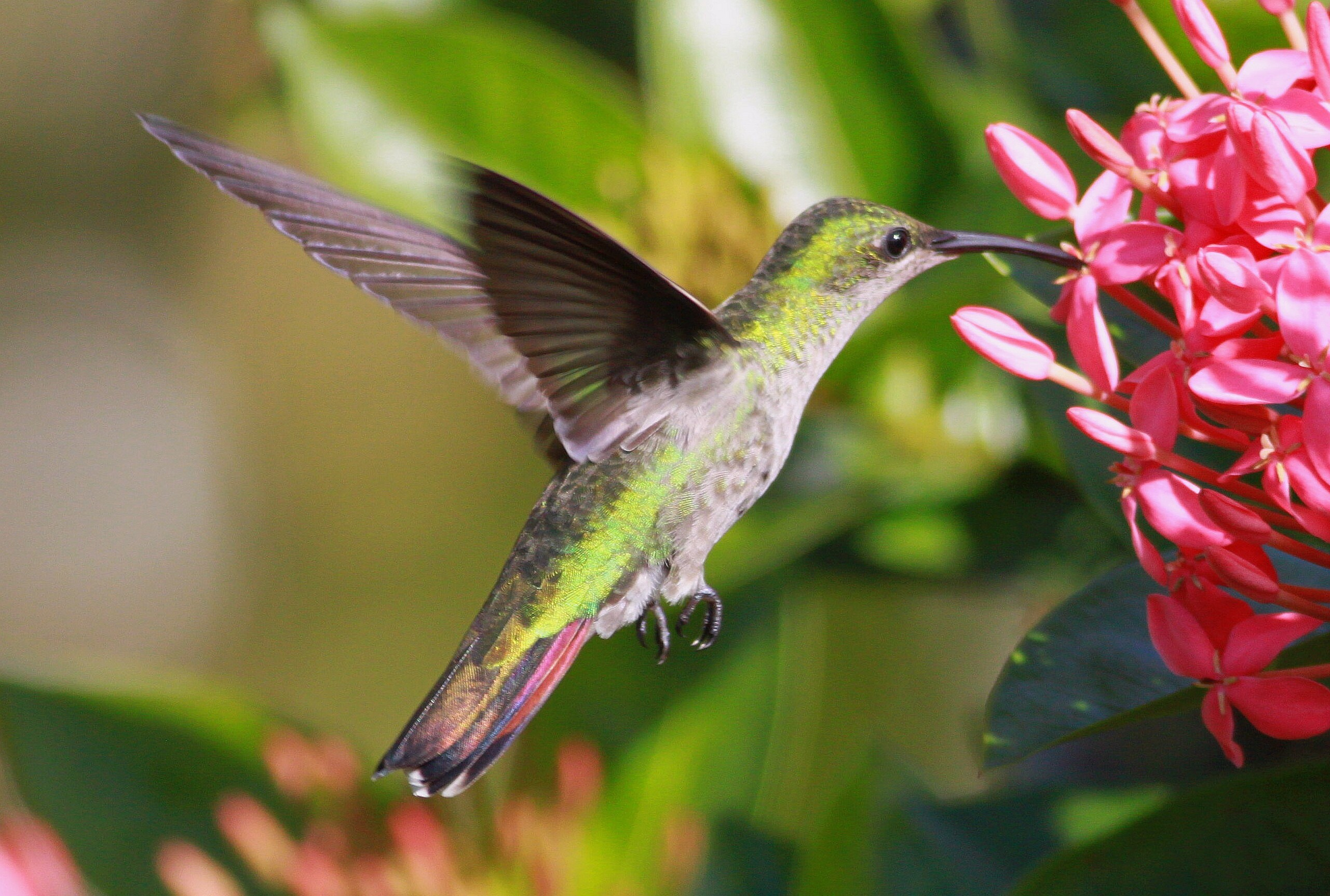
Female Antillean mango, Dominican Republic

== Description ==
Hispaniolan mangoes are 11.5 to 13.5 cm (4.5 to 5.3 in) long; males weigh 6.0 to 8.2 g (0.21 to 0.29 oz) and females 4.0 to 7.0 g (0.14 to 0.25 oz). Adult males have shiny bronze-green upperparts. The chin and throat are metallic green and the rest of the underparts velvety black with a bluish tinge. The tail is mostly violet; the inner webs of the feathers are coppery and the tips blue-black. The female's upperparts are also shiny bronze-green. Its underparts are grayish lightening to pale white on the abdomen. The tail is reddish violet with broad black marks near the end; the outermost feathers have white tips. The juvenile is thought to be like the female but with a black line down the center of the underparts.

== Distribution and habitat ==
The Hispaniolan mango is found throughout Hispaniola and several of its small offshore islands. It inhabits a variety of both moist and dry landscapes including clearings, gardens, shade coffee plantations, secondary forest, and coastal shrublands. It occurs generally below 1,500 m (4,900 ft) but is found (though rarely) as high as 2,600 m (8,500 ft).

== Behavior ==
=== Movements ===
The Hispaniolan mango is resident throughout its range.

=== Feeding ===
The Hispaniolan mango feeds on both nectar and arthropods, though details are not well known. It takes nectar from a wide variety of flowering plants and males defend nectar-rich territories. Insects are mostly taken on the wing and spiders from leaves and bark. It forages as high as 20 m (66 ft) above the ground. The species is the primary pollinator for the flowers Heliconia bihai and H. caribaea.

=== Breeding ===
The Hispaniolan mango's breeding phenology has not been studied; most information is anecdotal. It is believed to breed at any time of the year. The nest is a cup of soft plant fibers bound with spider silk and covered on the outside with lichens and bark flakes. It is usually placed in a tree or shrubs. The clutch size is two eggs.

=== Vocalization ===
The Hispaniolan mango is thought to be mostly silent, and its song has not been described. The calls include "a repeated short tsip" and "a high-pitched liquid trill".

== Status ==
The IUCN has assessed the Hispaniolan mango as being of Least Concern, though its population size and trend are not known. It generally common in coastal areas and is abundant in dry areas. It has been extirpated from some small offshore islands.
