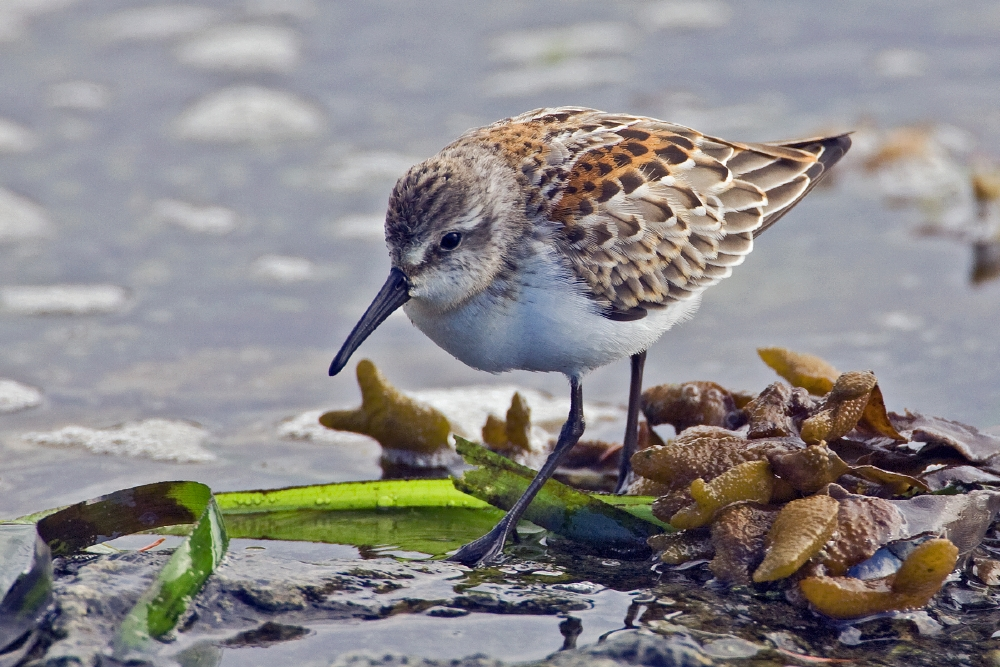

Conservation status
- Least Concern (IUCN 3.1)

Scientific classification
- Kingdom: Animalia
- Phylum: Chordata
- Class: Aves
- Order: Charadriiformes
- Family: Scolopacidae
- Genus: Calidris
- Species: C. mauri

Binomial name
- Calidris mauri (Cabanis, 1857)

Synonyms
- Ereunetes mauri Erolia mauri

Audio

= Western sandpiper =

Species of bird

The western sandpiper (Calidris mauri) is a small migratory shorebird. The genus name is from Ancient Greek kalidris or skalidris, a term used by Aristotle for some grey-coloured waterside birds. The specific mauri commemorates Italian botanist Ernesto Mauri (1791–1836).

This is one of the most abundant shorebird species in North America, with a population in the millions.

Within the genus Calidris the western sandpiper is most closely related to the semipalmated sandpiper (Calidris pusilla).

== Description ==
Adults have dark legs and a short, thin, dark bill, thinner at the tip. The body is brown on top and white underneath. They are reddish-brown on the crown. This bird can be difficult to distinguish from other similar tiny shorebirds, especially the semipalmated sandpiper. This is particularly the case in winter plumage, when both species are plain grey. The western sandpiper acquires winter plumage much earlier in the autumn than the semipalmated sandpiper.

Measurements:

- Length: 14–17 cm (5.5–6.7 in)
- Wingspan: 35–37 cm (14–15 in)
- Weight: 22–35 g (0.78–1.23 oz)

== Breeding ==
Their breeding habitat is tundra in eastern Siberia and Alaska. They nest on the ground usually under some vegetation. The male makes several scrapes; the female selects one and lays four eggs. Both parents incubate and care for dependent young, who feed themselves. Sometimes the female deserts her mate and brood prior to offspring fledging.

== Migration ==
They migrate to both coasts of North America and South America, as well as the Caribbean. It is a very rare vagrant to western Europe.

== Diet ==
These birds forage on mudflats during migration and the non-breeding season by probing or picking up food by sight. Foraging occurs on tundra and wet meadows during the breeding season. They had been thought to mainly eat insects, spiders, small crustaceans, mollusks, polychaete worms, and seeds, but are now known to heavily graze on biofilm from the surface of intertidal mudflats.
