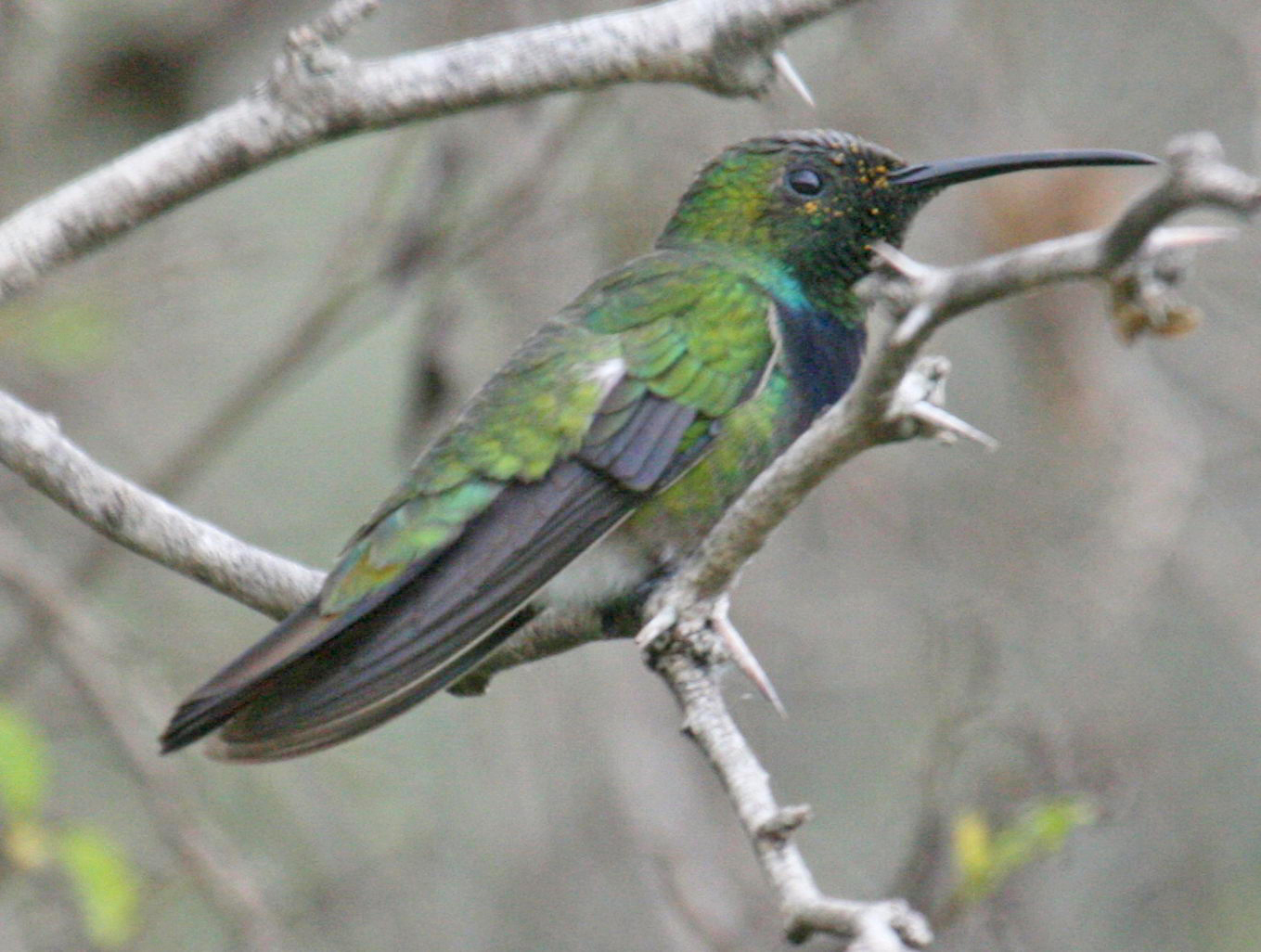

Conservation status
- Least Concern (IUCN 3.1)
- CITES Appendix II (CITES)

Scientific classification
- Kingdom: Animalia
- Phylum: Chordata
- Class: Aves
- Clade: Strisores
- Order: Apodiformes
- Family: Trochilidae
- Genus: Anthracothorax
- Species: A. prevostii

Binomial name
- Anthracothorax prevostii (Lesson, 1832)

= Green-breasted mango =

Species of hummingbird

The green-breasted mango or Prevost's mango (Anthracothorax prevostii) is a species in subfamily Polytminae of the hummingbird family Trochilidae. It is found from eastern Mexico south through most of Central America, in Colombia and Venezuela, and as a vagrant in the United States.

== Taxonomy and systematics ==
The green-breasted mango was originally described as Anthracothorax prevostii, was later placed in genera Polytmus and Lampornis, and in 1854 was returned to genus Anthracothorax. As of early 2023, worldwide taxonomic systems assign these four subspecies to it:

- A. p. prevostii (Lesson, 1832)
- A. p. gracilirostris Ridgway, 1910
- A. p. hendersoni (Cory, 1887)
- A. p. viridicordatus Cory, 1913

A fifth subspecies previous assigned to the green-breasted mango, iridescens, is now a subspecies of the black-throated mango (A. nigricollis).

The specific epithet commemorates the French naturalist Florent Prévost.

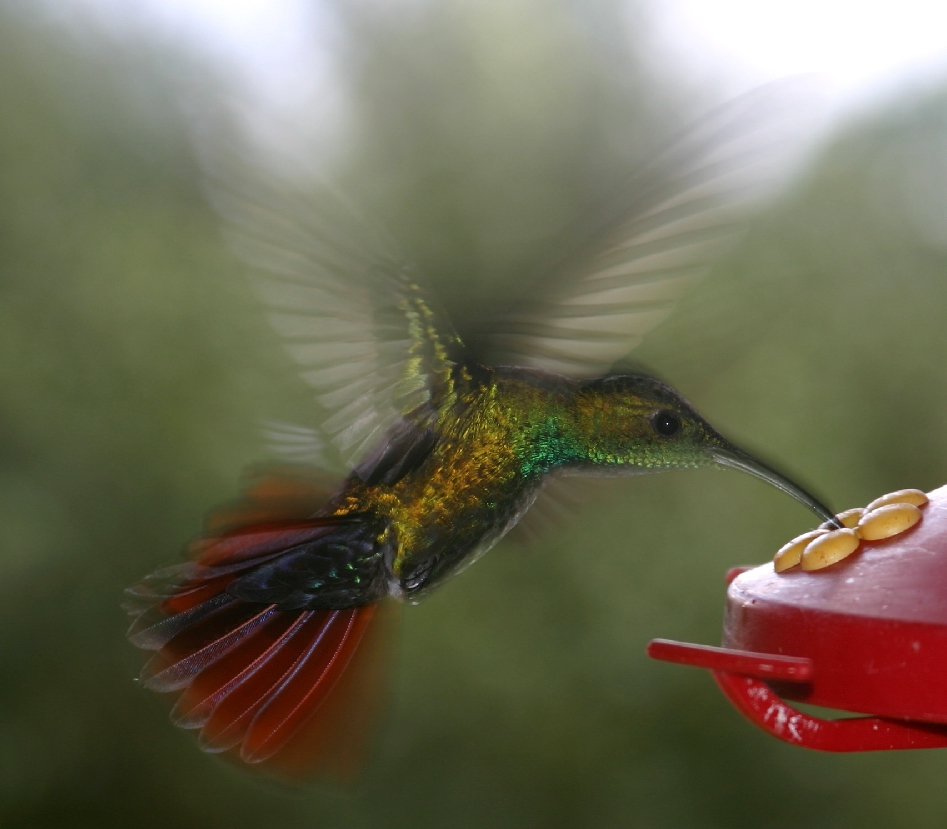
Male, Rancho Naturalista, Costa Rica (flash photo)

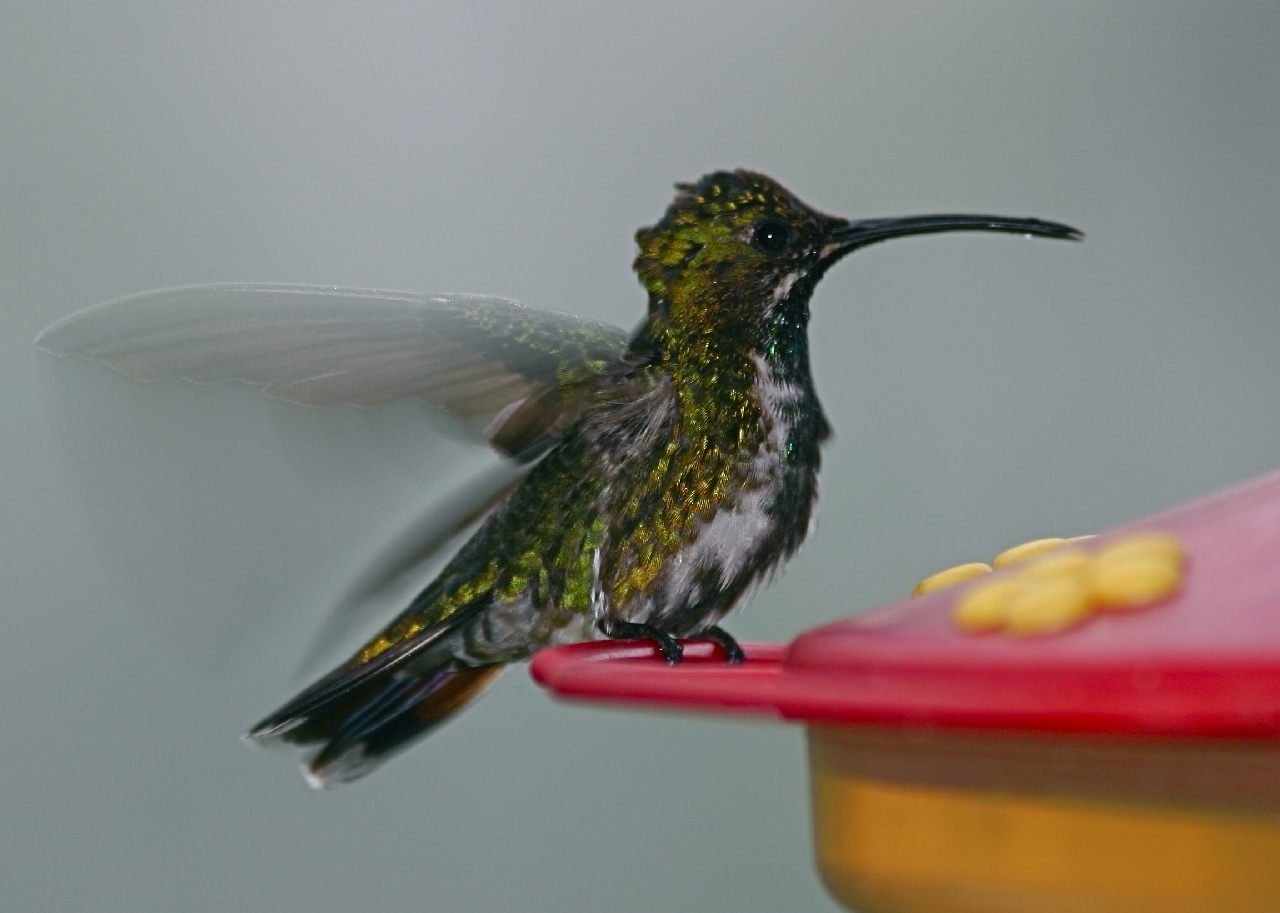
Female, Rancho Naturalista, Costa Rica (flash photo)

== Description ==
The green-breasted mango is 10.3 to 12.1 cm (4.1 to 4.8 in) long and weighs 5.7 to 7.0 g (0.20 to 0.25 oz). Both sexes of all subspecies have a slightly decurved dull black bill. Adult males of the nominate subspecies A. p. prevostii have metallic bronze green crown, nape, and upperparts. Their innermost pair of tail feathers are dull dusky bronze green to dull coppery bronze, and the outer four pairs are shades of purple with a metallic gloss. Their wings are dusky brownish slate. They have a velvety black stripe down their chin, throat, and chest with metallic bluish green beside it. Their sides and flanks are bronze green and their undertail coverts are dusky purple. Nominate females have less bronzy metallic green on the crown, nape, and upperparts than males. Their innermost pair of tail feathers are dull dusky bronze green to dull coppery bronze like the male's, but the outer four pairs are blue-black with a wide purple base and whitish tips. They have the same velvety black chin and throat stripe as males but it becomes bluish green on the breast, dusky on the belly, and has a white border. The rest of their underparts are metallic green but for dusky undertail coverts with wide white edges. Juveniles are similar to adult females but have a white chin, throat, and center of the breast with some chestnut beside it.

Subspecies A. p. gracilirostris has a shorter and thinner bill than the nominate. Its upperparts and sides are less bronzy, its underside stripe is wider and bluish black, and its undertail coverts are darker. A. p. hendersoni also has a shorter bill than the nominate. It has an ashy tinge on the crown and a longer and thinner bluish black stripe. A. p. viridicordatus has bright grass green upperparts, olive green central tail feathers, and darker undertail coverts than the nominate.

== Distribution and habitat ==
The subspecies of green-breasted mango are found thus:

- A. p. prevostii, from San Luis Potosí and southern Tamaulipas in Mexico south to Guatemala, Belize, and El Salvador
- A. p. gracilirostris, from El Salvador south through Honduras, Nicaragua, and Costa Rica into northwestern Panama's Bocas del Toro Province
- A. p. hendersoni, Providencia and San Andrés islands off the coast of Nicaragua (but belonging to Colombia)
- A. p. viridicordatus, extreme northeastern Colombia and coastal Venezuela from the Guajira Peninsula to Sucre state

Many individuals of the nominate subspecies have wandered to the United States. Since 1988 there have been at least 25 records in Texas. Single birds have strayed to Cabarrus County, North Carolina in 2000; Rock County, Wisconsin in 2007, Laurens County, Georgia in 2007 into 2008; and Caddo Parish, Louisiana in 2009.

The green-breasted mango inhabits a variety of landscapes in the lowland tropics, most of them semi-open to open. These include shrublands with trees, savanna, secondary forest, gallery forest, mangroves, and the edges of denser forest. It also occurs in cultivated areas, parks, gardens, and suburban and urban areas. In elevation it mainly occurs from sea level to 500 m (1,600 ft) but occurs locally as high as 1,100 m (3,600 ft) in Central America.

== Behavior ==
=== Movement ===
The population of the green-breasted mango that breeds from Oaxaca north withdraws from there between September and February, generally to the Pacific slope from southern Mexico to El Salvador. The rest of the species is essentially sedentary though some post-breeding dispersal is expected.

=== Feeding ===
The green-breasted mango forages for nectar and arthropods at all levels of its habitat, from the understory to the canopy. Its nectar sources have not been detailed but include a wide variety of flowering trees, vines, bromeliads, shrubs, and herbaceous plants; it also frequents sugar water feeders. It does not appear to favor flowers of any particular colors. It takes nectar while hovering. It takes insects and spiders by hawking from a perch and by gleaning from vegetation and spider webs.

=== Breeding ===
The green-breasted mango's breeding season varies geographically. In the northern part of the Caribbean slope it is between March and June. In El Salvador it is from October to February. Further south in Central America it appears to nest at any time of the year. The species often rears two broods in a year. The female builds a cup nest of soft plant fibers with tree bark and lichens on the outside and sometimes small feathers as a lining; all is held together with spider silk. It usually builds the nest on a bare horizontal branch as high as 30 m (100 ft) up in a tree, but nests have also been noted on human-made substrates such as wires, fences, and antennas. The clutch size is two eggs. The female alone incubates the clutch and cares for nestlings. The incubation period, time to fledging, and other details of parental care are not known.

=== Vocalization ===
The green-breasted mango is not highly vocal. Its song is "a buzzy and repetitive tsi si-si-si si-si-si" with up to 17 notes. Its calls include a "short, high, and sharp sip or sik" in flight, a "harsh chipping, chik chik chik" while feeding or perched, and a "high, shrill, slightly tinny twittering" during agonistic encounters.

== Status ==
The IUCN has assessed the green-breasted mango as being of Least Concern. It has a very large range and an estimated population of at least a half million mature individuals, though the latter is believed to be decreasing. No immediate threats have been identified. Because the species is common in human-modified landscapes like agricultural fields, parks, and residential areas, and even favors them in some places, "in the short term, this species may benefit from deforestation and the landscapes that result from anthropogenic intervention."

The green-breasted mango is protected in the U.S. under the Migratory Bird Treaty Act.
