= Ernesto Mauri =

Botanist (1791–1836)

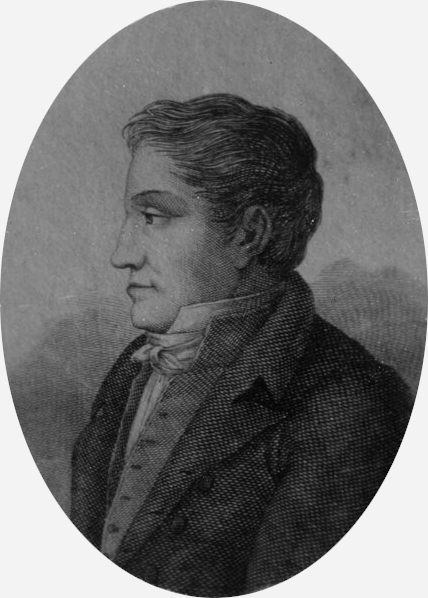

Ernesto Mauri (12 January 1791 – 13 April 1836) was an Italian botanist and mycologist. He served as a professor of botany in Rome and was director of the botanical garden there.

Mauri was born in Rome and studied medicine. He was a student of F. Antonio Sebastiani (1782-1821) and collaborated with him to produce the Florae romanae prodromus (1818). He succeeded Sebastiani as chair of botany in 1820 and worked on moving the Gianicolense botanical garden founded by G. B. Trionfetti, from the Gianicolo hill to the grounds of Villa Salviati on Via della Lungara. He published descriptions of several mushrooms and plants in Romanarum plantarum fasciculus primus et alter. The species Calidris mauri was named in his honour by Cabanis. The plants Pelargonium maurii and Orchis mauri are also named after him.
