= Émile Jahandiez =

Émile Jahandiez (born 17 March 1876 in Mortagne-au-Perche, Orne - died 20 September 1938 in Carqueiranne, Var) was a French botanist.
