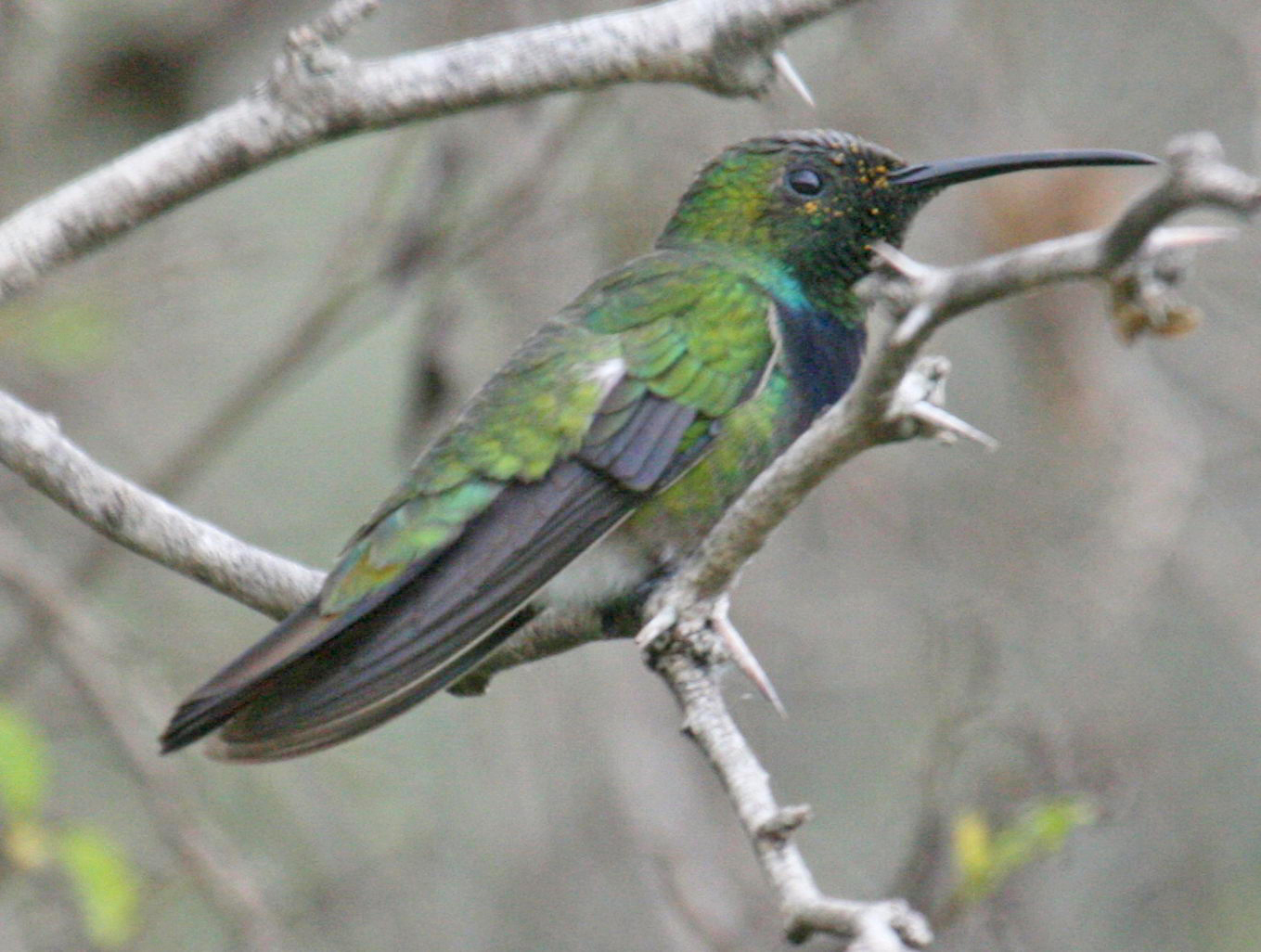

Conservation status
- Least Concern (IUCN 3.1)
- CITES Appendix II (CITES)

Scientific classification
- Kingdom: Animalia
- Phylum: Chordata
- Class: Aves
- Clade: Strisores
- Order: Apodiformes
- Family: Trochilidae
- Genus: Anthracothorax
- Species: A. aurulentus

Binomial name
- Anthracothorax aurulentus (Audebert & Vieillot, 1801)

Synonyms
- Anthracothorax dominicus aurulentus

= Puerto Rican mango =

Species of hummingbird

The Puerto Rican mango (Anthracothorax aurulentus) is a species of hummingbird in the subfamily Polytminae. It is found on the Caribbean islands of Puerto Rico, the British Virgin Islands, and the American Virgin Islands.

== Taxonomy and systematics ==
From about 1945, some taxonomic systems treated what is now the Puerto Rican mango as a subspecies of the "Antillean mango" (Anthracothorax dominicus). BirdLife International's Handbook of the Birds of the World (HBW) treated the Puerto Rican mango as a separate species as early as 2003 and called A. dominicus the Hispaniolan mango. The American Ornithological Society (AOS), the International Ornithological Committee (IOC), and the Clements taxonomy followed suit in 2022.

== Description ==
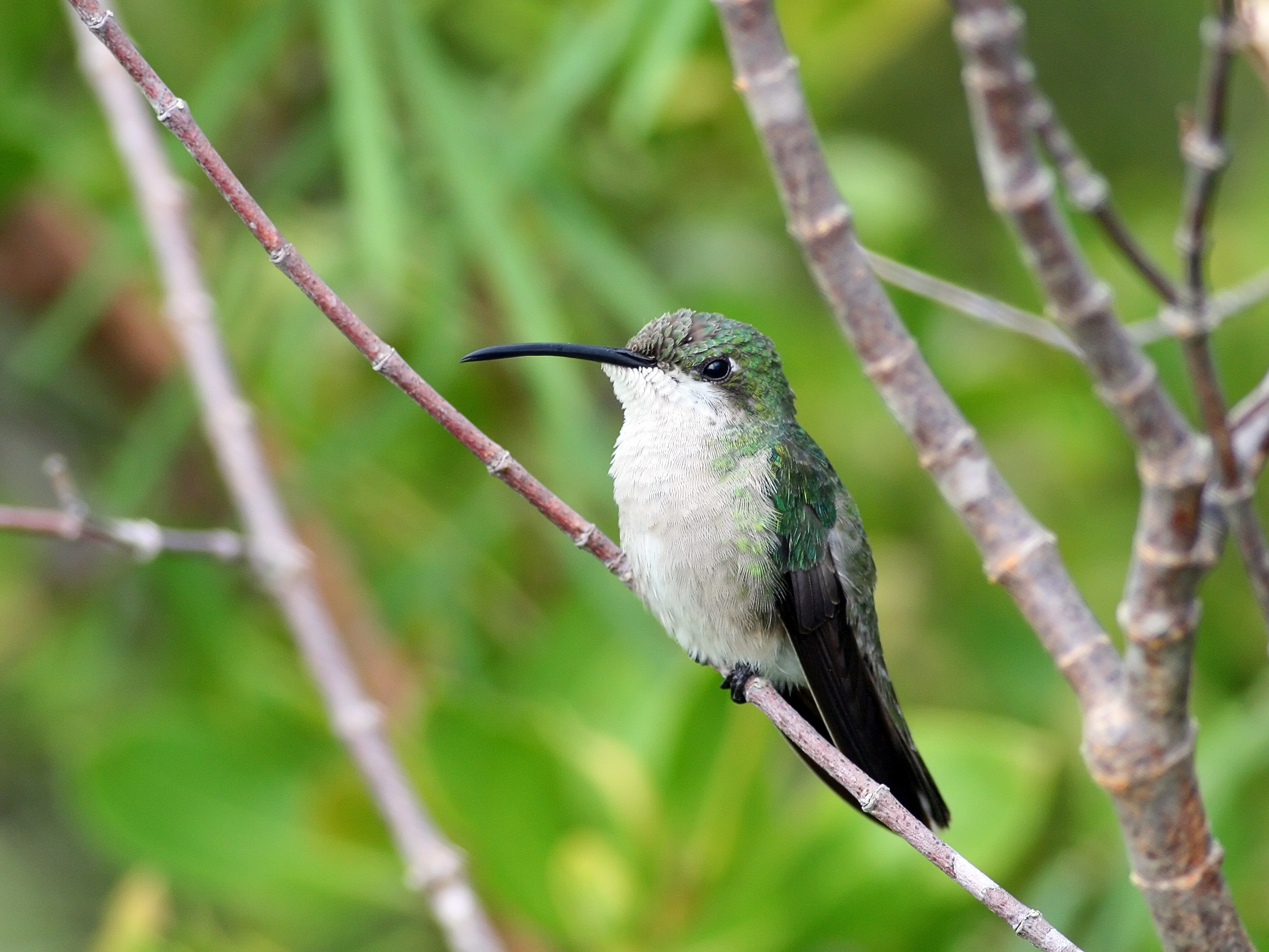
Female

The Puerto Rican mango is 11 to 12 cm (4.3 to 4.7 in) long; males weigh 4.8 to 7.2 g (0.17 to 0.25 oz) and females 4.0 to 6.4 g (0.14 to 0.23 oz). The male's upperparts are shiny bronze-green. It has green flanks, a dark brownish gray belly, and a bronzy green tail. The female's upperparts are also shiny bronze-green and its underparts are grayish lightening to pale white on the abdomen. It has a brownish gray tail with broad black marks near the end; the outermost feathers have white tips.

== Distribution and habitat ==
The Puerto Rican mango is found on Puerto Rico, its offshore island Culebra, and the British and American Virgin Islands. It is apparently extirpated from the Puerto Rican island of Vieques. It is found almost entirely in lowlands below 250 m (820 ft), where it occurs in gardens and forest edges.

== Behavior ==
=== Movements ===
The Puerto Rican mango is resident throughout its range.

=== Feeding ===
The Puerto Rican mango feeds on both nectar and arthropods, though details are not well known. It takes nectar from a wide variety of flowering plants and males defend nectar-rich territories. Insects are mostly taken on the wing and spiders from leaves and bark. It forages as high as 20 m (66 ft) above the ground.

=== Breeding ===
The Puerto Rican mango's breeding phenology has not been studied; most information is anecdotal. It is believed to breed at any time of the year and perhaps twice a year in Puerto Rico. The nest is a cup of soft plant fibers bound with spider silk and covered on the outside with lichens and bark flakes. It is usually placed in a tree or shrub and in Puerto Rico has been found on human-made substrates such as power lines, antennas, and fences. The clutch size is two eggs. The incubation time has been reported to be about 15 days with fledging 22 to 25 days after hatch.

=== Vocalization ===
The Puerto Rican mango is thought to be mostly silent, and its song has not been described. Its calls include "a repeated short tsip" and "a high-pitched liquid trill".

== Status ==
The IUCN has assessed the Puerto Rican mango as being of Least Concern, though its population is not known and is believed to be decreasing. It is considered generally common in coastal areas. It has been extirpated from some small offshore islands.
