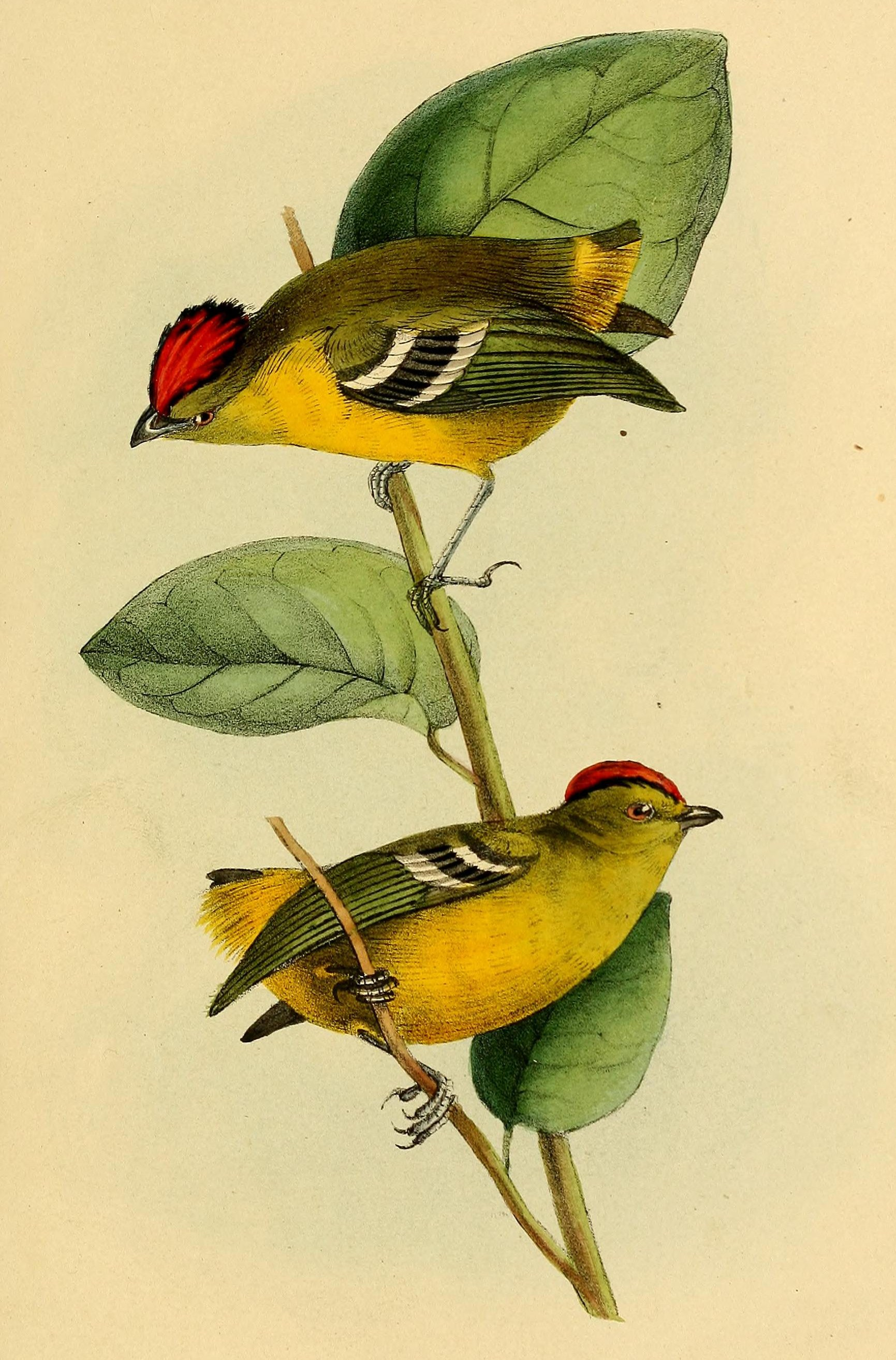
- Kinglet calyptura illustrated by William Swainson

Conservation status
- Critically Endangered (IUCN 3.1)

Scientific classification
- Kingdom: Animalia
- Phylum: Chordata
- Class: Aves
- Order: Passeriformes
- Family: Tyrannidae
- Genus: Calyptura; William Swainson, 1832
- Species: C. cristata

Binomial name
- Calyptura cristata (Vieillot, 1818)

Synonyms
- Pardalotus cristatus

= Kinglet calyptura =

Species of bird

The kinglet calyptura (Calyptura cristata) is a small Critically Endangered passerine bird in the family Tyrannidae, the tyrant flycatchers. It is endemic to southeastern Brazil.

== Taxonomy and systematics ==
The kinglet calyptura was initially described as Pardalotus cristatus by Louis Pierre Vieillot in 1818 in the Nouveau Dictionnaire d'Histoire Naturelle on the basis of a specimen collected near Rio de Janeiro. It was later placed in the genus Calyptura, whose name comes from the Ancient Greek words καλύπτω "to cover", and ούρά "tail", a reference to the kinglet calyptura's very short tail which hardly projects beyond the species' tail-coverts. The specific name cristata comes from the Latin word "cristatus" crested. Its English name references its resemblance to the kinglets of family Regulidae.

The kinglet calyptura had traditionally been placed in the family Cotingidae and was sometimes called the kinglet cotinga. Within that family it was believed to be closely related to species that were later removed from the family. Some taxonomic systems for a time classified it as incertae sedis. A study published in 2012 showed that the species belonged instead in family Tyrannidae in the same subfamily Platyrinchinae as the genera Neopipo and Platyrinchus. Between 2012 and 2016 taxonomic systems made that change.

The kinglet calyptura is monotypic.

== History ==
The kinglet calyptura was long known only from specimens collected in the nineteenth century; at least 55 are in museums. It was thought to be extinct but was rediscovered in October 1996. However, despite intensive searches as of 2020 it had not been reliably recorded since.

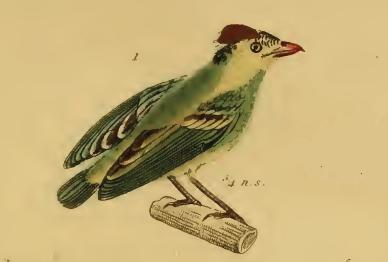
Pardalotus cristatus illustrated by Georges Cuvier

== Description ==
The kinglet calyptura is 7.5 to 8 cm (3.0 to 3.1 in) long. The sexes have almost the same plumage. Adult males have a large orange-red patch on the crown that is bordered in black on an otherwise bright olive head; females have a smaller patch. Both sexes' upperparts are mostly bright olive with a yellow rump. Their wings are dusky with white tips on the coverts and tertials; the former show as two strong wing bars. Their tail is dusky and very short. Their underparts are mostly yellow with an olive wash on the breast. Their bill is conical with an arched culmen. Though they have not been formally described the bill and legs appear to be dark.

== Distribution and habitat ==
The well-documented nineteenth century specimens of the kinglet calyptura were collected in Rio de Janeiro state in southeastern Brazil. One specimen is labeled as originating in "São Paulo" but its provenance is in doubt. There are also unconfirmed nineteenth century sight records from that state. The modern sightings in October 2016 were at the edge of Serra dos Órgãos National Park north of the city of Rio de Janeiro in the state of that name. The species inhabits the Atlantic Forest biome where it was thought to be somewhat common in humid primary forest up to an elevation of about 900 m (3,000 ft) in the nineteenth century. The 2016 sightings were in secondary forest at an elevation of about 550 m (1,800 ft).

== Behavior ==
=== Movement ===
The kinglet calyptura is believed to make seasonal elevational movements.

=== Feeding ===
The kinglet calyptura is normally found in pairs. It forages by climbing in all directions on lianas, eating insects or small berries depending on the season. It has a preference for fruits from the "Marianeira", which is the Brazilian name for two different species of shrub in the family Solanaceae, Acnistus cauliflorus and Aureliana lucida. The species has also been observed exploring the rosettes of bromeliad leaves in which dew collects.

=== Breeding ===
Nothing is known about the kinglet calyptura's breeding biology.

=== Vocalizations ===
As of early 2025 neither xeno-canto nor the Cornell Lab of Ornithology's Macaulay Library have any recordings of the kinglet calyptura. Its call has been described as brief, hoarse, and disagreeable, as well as surprisingly loud for a bird of its size.

== Status ==
The IUCN originally in 1988 assessed the kinglet calyptura as Threatened but since 1994 as Critically Endangered. It is known only from the very restricted range of about 3 km^{2} (1 sq mi) in Rio de Janeiro state, and its estimated population of between one and 50 individuals is believed to be decreasing. "Deforestation appears to have brought this species to the brink of extinction - historically driven by gold and diamond mining and the creation of coffee plantations in areas where the species was initially collected. If it is an altitudinal migrant, the lack of remaining forest below 1,000 m is likely to be a particular threat. Development within forest around the edges of the Serra dos Órgãos National Park, particularly at the site of the 1996 rediscovery, is concerning. The harvesting of bromeliads, mistletoes and orchids from the forest of the region may further threaten the species by reducing food supply, but also by altering habitat structure and microclimate. Climate change could also have an impact on the species, particularly through habitat shifting." Deforestation in Brazil has led to the displacement of as many as 93% of Atlantic Forest bird species.
