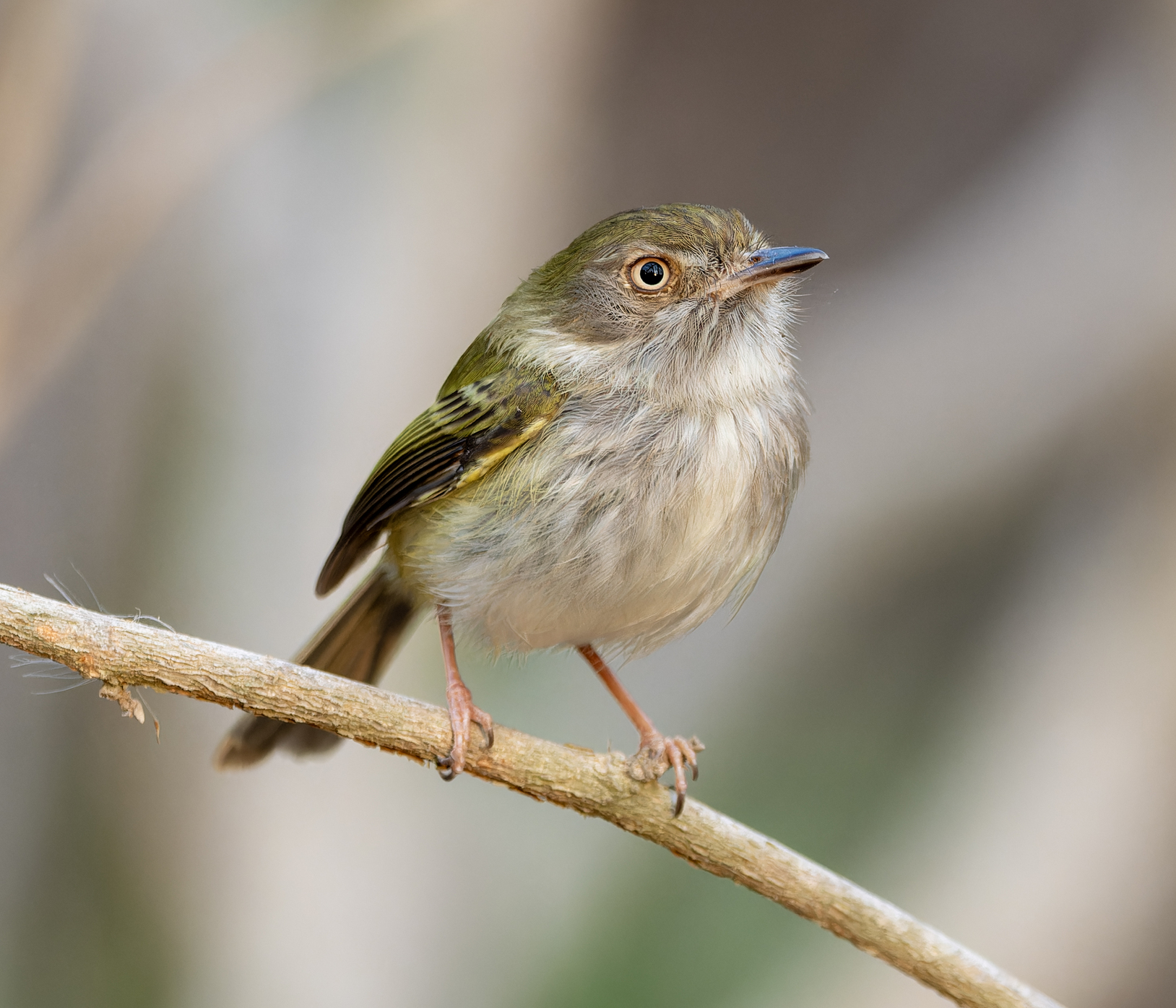

Conservation status
- Least Concern (IUCN 3.1)

Scientific classification
- Kingdom: Animalia
- Phylum: Chordata
- Class: Aves
- Order: Passeriformes
- Family: Tyrannidae
- Genus: Atalotriccus; Ridgway, 1905
- Species: A. pilaris

Binomial name
- Atalotriccus pilaris (Cabanis, 1847)

Synonyms
- Lophotriccus pilaris

= Pale-eyed pygmy tyrant =

Species of bird

The pale-eyed pygmy tyrant (Atalotriccus pilaris) is a species of bird in the tyrant flycatcher family Tyrannidae. It is found in Brazil, Colombia, Guyana, Panama, and Venezuela.

== Taxonomy and systematics ==
The pale-eyed pygmy tyrant's taxonomy is unsettled. It was originally described as Colopterus pilaris in 1847. It was later moved into genus Atalotriccus, where most taxonomic systems retain it. However, the North American Classification Committee of the American Ornithological Society follows the recommendation of Lanyon (1988) that Atalotriccus be merged into Lophotriccus. In addition, several authors have suggested that both Atalotriccus and Lophotriccus should be merged into genus Hemitriccus.

The pale-eyed pygmy tyrant is the only member of genus Atalotriccus; it has these four subspecies:

- A. p. wilcoxi Griscom, 1924
- A. p. pilaris (Cabanis, 1847)
- A. p. venezuelensis Ridgway, 1906
- A. p. griseiceps (Hellmayr, 1911)

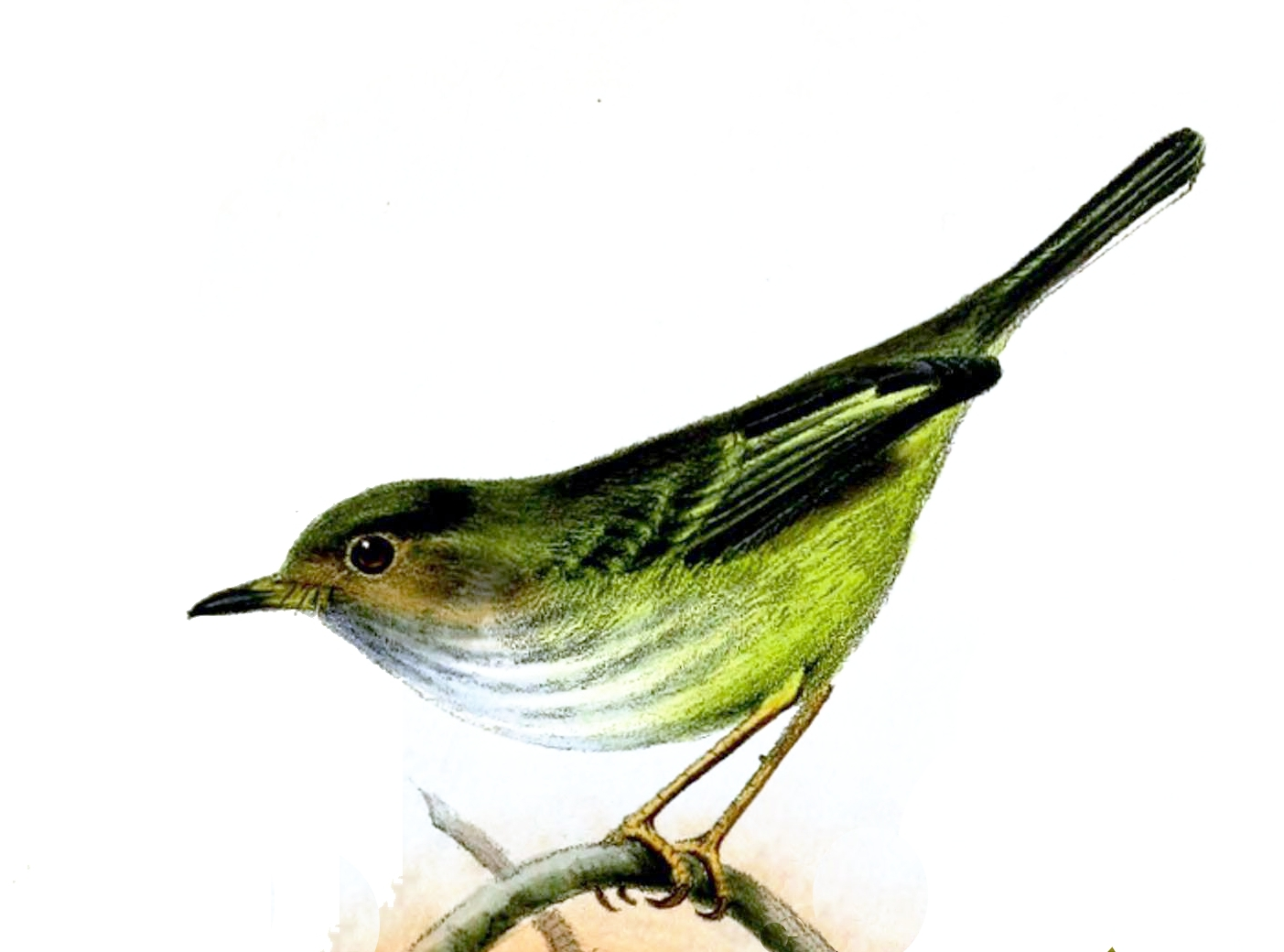
Illustration by Joseph Wolf

== Description ==
The pale-eyed pygmy tyrant is 8 to 11 cm (3.1 to 4.3 in) long and weighs about 6 g (0.21 oz). The sexes have the same plumage. Adults of the nominate subspecies A. p. pilaris have a bright olive crown and nape that are suffused with grayish. Their lores are whitish above and gray below; they have a pale partial eye-ring and gray ear coverts. Their back, rump, and uppertail coverts are bright olive. Their wings are dusky with olive-green edges on the flight feathers and lemon to pale olive tips on the coverts; the latter show as two wing bars. Their tail is dusky. Their throat and underparts are mostly whitish with diffuse dusky streaks on the throat and upper breast and a lemon tinge on the lower flanks and undertail coverts. Subspecies A. p. wilcoxi has duller green upperparts, paler yellow underparts, and less distinct wing bars than the nominate. A. p. venezuelensis has a grayer crown and brighter green upperparts than the nominate. A. p. griseiceps has a smoky gray crown and a cinnamon buff or rufous tinge to the forehead and around the eyes. All subspecies have a yellowish white iris, a dark brown to black bill that often has a pinkish base, and pale pink to pinkish orange legs and feet.

== Distribution and habitat ==
The pale-eyed pygmy tyrant has a disjunct distribution. The subspecies are found thus:

- A. p. wilcoxi: Pacific slope of Panama from Chiriquí Province east to the Canal Zone
- A. p. pilaris: northern Colombia from Bolívar Department south to Huila Department and east into Zulia and northwestern Táchira states in northwestern Venezuela
- A. p. venezuelensis: northern Venezuela from Falcón east to Sucre
- A. p. griseiceps: from east-central Colombia's Meta Department east across northern Amazonas and northern Bolívar states in Venezuela; separately in a small area of western Guyana and adjoining Roraima in northern Brazil

The pale-eyed pygmy tyrant inhabits a variety of landscapes, most of them somewhat dry. These include dry to arid scrublands, open woodland, and savanna, and also moister deciduous and semi-deciduous woodlands, secondary forest, gallery forest, patches of suburban and urban forest, and shrubby borders of croplands. In coastal Colombia it also is found in mangroves for part of the year. In elevation it reaches 900 m (3,000 ft) in Panama, 1,800 m (5,900 ft) in Colombia, 1,700 m (5,600 ft) in far western Venezuela, and 300 m (1,000 ft) in most of the rest of the country.

== Behavior ==
=== Movement ===
The pale-eyed pygmy tyrant is a year-round resident.

=== Feeding ===
The pale-eyed pygmy tyrant feeds mostly on insects and also includes small fruits in its diet. It forages singly or in pairs and occasionally joins mixed-species feeding flocks. It forages mostly from the forest's middle level to the canopy. It takes prey with short upward or downward sallies from the perch to grab it from leaves and also while briefly hovering after a short flight.

=== Breeding ===
The pale-eyed pygmy tyrant's breeding season has not been fully defined but includes as large a span as January to August in Colombia. In Venezuela its season includes at least May to July. The one known nest was an enclosed bag with a side entrance under an "awning"; it was suspended about 1.2 m (4 ft) above a pool of water. It was made from grass, reeds, and rushes. One egg is known; it was white with red-brown spots. The usual clutch size, incubation period, time to fledging, and details of parental care are not known.

=== Vocalization ===
The pale-eyed pygmy tyrant's vocalizations are loud for a small bird. One author described its voice as "[d]ry tic notes and rapid nasal trills...often combined, e.g. tic-tttttttttt". Another described it as a "very high, slightly descending, dry 'prruh' trill".

== Status ==
The IUCN has assessed the pale-eyed pygmy tyrant as being of least concern. It has a very large range and its estimated population of at least 500,000 mature individuals is believed to be stable. No immediate threats have been identified. It is considered common in Colombia and Venezuela. It occurs in many protected areas and "commonly thrives in secondary growth and a wide range of disturbed habitats such as urban forests, crops, and botanical gardens, among others".
