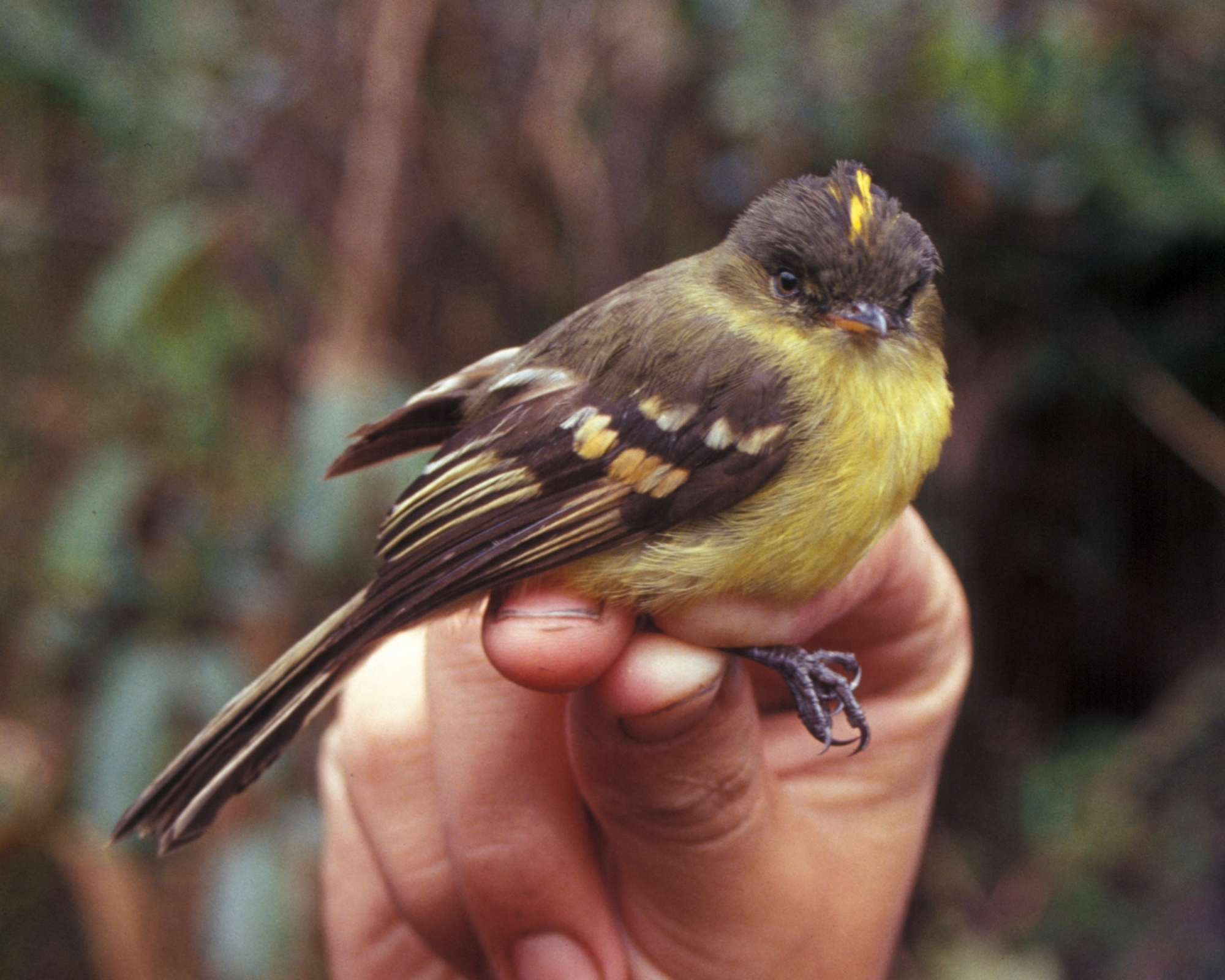
- Orange-banded flycatcher (Nephelomyias lintoni)

Scientific classification
- Kingdom: Animalia
- Phylum: Chordata
- Class: Aves
- Order: Passeriformes
- Family: Tyrannidae
- Genus: Nephelomyias; Ohlson, Fjeldsa and Ericson, 2009

Type species
- Mitrephorus ochraceiventris Cabanis, 1873

= Nephelomyias =

Genus of birds

Nephelomyias is a genus of birds in the tyrant flycatcher family Tyrannidae. It contains the following three species:

Image	Common name	Scientific name	Distribution
	Orange-banded flycatcher	Nephelomyias lintoni	southern Ecuador and far northern Peru
	Ochraceous-breasted flycatcher	Nephelomyias ochraceiventris	Bolivia and Peru
	Handsome flycatcher	Nephelomyias pulcher	Bolivia, Colombia, Ecuador, and Peru
