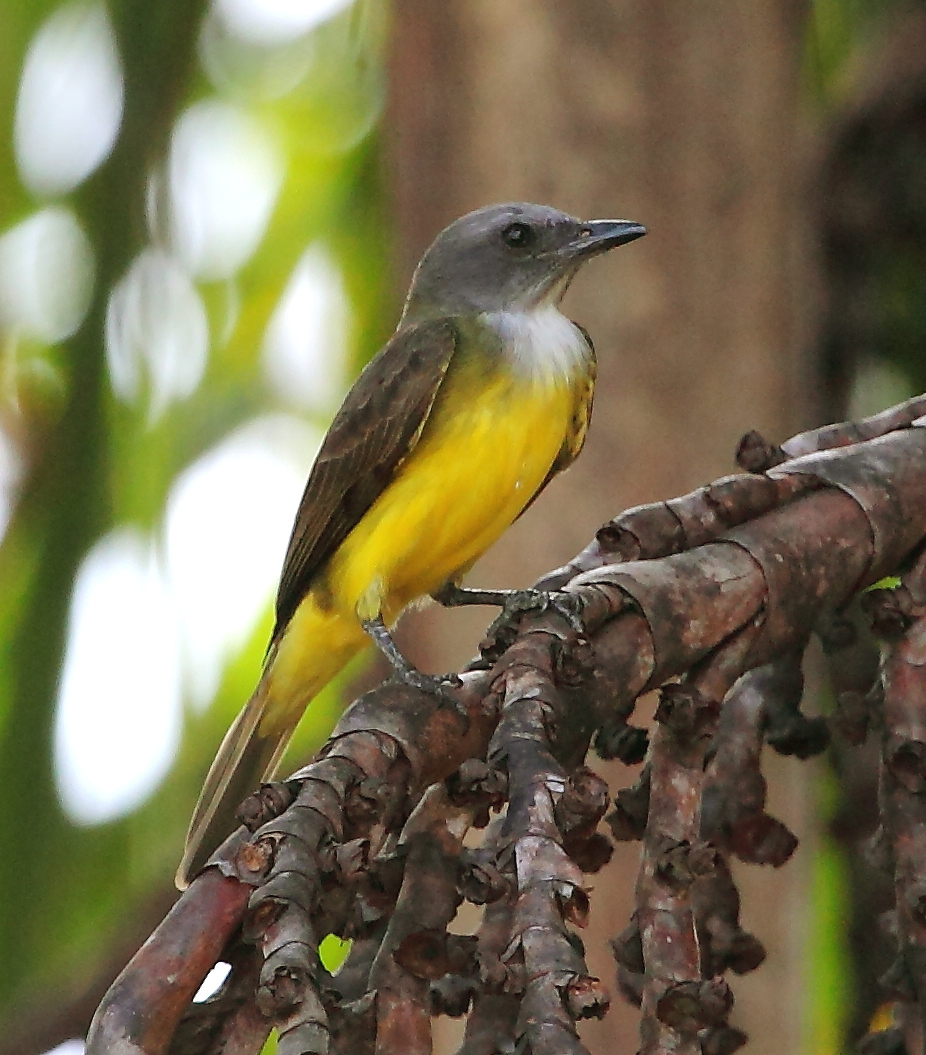
- At Manaus, Amazonas state, Brazil

Conservation status
- Least Concern (IUCN 3.1)

Scientific classification
- Kingdom: Animalia
- Phylum: Chordata
- Class: Aves
- Order: Passeriformes
- Family: Tyrannidae
- Genus: Tyrannopsis; Ridgway, 1905
- Species: T. sulphurea

Binomial name
- Tyrannopsis sulphurea (Spix, 1825)

= Sulphury flycatcher =

Species of bird

The sulphury flycatcher (Tyrannopsis sulphurea) is a passerine bird of the family Tyrannidae, the tyrant flycatchers. It is found on Trinidad and in every mainland South American country except Argentina, Chile, Paraguay, and Uruguay.

== Taxonomy and systematics ==
The sulphury flycatcher was originally described as Muscicapa sulphurea, erroneously classifying it as an Old World flycatcher. Robert Ridgway erected genus Tyrannopsis for it in 1905.

The sulphury flycatcher is the only member of its genus and has no subspecies.

== Description ==
The sulphury flycatcher is about 19 to 20 cm (7.5 to 7.9 in) long and weighs 48 to 61 g (1.7 to 2.2 oz). The sexes have the same plumage. Adults have a mostly dusky head with a mostly hidden orange-yellow patch in the center of the crown, an indistinct whitish supercilium, and a blackish band from the lores to the ear coverts. Their upperparts and tail are dull olive brown. Their wings are dark brownish dusky. Their throat is whitish with blurry dark gray streaks on its sides. Their upper breast is white and the rest of their underparts bright yellow. Their breast has an olive gray wash and olive gray streaks on its sides and their flanks have an olivaceous tinge. They have a brown iris, a black bill, and black legs and feet.

== Distribution and habitat ==
The sulphury flycatcher is primarily a bird of the Amazon Basin whose range extends north across the Guiana Shield and includes the offshore island of Trinidad. On the mainland it is found in eastern Colombia, northeastern Ecuador, eastern Peru, far northern Bolivia, eastern Venezuela, the Guianas, and much of northern Brazil. In that country the range's southern edge crosses north-central and eastern Rondônia, the northern half of Mato Grosso, western Tocantins, and the northwestern half of Maranhão. The sulphury flycatcher is almost exclusively associated with moriche palms, inhabiting clusters of them in swampy forest (especially around oxbow lakes), more scattered ones in savanna, and sometimes isolated ones in cultivated areas and near houses. In elevation it is found from sea level to 400 m (1,300 ft) in Brazil and to 500 m (1,600 ft) in Venezuela. It reaches 1,200 m (3,900 ft) in Colombia, 400 m (1,300 ft) in Ecuador, and 600 m (2,000 ft) in Peru.

== Behavior ==
=== Movement ===
The sulphury flycatcher is believed to be a year-round resident throughout its range. However, there is some evidence that at least in Venezuela it might make some seasonal movements.

=== Feeding ===
The sulphury flycatcher feeds primarily on insects and includes some fruit in its diet. It has been observed feeding on Cecropia and Virola fruits. It typically forages singly or in pairs but has been seen doing so in small family groups. It captures flying prey in mid-air with sallies, sometimes quite long, from a tree. It often takes fruit while briefly hovering.

=== Breeding ===
The sulphury flycatcher's breeding season has not been fully defined but appears to include parts or all of the December to May span in the north. Its nest is an open cup made from sticks and placed in the crown of a palm tree. A nest in Trinidad held two eggs that were rich cream color with a violet-gray cast and heavy brown marks. The incubation period, time to fledging, and details of parental care are not known.

=== Vocalization ===
The sulphury flycatcher is not highly vocal. One description of its song is a "high-pitched, penetrating ser[ies] of blurred trills, zhr'dek ... zhr'r're'k ... zhr'dek'dek ..., like pulses of electric energy". Another is "a shrill, buzzy DZEE'E'E djeeh-chew djeeh-chew! often in duet". One call is "abrupt, high-energy outbursts of strident, almost electrified screeches, zhrEEEEEEEE!, zhr-zhrEEEEEEEEE!". Another is a simple "squeaky tseee!".

== Status ==
The IUCN has assessed the sulphury flycatcher as being of Least Concern. It has an very large range; its population size is not known but is believed to be stable. No immediate threats have been identified. It is considered uncommon in Colombia, "scarce and local" in Ecuador, "rare and local" in Peru, "uncommon and local" in Venezuela, and uncommon in Brazil. "Human activity probably has little short-term direct effect on Sulphury Flycatcher, other than through habitat destruction."
