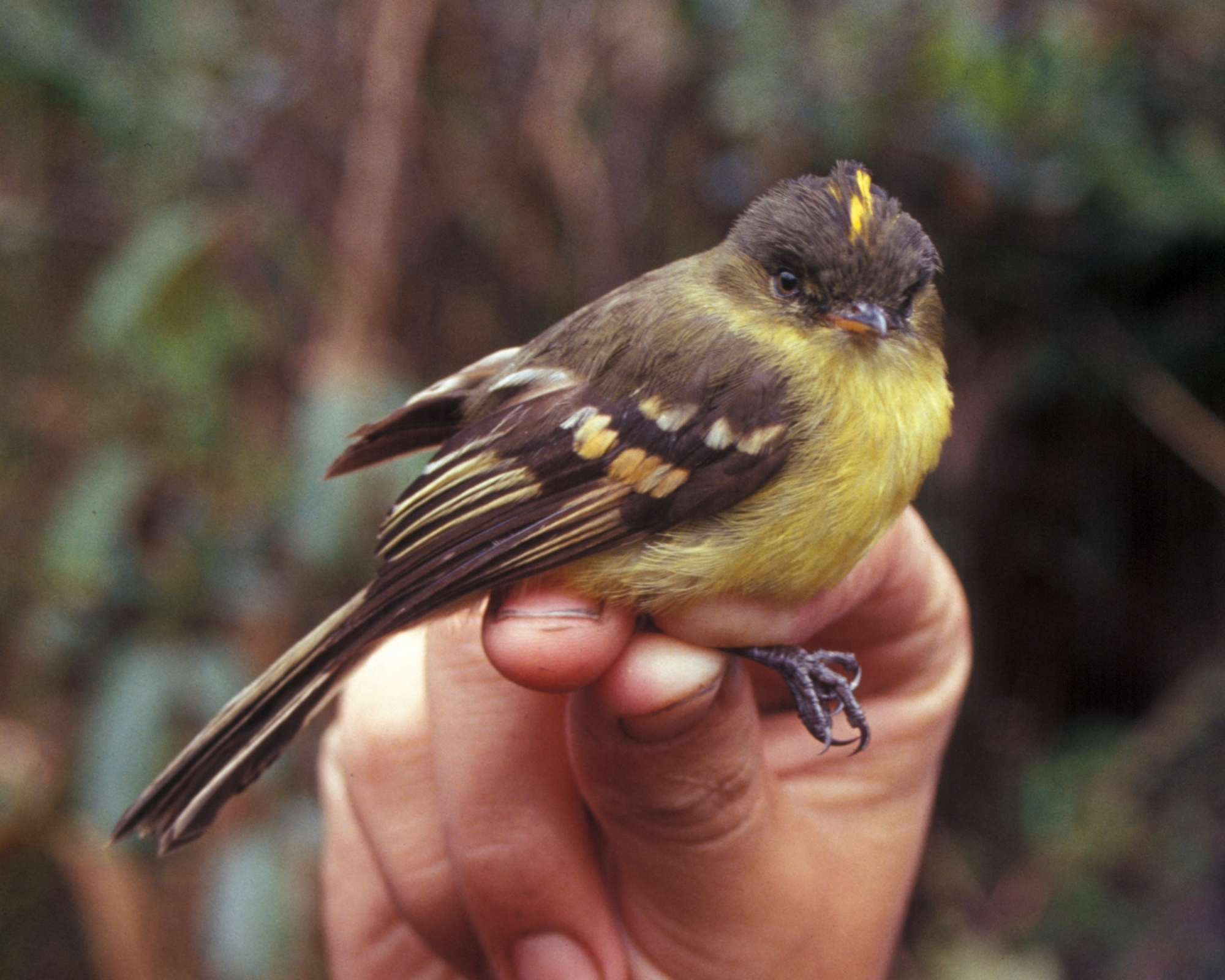

Conservation status
- Least Concern (IUCN 3.1)

Scientific classification
- Kingdom: Animalia
- Phylum: Chordata
- Class: Aves
- Order: Passeriformes
- Family: Tyrannidae
- Genus: Nephelomyias
- Species: N. lintoni

Binomial name
- Nephelomyias lintoni (Meyer de Schauensee, 1951)

Synonyms
- Myiophobus lintoni

= Orange-banded flycatcher =

Species of bird

The orange-banded flycatcher (Nephelomyias lintoni) is a species of bird in the family Tyrannidae, the tyrant flycatchers. It is found in Ecuador and Peru.

== Taxonomy and systematics ==
The orange-banded flycatcher was originally described in 1951 as Myiophobus lintoni. Its specific epithet honors M. Albert Linton, who at the time was the president of the Academy of Natural Sciences of Philadelphia. A study published in 2009 determined that the orange-banded flycatcher and two other species did not belong in Myiophobus so the genus Nephelomyias was created for them in 2010.

The orange-banded flycatcher is monotypic. It and the ochraceous-breasted flycatcher (N. ochraceiventris) are sister species and form a superspecies.

== Description ==
The orange-banded flycatcher is 12.5 to 13 cm (4.9 to 5.1 in) long; two males weighed 9.5 and 10 g (0.34 and 0.35 oz). The sexes are very similar. Adult males have a very dark brownish olive crown with a partly hidden yellow, orange, or rufous patch in the middle. Both sexes have a thin very pale yellow eye-ring on an otherwise dark brownish olive face. Their back and rump are dark brownish olive. Their wings are dusky with thin buffy or whitish edges on the flight feathers and wide cinnamon, ochraceous, or buffy tips on the wing coverts; the latter show as two wing bars. Their tail is dusky. Their throat is whitish yellow and their underparts are yellow with an olive wash on the sides of the breast. Adult females have a smaller, dull brown, crown patch or none at all. Adults have a grayish yellow iris, blackish legs and feet, and a bill with a blackish maxilla and an orange mandible with a black tip. Juveniles do not have a crown patch; their wing bars are a deeper rufous buff and their underparts are paler than adults'. Their bill is yellow but for a black tip on the maxilla.

== Distribution and habitat ==
The orange-banded flycatcher is found on the eastern slope of the Andes from Azuay and Morona-Santiago provinces in southern Ecuador south into far northern Peru's Piura and Amazonas departments north of the Marañón River. It inhabits humid montane and elfin forest and also early successional growth in disturbed areas such as landslides. In elevation it ranges mostly between 2,250 and 3,200 m (7,400 and 10,500 ft) in Ecuador and between 2,400 and 2,750 m (7,900 and 9,000 ft) in Peru.

== Behavior ==
=== Movement ===
The orange-banded flycatcher is believed to be a year-round resident.

=== Feeding ===
The orange-banded flycatcher is believed to feed mostly on insects and some small seeds. It typically forages in small groups (possibly families) from the forest's mid-story to its canopy and often joins mixed-species feeding flocks. It often perches upright on outer branches and on large leaves. It takes prey from foliage with short flights to hover-glean and also in mid-air.

=== Breeding ===
The orange-banded flycatcher's breeding season has not been defined but appears to include April to October. Nothing else is known about the species' breeding biology.

=== Vocalization ===
The orange-banded flycatcher's dawn song is "a simple and monotonous series of 'tsin' notes" and its call "a sharp and arresting 'peeyk' given repeatedly as it forages".

== Status ==
The IUCN originally in 1988 assessed the orange-banded flycatcher as Near Threatened but since March 2023 as being of Least Concern. It has a restricted range; its population size is not known and is believed to be stable. "Parts of its range have been degraded and suitable forest has been felled, mainly for conversion to agricultural fields and through livestock grazing. Tree cover loss however has been negligible over the past ten years [since 2012]." It is considered local in Ecuador and uncommon and local in Peru.
