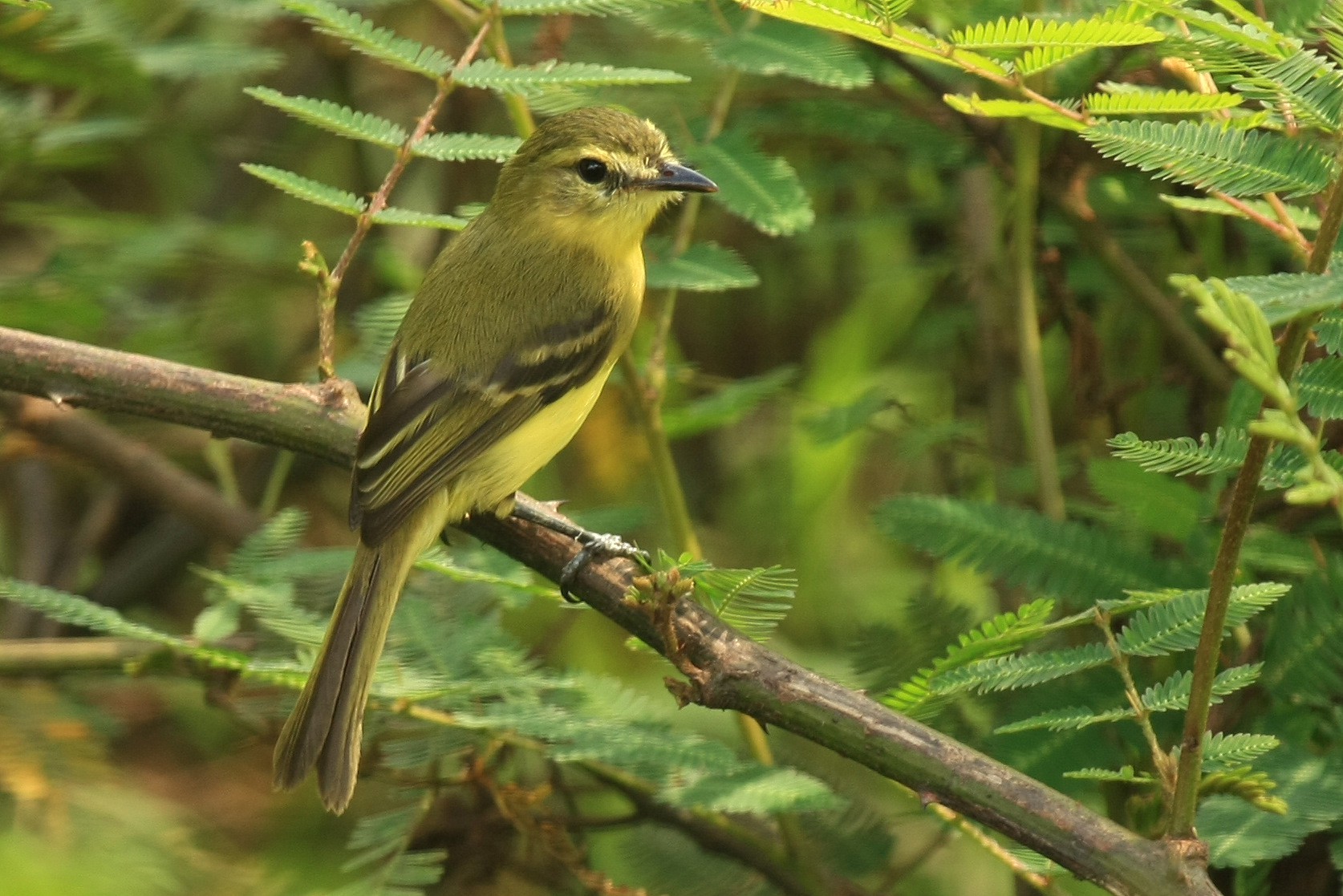
- In Costa Rica

Conservation status
- Least Concern (IUCN 3.1)

Scientific classification
- Kingdom: Animalia
- Phylum: Chordata
- Class: Aves
- Order: Passeriformes
- Family: Tyrannidae
- Genus: Capsiempis; Cabanis & Heine, 1860
- Species: C. flaveola

Binomial name
- Capsiempis flaveola (Lichtenstein, MHC, 1823)

Subspecies
- see text

= Yellow tyrannulet =

Species of bird

The yellow tyrannulet (Capsiempis flaveola) is a small passerine bird in subfamily Elaeniinae of family Tyrannidae, the tyrant flycatchers. It is found in Costa Rica, Nicaragua, Panama, and in every mainland South American country except Chile and Uruguay.

== Taxonomy and systematics ==
The yellow tyrannulet was originally described in 1823 as Muscicapa flaveola and in 1859 moved to the newly created genus Capsiempis. In the 1970s that genus was merged into Phylloscartes but by 1990 it had been resurrected. The yellow tyrannulet is the only member of genus Capsiempis.

The yellow tyrannulet has these five subspecies:

- C. f. semiflava (Lawrence, 1865)
- C. f. cerula Wetmore, 1939
- C. f. leucophrys Berlepsch, 1907
- C. f. magnirostris Hartert, EJO, 1898
- C. f. flaveola (Lichtenstein, MHC, 1823)

== Description ==
The yellow tyrannulet is 10 to 11.5 cm (3.9 to 4.5 in) long and weighs about 8 grams (0.28 oz). The sexes have the same plumage. Adults of the nominate subspecies C. f. flaveola have a dark yellowish olive crown with a somewhat bushy crest. They have a bright yellow supercilium, a bright yellow partial eye ring, and a dark line through the eye on an otherwise yellowish face. Their upperparts are dark yellowish olive. Their wings and tail are dusky olive with pale yellow to buffy yellow edges on the flight feathers and tips on the wing coverts; the last show as two wide but indistinct wing bars. Their throat and underparts are bright yellow with an ochraceous tinge on most of the breast and an olive tinge on its sides.

Subspecies C. f. semiflava has much paler yellow underparts and somewhat more distinct wing bars than the nominate. C. f. leucophrys is the largest subspecies and has the longest bill. It has a mostly white supercilium and a whitish throat. C. f. cerula is next in size after leucophrys and resembles it but with an entirely yellow supercilium like the nominate. C. f. magnirostris has the thickest bill of the subspecies. It is otherwise like the nominate except for a paler yellow supercilium. Both sexes of all subspecies have a dark brown iris, a longish and somewhat curved black bill with a pale base to the mandible, and dark gray legs and feet.

== Distribution and habitat ==
The yellow tyrannulet has a highly disjunct distribution The subspecies are found thus:

- C. f. semiflava: on the Caribbean slope from southeastern Nicaragua south through Costa Rica slightly into Panama, on the Pacific slope from San José and central Puntarenas provinces in Costa Rica into Panama on both coasts to eastern Colón and Panamá provinces, and on Panama's Isla Coiba. Also a single record in Honduras
- C. f. cerula: Colombia and Venezuela east of the Andes east through the Guianas into northern Brazil's Amapá state, south into northeastern Ecuador, south into central Amazonian Brazil, south through western Amazonian Brazil into northeastern Peru, and locally in southeastern Peru and northern Bolivia.
- C. f. leucophrys: from the Magdalena River valley and Sucre Department in Colombia east into northwestern Venezuela through Zulia and Táchira states to southwestern Lara state
- C. f. magnirostris: west-central Ecuador from western Pichincha Province south to Guayas and El Oro provinces
- C. f. flaveola: southeastern Bolivia, eastern and southeastern Brazil as far north as Paraíba and as far south as Rio Grande do Sul, eastern Paraguay, and northeastern Argentina's Misiones Province.

The yellow tyrannulet inhabits a variety of humid lowland landscapes, mostly in the tropical zone. Most are of somewhat low stature; it shuns the interior of tall forest. It occurs in dense thickets and vine tangles in forest clearings, around lakes, and along watercourses, and especially favors stands of bamboo. It also occurs in dense secondary forest, scrubby overgrown pastures and coffee plantations, and mangroves. In some areas it occurs in gallery forest and in Brazil in restinga. In elevation it reaches 600 m (2,000 ft) on the Caribbean slope of Costa Rica, 1,200 m (3,900 ft) on the Pacific slope there, 800 m (2,600 ft) in Colombia, 1,500 m (4,900 ft) in Ecuador, 1,150 m (3,800 ft) in Peru, 600 m (2,000 ft) in western Venezuela, 300 m (1,000 ft) in eastern Venezuela, and 1,500 m (4,900 ft) in Brazil.

== Behavior ==
=== Movement ===
The yellow tyrannulet is a year-round resident throughout its range.

=== Feeding ===
The yellow tyrannulet feeds mostly on small insects and occasionally includes small fruits and berries in its diet. It typically forages in pairs or small family groups and only rarely joins mixed-species feeding flocks. It is an active forager, moving restlessly through thick foliage and feeding mostly by gleaning while perched. It also takes prey while briefly hovering after a short sally from a perch but only rarely captures prey in mid-air.

=== Breeding ===
The yellow tyrannulet's breeding season varies geographically. It apparently breeds nearly year-round in Costa Rica and possibly so in Panama. It breeds in at least April and May in Colombia and from July perhaps to December in Peru. Its only fully-described nests were in Costa Rica. They were open cups made from plant fibers, grass, shreds of bark, and moss, and usually had moss on their outside. They were typically placed in a fork or crevice in a tall shrub or short tree between about 3 and 6 m (10 and 20 ft) above the ground. The clutch size was two white eggs. The incubation period, time to fledging, and details of parental care are not known.

=== Vocalization ===
The yellow tyrannulet is very vocal; its songs vary across its wide range and often include duets. In Costa Rica it sings a "sputtering series of wheep or wee-deep notes". In Ecuador the song is described as "a pleasant and rollicking series of notes that often seem to lack much pattern, usually starting slowly but then quickly speeding up". In Peru it sings "a rhythmic chatter: tchippy'per-tchippy'per-tchippy'per...". In Venezuela the song is described as a "lively, sputtering...rhythmic pít-tic-keek (pretty-cake), spit out, repeated rapidly 10 times or more when excited". In most areas its calls are simple trills like trrrrrrr or brrrrrrt that have been likened to the vocalization of a toad.

== Status ==
The IUCN has assessed the yellow tyrannulet as being of Least Concern. It has an extremely large range; its estimated population of at least five million mature individuals is believed to be decreasing. No immediate threats have been identified. It is considered common in Costa Rica, locally fairly common in Colombia, common in western Ecuador and local in the northeast, patchily distributed in Peru, and fairly common in Venezuela. It occurs in many protected areas both public and private throughout its range. "Given its tolerance of converted habitats and secondary habitats, this species is not considered likely to become threatened in near future."
