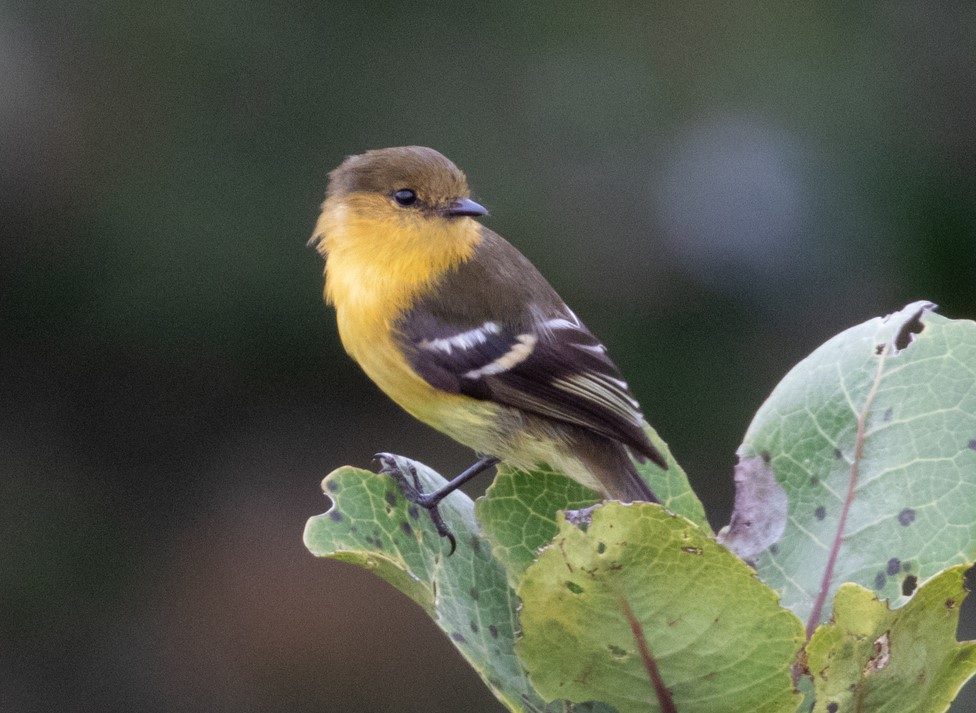

Conservation status
- Least Concern (IUCN 3.1)

Scientific classification
- Kingdom: Animalia
- Phylum: Chordata
- Class: Aves
- Order: Passeriformes
- Family: Tyrannidae
- Genus: Nephelomyias
- Species: N. ochraceiventris

Binomial name
- Nephelomyias ochraceiventris (Cabanis, 1873)

Synonyms
- Mitrephorus ochraceiventris; Myiophobus ochraceiventris

= Ochraceous-breasted flycatcher =

Species of bird

The ochraceous-breasted flycatcher (Nephelomyias ochraceiventris) is a species of bird in the family Tyrannidae, the tyrant flycatchers. It is found in Bolivia and Peru.

== Taxonomy and systematics ==
The ochraceous-breasted flycatcher was originally described in 1873 as Mitrephorus ochraceiventris. From the early twentieth century it was classified in genus Myiophobus. A study published in 2009 determined that the ochraceous-breasted flycatcher and two other species did not belong in Myiophobus so the genus Nephelomyias was created for them in 2010.

The ochraceous-breasted flycatcher is monotypic. It and the orange-banded flycatcher (N. lintoni) are sister species and form a superspecies.

== Description ==
The ochraceous-breasted flycatcher is 12 to 14 cm (4.7 to 5.5 in) long and weighs 8.2 to 13 g (0.29 to 0.46 oz). The sexes are very similar. Adult males have an olive crown with a partly hidden orange (in the north) to red-orange (in the south) patch in the middle. Both sexes have dusky lores and a thin buffy eye-ring on an otherwise yellowish olive face. Their back and rump are olive to olive brown. Their wings are dusky with wide whitish or buffy tips on the wing coverts that show as two wing bars. Their tail is dusky. Their throat and breast are ochraceous yellow to ochraceous buff and their belly yellow. Adult females have a smaller, reddish chestnut, crown patch. Adults have a dark brown iris, black legs and feet, and a black bill. Juveniles usually do not have a crown patch; if present it is yellow in males.

== Distribution and habitat ==
The ochraceous-breasted flycatcher is found on the eastern slope of the Andes from central Amazonas Department in northern Peru south into Bolivia as far as eastern La Paz Department. It inhabits the interior and edges of humid montane forest and elfin forest. In elevation it ranges between 2,200 and 3,700 m (7,200 and 12,100 ft).

== Behavior ==
=== Movement ===
The ochraceous-breasted flycatcher is believed to be a year-round resident.

=== Feeding ===
The ochraceous-breasted flycatcher is believed to feed mostly on insects and some small fruits. It typically forages in small groups (possibly families) from the forest's mid-story to its canopy and often joins mixed-species feeding flocks. It often perches upright on large heavy leaves. It takes prey from foliage with short flights to hover-glean.

=== Breeding ===
Only one nest of the ochraceous-breasted flycatcher is known. It was a globe built into moss and ferns 60 cm (2 ft) above the ground. Discovered in October, it contained two eggs that were white with a few brown speckles. The incubation period, time to fledging, and details of parental care are not known.

=== Vocalization ===
As of early 2025 xeno-canto had only six recordings of ochraceous-breasted flycatcher vocalizations; the Cornell Lab of Ornithology's Macaulay Library had 12 with some overlap. The species' song is "a chip followed by a shrill, short trill: tsip...tsop-teeerrr" and its calls are "sharp tsip or tip notes".

== Status ==
The IUCN has assessed the ochraceous-breasted flycatcher as being of Least Concern. Its population size is not known and is believed to be decreasing. No immediate threats have been identified. It is considered fairly common in Peru. "Human activity probably has little short term effect on Ochraceous-breasted Flycatcher."
