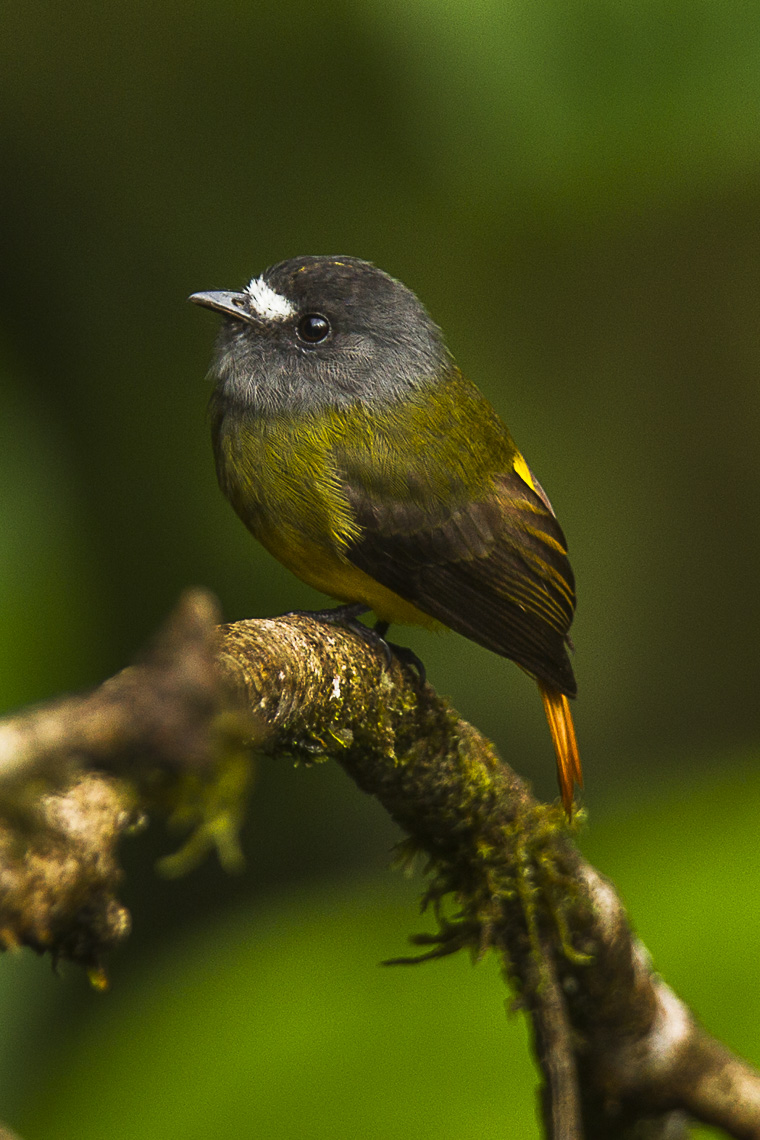

Conservation status
- Least Concern (IUCN 3.1)

- Least Concern (IUCN 3.1)

Scientific classification
- Kingdom: Animalia
- Phylum: Chordata
- Class: Aves
- Order: Passeriformes
- Family: Tyrannidae
- Genus: Myiotriccus; Ridgway, 1905
- Species: M. ornatus

Binomial name
- Myiotriccus ornatus (Lafresnaye, 1853)
- Range of "western" ornate flycatcher (see the Taxonomy and Distribution sections)

= Ornate flycatcher =

Species of bird

The ornate flycatcher (Myiotriccus ornatus) is a species of bird in the family Tyrannidae, the tyrant flycatchers. It is found in Colombia, Ecuador, and Peru. It is the only species in the genus Myiotriccus.

== Taxonomy and systematics ==
The ornate flycatcher was originally described in 1853 as Tyrannula ornata. It was moved to its present genus Myiotriccus following its erection by Ridgway in 1905, and is the only species in that genus.

Beyond its reclassification the ornate flycatcher's taxonomy is unsettled. The International Ornithological Committee, the Clements taxonomy, and the South American Classification Committee of the American Ornithological Society treat it as a single species with these four subspecies:

- M. o. ornatus (Lafresnaye, 1853)
- M. o. stellatus (Cabanis, 1873)
- M. o. phoenicurus (Sclater, PL, 1855)
- M. o. aureiventris (Sclater, PL, 1874)

However, BirdLife International's Handbook of the Birds of the World (HBW) treats M. o. ornatus and M. o. stellatus as the "western ornate flycatcher" and the other two as subspecies of the "eastern ornate flycatcher", M. phoenicurus. Clements groups the two pairs as "ornate flycatcher (western)" and "ornate flycatcher (eastern)" within the single species.

This article follows the one-species, four-subspecies model.

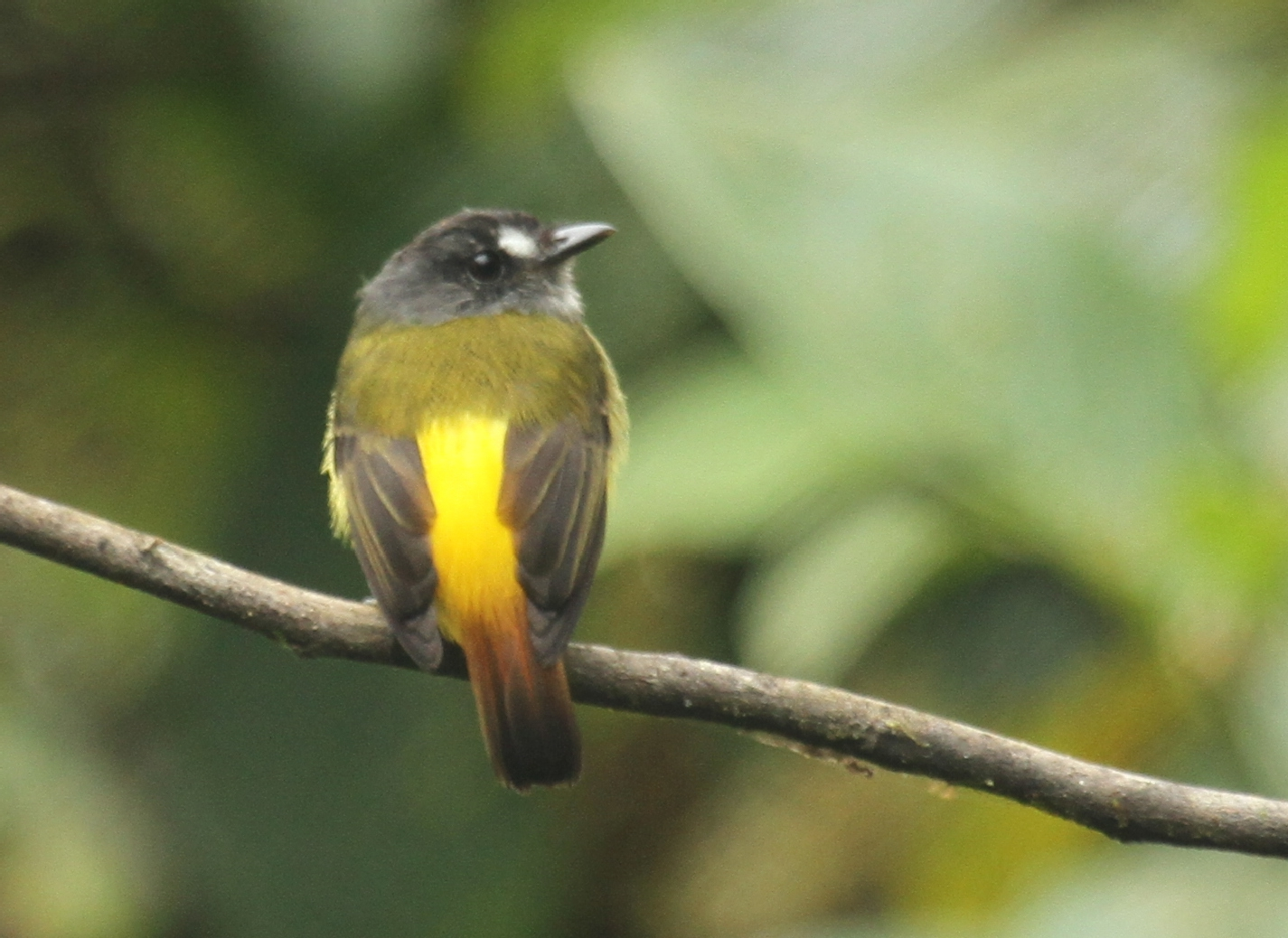
Mashpi Reserve - Ecuador

== Description ==
The ornate flycatcher is about 11 to 12 cm (4.3 to 4.7 in) long and weighs 8.2 to 13.4 g (0.29 to 0.47 oz). The sexes are alike in plumage; females are slightly smaller than males. Adults of the nominate subspecies M. o. ornatus have a mostly black head with a white crescent in front of the eye and a partly hidden bright yellow patch in the middle of the crown. Their back is deep olive and their rump bright golden-yellow. Their wings are dusky black. Their tail's base is bright rufous and its outer half is dusky black. Their throat is gray, their breast rich olive, and their belly bright golden-yellow. They have a dark brown iris, black or brown legs and feet, and a black bill. Subspecies M. o. stellatus is much smaller than the nominate, with a smaller white crescent on the face that often has a gap in the middle and a yellowish base to the tail. M. o. phoenicurus has an entirely rufous tail, an iris that can vary from gray to dark brown, black or slate legs and feet, and sometimes a creamy white base to the bill's mandible. M. o. aureiventris has a slightly lighter green back, a lighter gray throat, and a lighter green breast than the nominate. Its iris, legs and feet, and bill are like those of phoenicurus.

== Distribution and habitat ==
The subspecies of the ornate flycatcher are found thus:

- M. o. ornatus: the Central range and northern and central part of the Eastern range of the Colombian Andes
- M. o. stellatus: Colombia's Western Andes and south through Ecuador on the western slope of the Andes to El Oro Province
- M. o. phoenicurus: from Caquetá Department in Colombia's Eastern Andes south through Ecuador on the eastern slope of the Andes and into northern Peru to the Marañón River
- M. o. aureiventris: eastern slope of the Andes in Peru from Huánuco Department south to Puno Department

The ornate flycatcher inhabits humid montane forest, mature secondary forest, and woodlands in the Andean foothills. It favors dark mossy ravines and the edges somewhat open areas such as landslides, gaps caused by fallen trees, regrowing clearings, and along small watercourses. In elevation it ranges between 600 and 2,400 m (2,000 and 7,900 ft) in Colombia, mostly between 800 and 2,000 m (2,600 and 6,600 ft) but lower in the northwest in Ecuador, and between 700 and 2,200 m (2,300 and 7,200 ft) in Peru.

== Behavior ==
=== Movement ===
The ornate flycatcher is a year-round resident.

=== Feeding ===
The ornate flycatcher's diet has not been detailed but is believed to be mostly insects. It typically forages in pairs though sometimes singly; it infrequently joins mixed-species feeding flocks and only when they traverse its territory. It forages from the forest understory to its mid-story, usually at the same site for long periods of time. It perches upright on exposed perches, takes prey in mid-air with short flights, and often returns to the same perch.

=== Breeding ===
The ornate flycatcher's breeding season has not been defined but appears to vary geographically. In Colombia in includes March to May, in Ecuador at least July, and in southeastern Peru from August to December. Its nest is a ball or dome made from rootlets and moss with a lining of grasses. Most of those discovered were within about 5 m (15 ft) of the ground in a shrub, tree, or palm. The eggs have a cream or off-white base color with small cinnamon flecks. The usual clutch size, incubation period, time to fledging, and details of parental care are not known.

=== Vocalization ===
The ornate flycatcher's dawn song is "a sharp note followed by a chippering trill: PSEW! tititititi". Its calls include "a sharp, squeaky PSEW", a "quiet pip pip pip", and "a sharp, high pitched, and emphatic 'wheep!' or 'peeyp!' ".

== Status ==
The IUCN follows HBW taxonomy and so has separately assessed the "western" and "eastern" ornate flycatchers. Both are assessed as being of Least Concern. Both have large ranges and unknown population sizes that are believed to be decreasing. No immediate threats to either have been identified. The species is considered common in Colombia, "common and conspicuous" in Ecuador, and "one of the most characteristic birds of lower eastern slopes of Andes" in Peru. It occurs in many protected areas across its range.
