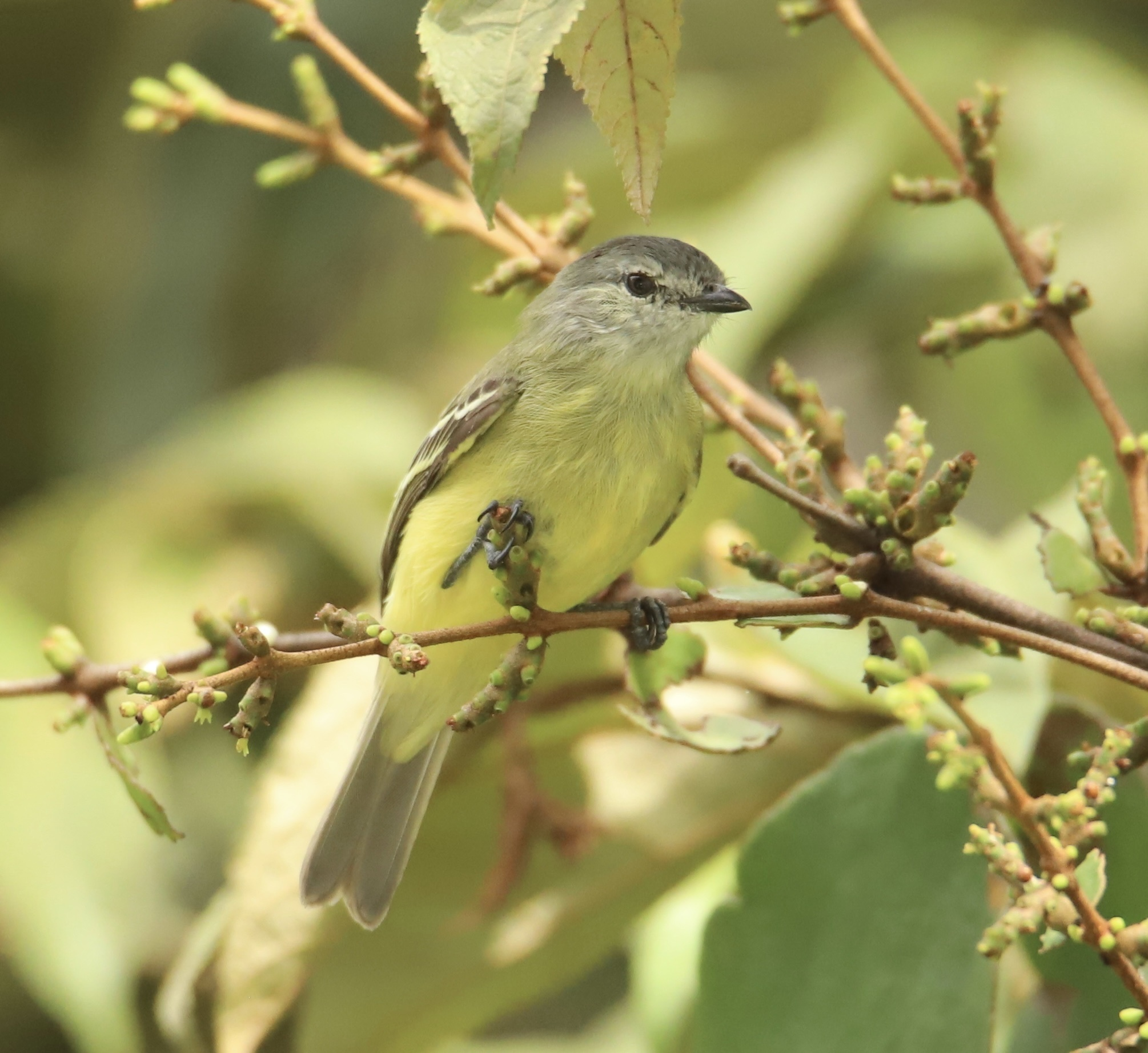

Conservation status
- Least Concern (IUCN 3.1)

Scientific classification
- Kingdom: Animalia
- Phylum: Chordata
- Class: Aves
- Order: Passeriformes
- Family: Tyrannidae
- Genus: Tyrannulus; Vieillot, 1816
- Species: T. elatus

Binomial name
- Tyrannulus elatus (Latham, 1790)

= Yellow-crowned tyrannulet =

Species of bird

The yellow-crowned tyrannulet (Tyrannulus elatus) is a species of bird in subfamily Elaeniinae of family Tyrannidae, the tyrant flycatchers. It is found in Costa Rica, Panama, and in every mainland South American country except Argentina, Chile, Paraguay, and Uruguay.

== Taxonomy and systematics ==
The yellow-crowned tyrannulet was originally described as Sylvia elata in 1790; it was reclassified in genus Tyrannulus in 1816. It is the only member of genus Tyrannulus and has no subspecies.

== Description ==
The yellow-crowned tyrannulet is 10 to 11 cm (3.9 to 4.3 in) long and weighs 6.5 to 8 g (0.23 to 0.28 oz). Adult males have a slate-gray to dark brown or blackish crown with a bright yellow to orange-yellow stripe along its middle. Their nape and back are bright olive-green. They have a grayish supercilium, a thin dark line through the eye, and a pale gray lower face. Their wings are dusky with two white to yellowish white bars. Their tail is dusky olive. Their throat is pale gray and their underparts pale to medium yellow with an olive wash on the breast. Females are smaller than males and have a paler gray crown and mid-crown stripe and slightly paler upperparts. Both sexes have a brown iris, a short and rounded black bill, and gray legs and feet.

== Distribution and habitat ==
The yellow-crowned tyrannulet has a disjunct distribution with two principal populations. One is found from north-central Puntarenas Province and northern San José Province on the Pacific slope of Costa Rica through Panama, south through western Colombia into western Ecuador as far as central Guayas Province, and east through northern Colombia into northwestern Venezuela. The other population is east of the Andes from eastern Colombia south through Ecuador and Peru into northern Bolivia and east through eastern Venezuela, the Guianas, and most of Amazonian Brazil. The yellow-crowned tyrannulet is a bird of the lowlands and foothills. It inhabits humid evergreen forest, especially its edges and shrubby openings in its interior, though also in the interior canopy. It also inhabits secondary forest, light woodland, coffee and citrus plantations, gardens, and suburban parks. In elevation it occurs up to 1,200 m (3,900 ft) in Costa Rica, 1,000 m (3,300 ft) in Colombia, 600 m (2,000 ft) in Ecuador, 1,050 m (3,400 ft) in Peru, and 1,200 m (3,900 ft) in Venezuela and Brazil.

== Behavior ==
=== Movement ===
The yellow-crowned tyrannulet is a year-round resident throughout its range.

=== Feeding ===
The yellow-crowned tyrannulet feeds on insects and small fruits, especially mistletoe (Loranthaceae) berries. It forages singly or in pairs and only rarely joins mixed-species feeding flocks. It forages mostly in the forest's canopy, taking prey by gleaning while perched and while briefly hovering.

=== Breeding ===
The yellow-crowned tyrannulet nests between March and August in Panama and between January and September in Colombia. Its nesting seasons elsewhere are not known. Its nest is a shallow cup made of thin twigs and fine plant fibers, some of which dangle below the nest. It is placed on a thin twig or where multiple twigs spread and is typically between 8 and 20 m (25 and 65 ft) above the ground. The clutch size is one or two eggs; apparently only the female incubates them. The incubation period, time to fledging, and other details of parental care are not known.

=== Vocalization ===
The yellow-crowned tyrannulet's song is a "2-noted, clear, plaintive 'wih-weér' (or 'free beer'), 2nd note higher, shorter, and stressed". It apparently differs little across the species' range.

== Status ==
The IUCN has assessed the yellow-crowned tyrannulet as being of Least Concern. It has an extremely large range and its estimated population of 50 million mature individuals is believed to be stable. No immediate threats have been identified. It is considered uncommon in Costa Rica though expanding its range there. It is considered common and widespread in the rest of its range. It occurs in many privately and publicly protected areas and "[t]olerates degraded and disturbed habitats, and also occurs in artificial habitats, such as plantations and gardens".
