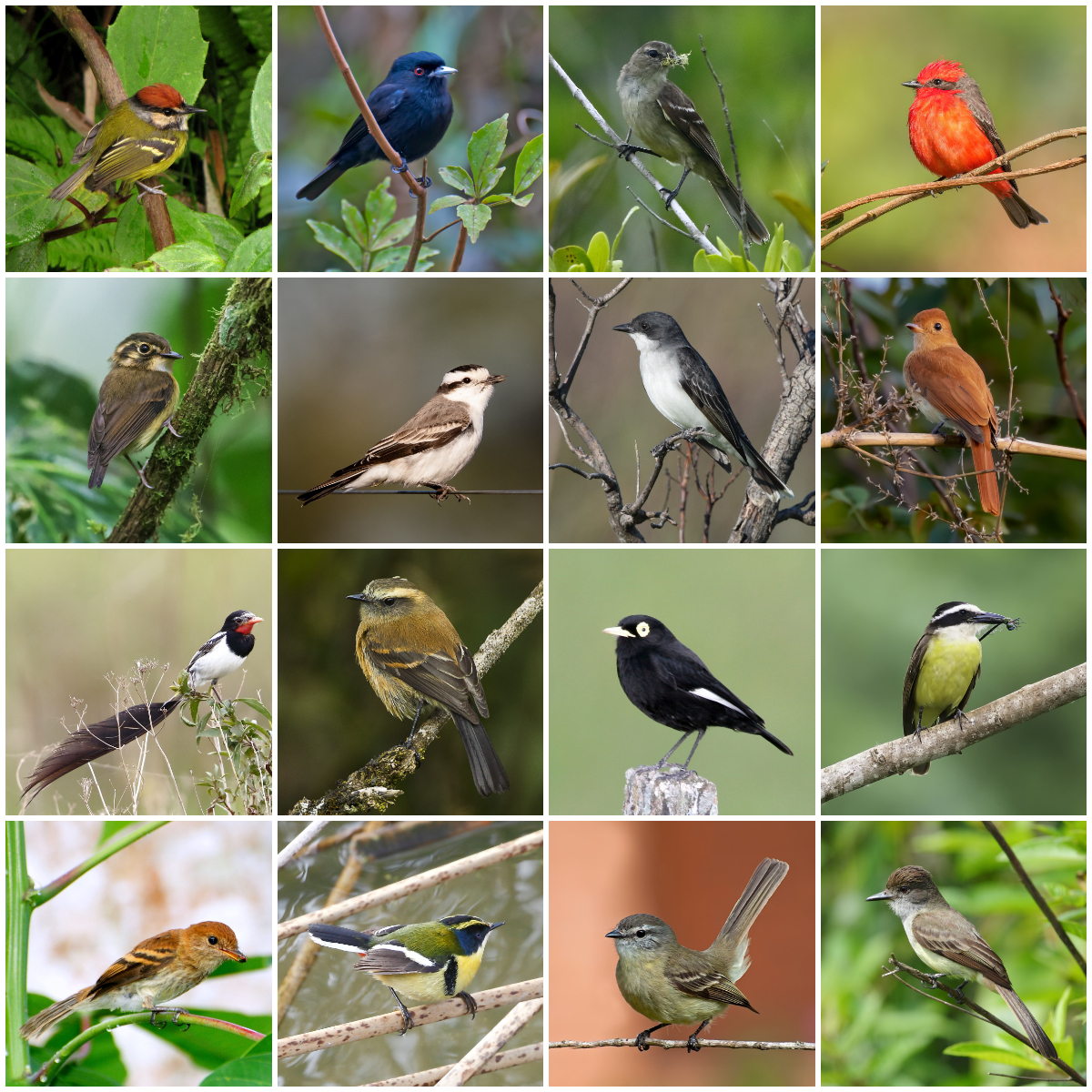
- Diversity of Tyrannidae

Scientific classification
- Kingdom: Animalia
- Phylum: Chordata
- Class: Aves
- Order: Passeriformes
- Parvorder: Tyrannida
- Family: Tyrannidae; Vigors, 1825

Type genus
- Tyrannus

Genera
- Some 100, see text
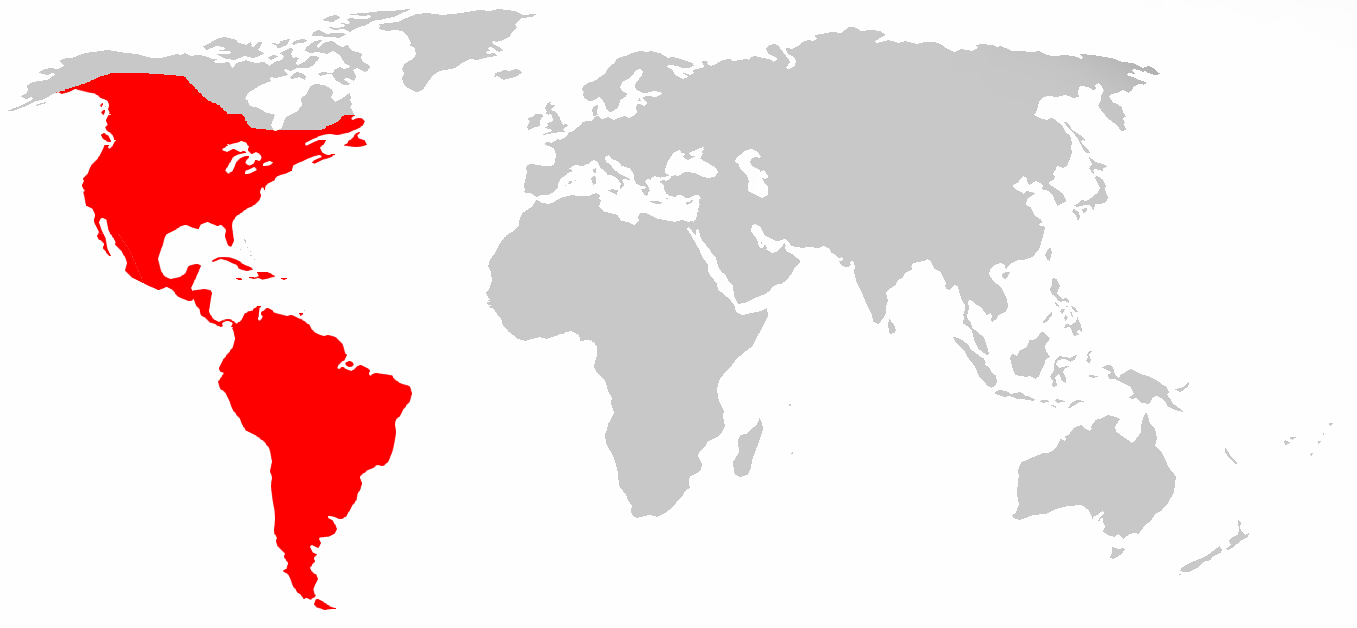
- Distribution of tyrant flycatchers

= Tyrant flycatcher =

Tyrant flycatchers

Family of birds found in the Americas

The tyrant flycatchers (Tyrannidae) comprise a family of passerine birds which is found throughout North and South America. It is the world's largest family of birds, with more than 400 species, and is the most diverse avian family in every country in the Americas, except for the United States and Canada. The members vary greatly in shape, patterns, size, and colors. Some tyrant flycatchers may superficially resemble the Old World flycatchers, which they are named after but are not closely related to. The Tyrannidae is a member of suborder Tyranni (suboscines), a group that lacks the sophisticated vocal capabilities of the songbirds (oscines).

A number of species previously included in this family are now placed in the family Tityridae (see Systematics). Sibley and Alquist in their 1990 bird taxonomy had the genera Mionectes, Leptopogon, Pseudotriccus, Poecilotriccus, Taenotriccus, Hemitriccus, Todirostrum and Corythopis as a separate family Pipromorphidae, but although it is still thought that these genera are basal to most of the family, they are not each other's closest relatives.

== Description ==
Most species are rather plain, with various hues of brown, gray and white commonplace, often providing some degree of presumed camouflage. Obvious exceptions include the bright red vermilion flycatcher, blue, black, white and yellow many-colored rush-tyrant and some species of tody-flycatchers or tyrants, which are often yellow, black, white and/or rufous, from the Todirostrum, Hemitriccus and Poecilotriccus genera. Several species have bright yellow underparts, from the ornate flycatcher to the great kiskadee. Some species have erectile crests. Several of the large genera (i.e. Elaenia, Myiarchus or Empidonax) are quite difficult to tell apart in the field due to similar plumage and some are best distinguished by their voices. Behaviorally, they can vary from species such as spadebills which are tiny, shy and live in dense forest interiors to kingbirds, which are relatively large, bold, inquisitive and often inhabit open areas near human habitations. As the name implies, a great majority of tyrant flycatchers are almost entirely insectivorous (though not necessarily specialized in flies). Tyrant flycatchers are largely opportunistic feeders and often catch any flying or arboreal insect they encounter. However, food can vary greatly and some (like the large great kiskadee) will eat fruit or small vertebrates (e.g. small frogs). In North America, most species are associated with a "sallying" feeding style, where they fly up to catch an insect directly from their perch and then immediately return to the same perch. Most tropical species, however, do not feed in this fashion and several types prefer to glean insects from leaves and bark. Tropical species are sometimes found in mixed-species foraging flocks, where various types of passerines and other smallish birds are found feeding in proximity.

The smallest family members are the closely related short-tailed pygmy tyrant and black-capped pygmy tyrant from the genus Myiornis (the first species usually being considered marginally smaller on average). These species reach a total length of 6.5–7 cm (2.6–2.8 in) and a weight of 4 to 5 g (0.14 to 0.18 oz). By length, they are the smallest passerines on earth, although some species of Old World warblers apparently rival them in their minuscule mean body masses if not in total length. The minuscule size and very short tail of the Myiornis pygmy tyrants often lend them a resemblance to a tiny ball or insect. The largest tyrant flycatcher is the great shrike-tyrant at 29 cm (11 in) and 99.2 grams (0.219 pounds). A few species such as the streamer-tailed tyrant, scissor-tailed flycatcher and fork-tailed flycatcher have a larger total length — up to 41 cm (16 in) in the fork-tailed flycatcher at least — but this is mainly due to their extremely long tails; the fork-tailed flycatcher has the longest tail feathers of any known bird relative to their size (this being in reference to true tail feathers, not to be confused with elongated tail streamers as seen in some from the Phasianidae family of galliforms).

== Habitat and distribution ==
Species richness of Tyrannidae, when compared to habitat, is highly variable, although most every land habitat in the Americas has at least some of these birds. The habitats of tropical lowland evergreen forest and montane evergreen forest have the highest single site species diversity while many habitats including rivers, palm forest, white sand forest, tropical deciduous forest edge, southern temperate forest, southern temperate forest edge, semi-humid/humid montane scrub, and northern temperate grassland have the lowest single species diversity. The variation between the highest and the lowest is extreme; ninety species can be found in the tropical lowland evergreen forests while the number of species that can be found in the habitats listed above typically are in the single digits. This may be due in part to the fewer niches found in certain areas and therefore fewer places for the species to occupy.

Tyrannidae specialization among habitats is very strong in tropical lowland evergreen forests and montane evergreen forests. These habitat types, therefore, display the greatest specialization. The counts differ by three species (tropical lowland evergreen forests have 49 endemic species and montane evergreen forests have 46 endemic species). It can be assumed that they both have similar levels of specialization.

Regionally, the Atlantic Forest has the highest species richness with the Chocó following closely behind.

== Status and conservation ==
The northern beardless tyrannulet (Camptostoma imberbe) is protected under the Migratory Bird Treaty Act of 1918. This species is common south of the US border. The situation for a number of other species from South and Central America is far more problematic. In 2007, BirdLife International (and consequently IUCN) considered two species, the Minas Gerais tyrannulet and Kaempfer's tody-tyrant critically endangered. Both are endemic to Brazil. Additionally, seven species were considered endangered and eighteen species vulnerable.

== Systematics ==
The family's name is derived from an early description of the eastern kingbird as "the tyrant" by naturalist Mark Catesby in the 1730s. Carl Linnaeus adopted that name for the entire family Tyrannidae, because he admired Catesby's work.

The family contains 447 species divided into 104 genera. A full list, sortable by common and binomial names, is at list of tyrant flycatcher species. Species in the genera Tityra, Pachyramphus, Laniocera and Xenopsaris were formerly placed in this family, but evidence suggested they belong in their own family, the Tityridae, where they are now placed by SACC.

Image	Genus	Species
	Piprites Cabanis, 1847	Wing-barred piprites, Piprites chloris; Grey-headed piprites, Piprites griseiceps; Black-capped piprites, Piprites pileata
	Phyllomyias Cabanis & Heine, 1859	Planalto tyrannulet, Phyllomyias fasciatus; Yungas tyrannulet, Phyllomyias weedeni; Greenish tyrannulet, Phyllomyias virescens; Reiser's tyrannulet, Phyllomyias reiseri; Urich's tyrannulet, Phyllomyias urichi; Sclater's tyrannulet, Phyllomyias sclateri; Grey-capped tyrannulet, Phyllomyias griseocapilla; Sooty-headed tyrannulet, Phyllomyias griseiceps; Plumbeous-crowned tyrannulet, Phyllomyias plumbeiceps
	Acrochordopus Berlepsch & Hellmayr, 1905	Rough-legged tyrannulet, Acrochordopus burmeisteri; White-fronted tyrannulet, Acrochordopus zeledoni
	Tyranniscus Cabanis & Heine, 1860	Black-capped tyrannulet, Tyranniscus nigrocapillus; Ashy-headed tyrannulet, Tyranniscus cinereiceps; Tawny-rumped tyrannulet, Tyranniscus uropygialis
	Tyrannulus Vieillot, 1816	Yellow-crowned tyrannulet,Tyrannulus elatus
	Myiopagis Salvin & Godman, 1888	Gray-headed elaenia, Myiopagis caniceps; Choco elaenia, Myiopagis parambae; Amazonian elaenia, Myiopagis cinerea; Jamaican elaenia, Myiopagis cotta; Yellow-crowned elaenia, Myiopagis flavivertex; Forest elaenia, Myiopagis gaimardii; Foothill elaenia, Myiopagis olallai; Pacific elaenia, Myiopagis subplacens; Greenish elaenia, Myiopagis viridicata
	Elaenia Sundevall, 1836	Yellow-bellied elaenia, Elaenia flavogaster; Caribbean elaenia, Elaenia martinica; Large elaenia, Elaenia spectabilis; Noronha elaenia, Elaenia ridleyana; White-crested elaenia, Elaenia albiceps; Chilean elaenia, Elaenia chilensis; Small-billed elaenia, Elaenia parvirostris; Olivaceous elaenia, Elaenia mesoleuca; Slaty elaenia, Elaenia strepera; Mottle-backed elaenia, Elaenia gigas; Brownish elaenia, Elaenia pelzelni; Plain-crested elaenia, Elaenia cristata; Lesser elaenia, Elaenia chiriquensis; Coopmans's elaenia, Elaenia brachyptera; Rufous-crowned elaenia, Elaenia ruficeps; Mountain elaenia, Elaenia frantzii; Highland elaenia, Elaenia obscura; Small-headed elaenia, Elaenia sordida; Great elaenia, Elaenia dayi; Sierran elaenia, Elaenia pallatangae; Tepui elaenia, Elaenia olivina; Greater Antillean elaenia, Elaenia fallax
	Ornithion Hartlaub, 1853	Brown-capped tyrannulet, Ornithion brunneicapillus; White-lored tyrannulet, Ornithion inerme; Yellow-bellied tyrannulet, Ornithion semiflavum
	Camptostoma P.L. Sclater, 1857	Cauca beardless tyrannulet, Camptostoma caucae; Pacific beardless tyrannulet, Camptostoma sclateri; Northern beardless tyrannulet, Camptostoma imberbe; Venezuelan beardless tyrannulet, Camptostoma pusillum; Panama beardless tyrannulet, Camptostoma flaviventre; Amazonian beardless tyrannulet, Camptostoma napaeum; Southeastern beardless tyrannulet, Camptostoma obsoletum
	Suiriri d'Orbigny, 1840	Suiriri flycatcher, Suiriri suiriri
	Mecocerculus P.L. Sclater, 1862	White-throated tyrannulet, Mecocerculus leucophrys; White-tailed tyrannulet, Mecocerculus poecilocercus; Buff-banded tyrannulet, Mecocerculus hellmayri; Rufous-winged tyrannulet, Mecocerculus calopterus; Sulphur-bellied tyrannulet, Mecocerculus minor; White-banded tyrannulet, Mecocerculus stictopterus
	Anairetes Reichenbach, 1850	Ash-breasted tit-tyrant, Anairetes alpinus; Black-crested tit-tyrant, Anairetes nigrocristatus; Pied-crested tit-tyrant, Anairetes reguloides; Yellow-billed tit-tyrant, Anairetes flavirostris; Juan Fernández tit-tyrant, Anairetes fernandezianus; Tufted tit-tyrant, Anairetes parulus
	Uromyias Hellmayr, 1927	Agile tit-tyrant, Uromyias agilis; Unstreaked tit-tyrant, Uromyias agraphia
	Serpophaga Gould, 1839	Torrent tyrannulet, Serpophaga cinerea; River tyrannulet, Serpophaga hypoleuca; Sooty tyrannulet, Serpophaga nigricans; White-crested tyrannulet, Serpophaga subcristata; Straneck's tyrannulet, Serpophaga griseicapilla
	Nesotriccus Townsend, CH, 1895	Mouse-colored tyrannulet, Nesotriccus murinus; Cocos tyrannulet, Nesotriccus ridgwayi; Tumbesian tyrannulet, Nesotriccus tumbezanus; Maranon tyrannulet, Nesotriccus maranonicus
	Capsiempis Cabanis & Heine, 1859	Yellow tyrannulet, Capsiempis flaveola
	Polystictus Reichenbach, 1850	Bearded tachuri, Polystictus pectoralis; Grey-backed tachuri, Polystictus superciliaris
	Pseudocolopteryx Lillo, 1905	Crested doradito, Pseudocolopteryx sclateri; Subtropical doradito, Pseudocolopteryx acutipennis; Dinelli's doradito, Pseudocolopteryx dinelliana; Warbling doradito, Pseudocolopteryx flaviventris; Ticking doradito, Pseudocolopteryx citreola
	Pseudotriccus Taczanowski & Berlepsch, 1885	Bronze-olive pygmy tyrant, Pseudotriccus pelzelni; Rufous-headed pygmy tyrant, Pseudotriccus ruficeps; Hazel-fronted pygmy tyrant, Pseudotriccus simplex
	Corythopis Sundevall, 1836	Ringed antpipit, Corythopis torquatus; Southern antpipit, Corythopis delalandi
	Euscarthmus Wied-Neuwied, 1831	Fulvous-crowned scrub tyrant, Euscarthmus meloryphus; Fulvous-faced scrub tyrant, Euscarthmus fulviceps; Rufous-sided scrub tyrant, Euscarthmus rufomarginatus
	Pseudelaenia W. Lanyon, 1988	Grey-and-white tyrannulet, Pseudelaenia leucospodia
	Stigmatura Sclater & Salvin, 1866	Lesser wagtail-tyrant, Stigmatura napensis; Bahia wagtail-tyrant, Stigmatura bahiae; Greater wagtail-tyrant, Stigmatura budytoides; Caatinga wagtail-tyrant, Stigmatura (budytoides) gracilis
	Zimmerius Traylor, 1977	Guatemalan tyrannulet, Zimmerius vilissimus; Mistletoe tyrannulet, Zimmerius parvus; Spectacled tyrannulet, Zimmerius improbus; Venezuelan tyrannulet, Zimmerius petersi; Bolivian tyrannulet, Zimmerius bolivianus; Red-billed tyrannulet, Zimmerius cinereicapilla; Mishana tyrannulet, Zimmerius villarejoi; Chico's tyrannulet, Zimmerius chicomendesi; Slender-footed tyrannulet, Zimmerius gracilipes; Guianan tyrannulet, Zimmerius acer; Golden-faced tyrannulet Zimmerius chrysops; Coopmans's tyrannulet, Zimmerius minimus; Choco tyrannulet, Zimmerius albigularis; Loja tyrannulet, Zimmerius flavidifrons; Peruvian tyrannulet, Zimmerius viridiflavus
	Pogonotriccus Cabanis & Heine, 1859	Variegated bristle tyrant, Pogonotriccus poecilotis; Chapman's bristle tyrant, Pogonotriccus chapmani; Marble-faced bristle tyrant, Pogonotriccus ophthalmicus; Spectacled bristle tyrant, Pogonotriccus orbitalis; Venezuelan bristle tyrant, Pogonotriccus venezuelanus; Antioquia bristle tyrant, Pogonotriccus lanyoni; Southern bristle tyrant, Pogonotriccus eximius; São Paulo bristle tyrant, Pogonotriccus paulista; Serra do Mar bristle tyrant, Pogonotriccus difficilis
	Phylloscartes Cabanis & Heine, 1859	Mottle-cheeked tyrannulet, Phylloscartes ventralis; Alagoas tyrannulet, Phylloscartes ceciliae; Restinga tyrannulet, Phylloscartes kronei; Bahia tyrannulet, Phylloscartes beckeri; Panama tyrannulet, Phylloscartes flavovirens; Olive-green tyrannulet, Phylloscartes virescens; Ecuadorian tyrannulet, Phylloscartes gualaquizae; Black-fronted tyrannulet, Phylloscartes nigrifrons; Rufous-browed tyrannulet, Phylloscartes superciliaris; Rufous-lored tyrannulet, Phylloscartes flaviventris; Cinnamon-faced tyrannulet, Phylloscartes parkeri; Minas Gerais tyrannulet, Phylloscartes roquettei; Oustalet's tyrannulet, Phylloscartes oustaleti; Bay-ringed tyrannulet, Phylloscartes sylviolus
	Mionectes Cabanis, 1844	Streak-necked flycatcher, Mionectes striaticollis; Olive-striped flycatcher, Mionectes galbinus; Olive-streaked flycatcher, Mionectes olivaceus; Ochre-bellied flycatcher, Mionectes oleagineus; McConnell's flycatcher, Mionectes macconnelli; Sierra de Lema flycatcher, Mionectes roraimae; Grey-hooded flycatcher, Mionectes rufiventris
	Leptopogon Cabanis, 1844	Rufous-breasted flycatcher, Leptopogon rufipectus; Inca flycatcher, Leptopogon taczanowskii; Sepia-capped flycatcher, Leptopogon amaurocephalus; Slaty-capped flycatcher, Leptopogon superciliaris
	Guyramemua Lopes et al., 2017	Chapada flycatcher, Guyramemua affine
	Sublegatus Sclater & Salvin, 1868	Northern scrub flycatcher, Sublegatus arenarum; Southern scrub flycatcher, Sublegatus modestus; Amazonian scrub flycatcher, Sublegatus obscurior
	Inezia Cherrie, 1909	Slender-billed inezia, Inezia tenuirostris; Plain inezia, Inezia inornata; Amazonian inezia, Inezia subflava; Pale-tipped inezia, Inezia caudata
	Myiophobus Reichenbach, 1850	Olive-chested flycatcher, Myiophobus cryptoxanthus; Flavescent flycatcher, Myiophobus flavicans; Unadorned flycatcher, Myiophobus inornatus; Orange-crested flycatcher, Myiophobus phoenicomitra; Roraiman flycatcher, Myiophobus roraimae; Bran-colored flycatcher, Myiophobus fasciatus; Mouse-gray flycatcher, Myiophobus crypterythrus; Rufescent flycatcher, Myiophobus rufescens
	Nephelomyias (Ohlson, Fjeldsa and Ericson, 2009)	Orange-banded flycatcher, Nephelomyias lintoni; Ochraceous-breasted flycatcher, Nephelomyias ochraceiventris; Handsome flycatcher, Nephelomyias pulcher
	Myiotriccus Ridgway, 1905	Ornate flycatcher, Myiotriccus ornatus
	Tachuris Lafresnaye, 1836	Many-colored rush tyrant, Tachuris rubrigastra
	Culicivora Swainson, 1827	Sharp-tailed grass tyrant, Culicivora caudacuta
	Hemitriccus Cabanis & Heine, 1859	Snethlage's tody-tyrant, Hemitriccus minor; Boat-billed tody-tyrant, Hemitriccus josephinae; Flammulated bamboo tyrant, Hemitriccus flammulatus; Drab-breasted bamboo tyrant, Hemitriccus diops; Brown-breasted bamboo tyrant, Hemitriccus obsoletus; White-eyed tody-tyrant, Hemitriccus zosterops; Zimmer's tody-tyrant, Hemitriccus minimus; Eye-ringed tody-tyrant, Hemitriccus orbitatus; Johannes's tody-tyrant, Hemitriccus iohannis; Stripe-necked tody-tyrant, Hemitriccus striaticollis; Hangnest tody-tyrant, Hemitriccus nidipendulus; Yungas tody-tyrant, Hemitriccus spodiops; Pearly-vented tody-tyrant, Hemitriccus margaritaceiventer; Pelzeln's tody-tyrant, Hemitriccus inornatus; Black-throated tody-tyrant, Hemitriccus granadensis; Buff-throated tody-tyrant, Hemitriccus rufigularis; Cinnamon-breasted tody-tyrant, Hemitriccus cinnamomeipectus; Buff-breasted tody-tyrant, Hemitriccus mirandae; Kaempfer's tody-tyrant, Hemitriccus kaempferi; Fork-tailed tody-tyrant, Hemitriccus furcatus; White-bellied tody-tyrant, Hemitriccus griseipectus; Acre tody-tyrant, Hemitriccus cohnhafti
	Myiornis Bertoni, A.W., 1901	White-bellied pygmy tyrant, Myiornis albiventris; Eared pygmy tyrant, Myiornis auricularis; Black-capped pygmy tyrant, Myiornis atricapillus; Short-tailed pygmy tyrant, Myiornis ecaudatus
	Oncostoma P.L. Sclater, 1862	Northern bentbill, Oncostoma cinereigulare; Southern bentbill, Oncostoma olivaceum
	Lophotriccus Berlepsch, 1884	Scale-crested pygmy tyrant, Lophotriccus pileatus; Double-banded pygmy tyrant, Lophotriccus vitiosus; Long-crested pygmy tyrant, Lophotriccus eulophotes; Helmeted pygmy tyrant, Lophotriccus galeatus
	Atalotriccus Ridgway, 1905	Pale-eyed pygmy tyrant, Atalotriccus pilaris
	Poecilotriccus Berlepsch, 1884	Rufous-crowned tody-flycatcher, Poecilotriccus ruficeps; Lulu's tody-flycatcher, Poecilotriccus luluae; White-cheeked tody-flycatcher, Poecilotriccus albifacies; Black-and-white tody-flycatcher, Poecilotriccus capitalis; Buff-cheeked tody-flycatcher, Poecilotriccus senex; Ruddy tody-flycatcher, Poecilotriccus russatus; Ochre-faced tody-flycatcher, Poecilotriccus plumbeiceps; Smoky-fronted tody-flycatcher, Poecilotriccus fumifrons; Rusty-fronted tody-flycatcher, Poecilotriccus latirostris; Slaty-headed tody-flycatcher, Poecilotriccus sylvia; Golden-winged tody-flycatcher, Poecilotriccus calopterus; Black-backed tody-flycatcher, Poecilotriccus pulchellus
	Taeniotriccus Berlepsch & Hartert, 1902	Black-chested tyrant, Taeniotriccus andrei
	Todirostrum – typical tody-flycatchers Lesson, 1831	Spotted tody-flycatcher, Todirostrum maculatum; Yellow-lored tody-flycatcher or grey-headed tody-flycatcher, Todirostrum poliocephalum; Maracaibo tody-flycatcher, Todirostrum viridanum; Black-headed tody-flycatcher, Todirostrum nigriceps; Painted tody-flycatcher, Todirostrum pictum; Common tody-flycatcher or black-fronted tody-flycatcher, Todirostrum cinereum; Yellow-browed tody-flycatcher, Todirostrum chrysocrotaphum
	Cnipodectes P.L. Sclater & Salvin, 1873	Brownish twistwing, Cnipodectes subbrunneus; Rufous twistwing, Cnipodectes superrufus
	Rhynchocyclus Cabanis & Heine, 1859	Eye-ringed flatbill, Rhynchocyclus brevirostris; Pacific flatbill, Rhynchocyclus pacificus; Eastern olivaceous flatbill, Rhynchocyclus olivaceus; Western olivaceous flatbill, Rhynchocyclus aequinoctialis; Fulvous-breasted flatbill, Rhynchocyclus fulvipectus
	Tolmomyias Hellmayr, 1927	Yellow-olive flatbill, Tolmomyias sulphurescens; Orange-eyed flatbill, Tolmomyias traylori; Yellow-margined flatbill, Tolmomyias assimilis; Yellow-winged flatbill, Tolmomyias flavotectus; Grey-crowned flatbill, Tolmomyias poliocephalus; Ochre-lored flatbill, Tolmomyias flaviventris; Olive-faced flatbill, Tolmomyias viridiceps
	Calyptura Swainson, 1832	Kinglet calyptura, Calyptura cristata
	Platyrinchus Desmarest, 1805	Cinnamon-crested spadebill, Platyrinchus saturatus; Stub-tailed spadebill, Platyrinchus cancrominus; Yellow-throated spadebill, Platyrinchus flavigularis; Golden-crowned spadebill, Platyrinchus coronatus; White-throated spadebill, Platyrinchus mystaceus; White-crested spadebill, Platyrinchus platyrhynchos; Russet-winged spadebill, Platyrinchus leucoryphus
	Neopipo Sclater & Salvin, 1869	Cinnamon manakin-tyrant, Neopipo cinnamomea
	Pyrrhomyias Cabanis & Heine, 1859	Cinnamon flycatcher, Pyrrhomyias cinnamomeus
	Hirundinea Orbigny & Lafresnaye, 1837	Cliff flycatcher, Hirundinea ferruginea
	Lathrotriccus Lanyon, W & Lanyon, S, 1986	Euler's flycatcher, Lathrotriccus euleri; Grenadan Euler's flycatcher, Lathrotriccus euleri flaviventris; extinct (early 1950s); Grey-breasted flycatcher, Lathrotriccus griseipectus
	Aphanotriccus Ridgway, 1905	Tawny-chested flycatcher or Salvin's flycatcher, Aphanotriccus capitalis; Black-billed flycatcher or Nelson's flycatcher, Aphanotriccus audax
	Cnemotriccus Hellmayr, 1927	Fuscous flycatcher, Cnemotriccus fuscatus
	Xenotriccus Dwight & Griscom, 1927	Belted flycatcher, Xenotriccus callizonus; Pileated flycatcher, Xenotriccus mexicanus
	Sayornis – phoebes Bonaparte, 1854	Eastern phoebe, Sayornis phoebe; Black phoebe, Sayornis nigricans; Say's phoebe, Sayornis saya
	Mitrephanes Coues, 1882	Northern tufted flycatcher, Mitrephanes phaeocercus; Olive tufted flycatcher, Mitrephanes olivaceus
	Contopus Cabanis, 1855	Olive-sided flycatcher, Contopus cooperi; Greater pewee, Contopus pertinax; Dark pewee, Contopus lugubris; Smoke-colored pewee, Contopus fumigatus; Ochraceous pewee, Contopus ochraceus; Western wood pewee, Contopus sordidulus; Eastern wood pewee, Contopus virens; Northern tropical pewee, Contopus bogotensis; Southern tropical pewee, Contopus cinereus; Tumbes pewee, Contopus punensis; White-throated pewee, Contopus albogularis; Blackish pewee, Contopus nigrescens; Cuban pewee, Contopus caribaeus; Hispaniolan pewee, Contopus hispaniolensis; Jamaican pewee, Contopus pallidus; Lesser Antillean pewee, Contopus latirostris
	Empidonax Cabanis, 1855	Yellow-bellied flycatcher, Empidonax flaviventris; Acadian flycatcher, Empidonax virescens; Alder flycatcher, Empidonax alnorum; Willow flycatcher, Empidonax traillii; White-throated flycatcher, Empidonax albigularis; Least flycatcher, Empidonax minimus; Hammond's flycatcher, Empidonax hammondii; American grey flycatcher, Empidonax wrightii; American dusky flycatcher, Empidonax oberholseri; Pine flycatcher, Empidonax affinis; Western flycatcher, Empidonax difficilis; Yellowish flycatcher, Empidonax flavescens; Buff-breasted flycatcher, Empidonax fulvifrons; Black-capped flycatcher, Empidonax atriceps
	Pyrocephalus Gould, 1839	Scarlet flycatcher, Pyrocephalus rubinus; Vermilion flycatcher, Pyrocephalus obscurus; Darwin's flycatcher, Pyrocephalus nanus; †San Cristóbal flycatcher, Pyrocephalus dubius
	Ochthornis P.L. Sclater, 1888	Drab water tyrant, Ochthornis littoralis
	Satrapa Strickland, 1844	Yellow-browed tyrant, Satrapa icterophrys
	Syrtidicola Chesser et al, 2020	Little ground tyrant, Syrtidicola fluviatilis
	Muscisaxicola – ground tyrants Orbigny & Lafresnaye, 1837	Spot-billed ground tyrant, Muscisaxicola maculirostris; White-fronted ground tyrant, Muscisaxicola albifrons; Ochre-naped ground tyrant, Muscisaxicola flavinucha; Paramo ground tyrant, Muscisaxicola alpinus; Taczanowski's ground tyrant, Muscisaxicola griseus; Cinereous ground tyrant, Muscisaxicola cinereus; Rufous-naped ground tyrant, Muscisaxicola rufivertex; Dark-faced ground tyrant, Muscisaxicola maclovianus; White-browed ground tyrant, Muscisaxicola albilora; Cinnamon-bellied ground tyrant, Muscisaxicola capistratus; Puna ground tyrant, Muscisaxicola juninensis; Black-fronted ground tyrant, Muscisaxicola frontalis
	Lessonia Swainson, 1832	Andean negrito, Lessonia oreas; Austral negrito, Lessonia rufa
	Hymenops Lesson, 1828	Spectacled tyrant, Hymenops perspicillatus
	Knipolegus F. Boie, 1826	Blue-billed black tyrant, Knipolegus cyanirostris; Jelski's black tyrant, Knipolegus signatus; Plumbeous tyrant, Knipolegus cabanisi; Cinereous tyrant, Knipolegus striaticeps; White-winged black tyrant, Knipolegus aterrimus; Hudson's black tyrant, Knipolegus hudsoni; Rufous-tailed tyrant, Knipolegus poecilurus; Riverside tyrant, Knipolegus orenocensis; Amazonian black tyrant, Knipolegus poecilocercus; Crested black tyrant, Knipolegus lophotes; Velvety black tyrant, Knipolegus nigerrimus; Sao Francisco black tyrant or Caatinga black tyrant, Knipolegus franciscanus
	Cnemarchus Ridgway, 1905	Red-rumped bush tyrant, Cnemarchus erythropygius; Rufous-webbed bush tyrant, Cnemarchus rufipennis
	Xolmis F. Boie, 1826	White-rumped monjita, Xolmis velatus; White monjita, Xolmis irupero
	Pyrope Cabanis & Heine, 1860	Fire-eyed diucon, Pyrope pyrope
	Nengetus Swainson, 1827	Grey monjita, Nengetus cinereus
	Neoxolmis Hellmayr, 1927	Black-crowned monjita, Neoxolmis coronatus; Rusty-backed monjita, Neoxolmis rubetra; Salinas monjita, Neoxolmis salinarum; Chocolate-vented tyrant, Neoxolmis rufiventris
	Myiotheretes Reichenbach, 1850	Streak-throated bush tyrant, Myiotheretes striaticollis; Rufous-bellied bush tyrant, Myiotheretes fuscorufus; Santa Marta bush tyrant, Myiotheretes pernix; Smoky bush tyrant, Myiotheretes fumigatus
	Agriornis – shrike-tyrants Gould, 1839	Black-billed shrike-tyrant, Agriornis montanus; Lesser shrike-tyrant, Agriornis murinus; White-tailed shrike-tyrant, Agriornis albicauda; Grey-bellied shrike-tyrant, Agriornis micropterus; Great shrike-tyrant, Agriornis lividus
	Gubernetes Such, 1825	Streamer-tailed tyrant, Gubernetes yetapa
	Muscipipra Lesson, 1831	Shear-tailed grey tyrant, Muscipipra vetula
	Fluvicola Swainson, 1827	Pied water tyrant, Fluvicola pica; Black-backed water tyrant, Fluvicola albiventer; Masked water tyrant, Fluvicola nengeta
	Arundinicola d'Orbigny, 1840	White-headed marsh tyrant, Arundinicola leucocephala
	Heteroxolmis Lanyon, W, 1986	Black-and-white monjita, Heteroxolmis dominicana
	Alectrurus Vieillot, 1816	Cock-tailed tyrant, Alectrurus tricolor; Strange-tailed tyrant, Alectrurus risora
	Silvicultrix Lanyon, W, 1986	Crowned chat-tyrant, Silvicultrix frontalis; Kalinowski's chat-tyrant, Silvicultrix spodionota; Golden-browed chat-tyrant, Silvicultrix pulchella; Yellow-bellied chat-tyrant, Silvicultrix diadema; Jelski's chat-tyrant, Silvicultrix jelskii
	Ochthoeca Cabanis, 1847	Tumbes tyrant, Ochthoeca salvini; Slaty-backed chat-tyrant, Ochthoeca cinnamomeiventris; Blackish chat-tyrant, Ochthoeca nigrita; Maroon-belted chat-tyrant, Ochthoeca thoracica; Rufous-breasted chat-tyrant, Ochthoeca rufipectoralis; Brown-backed chat-tyrant, Ochthoeca fumicolor; Rufous-browed chat-tyrant, Ochthoeca superciliosa; D'Orbigny's chat-tyrant, Ochthoeca oenanthoides; White-browed chat-tyrant, Ochthoeca leucophrys; Piura chat-tyrant, Ochthoeca piurae
	Colorhamphus Sundevall, 1872	Patagonian tyrant, Colorhamphus parvirostris
	Colonia	Long-tailed tyrant, Colonia colonus
	Muscigralla Orbigny & Lafresnaye, 1837	Short-tailed field tyrant, Muscigralla brevicauda
	Machetornis G.R. Gray, 1841	Cattle tyrant, Machetornis rixosa
	Legatus P.L. Sclater, 1859	Piratic flycatcher, Legatus leucophaius
	Phelpsia W. Lanyon, 1984	White-bearded flycatcher, Phelpsia inornata
	Myiozetetes P.L. Sclater, 1859	Rusty-margined flycatcher, Myiozetetes cayanensis; Social flycatcher, Myiozetetes similis; Grey-capped flycatcher, Myiozetetes granadensis; Dusky-chested flycatcher, Myiozetetes luteiventris
	Pitangus Swainson, 1827	Great kiskadee, Pitangus sulphuratus
	Philohydor Lanyon, W, 1984	Lesser kiskadee, Philohydor lictor; P. l. panamensis (Bangs & Penard, TE, 1918); P. l. lictor (Lichtenstein, MHK, 1823)
	Conopias Cabanis & Heine, 1859	White-ringed flycatcher, Conopias albovittatus; Three-striped flycatcher, Conopias trivirgatus; Yellow-throated flycatcher, Conopias parvus; Lemon-browed flycatcher, Conopias cinchoneti
	Myiodynastes Bonaparte, 1857	Golden-bellied flycatcher, Myiodynastes hemichrysus; Golden-crowned flycatcher, Myiodynastes chrysocephalus; Baird's flycatcher, Myiodynastes bairdii; Sulphur-bellied flycatcher, Myiodynastes luteiventris; Streaked flycatcher, Myiodynastes maculatus
	Megarynchus Thunberg, 1824	Boat-billed flycatcher, Megarynchus pitangua
	Tyrannopsis Ridgway, 1905	Sulphury flycatcher, Tyrannopsis sulphurea
	Empidonomus Cabanis & Heine, 1859	Variegated flycatcher, Empidonomus varius; Crowned slaty flycatcher, Empidonomus aurantioatrocristatus
	Tyrannus Lacépède, 1799	Snowy-throated kingbird, Tyrannus niveigularis; White-throated kingbird, Tyrannus albogularis; Tropical kingbird, Tyrannus melancholicus; Couch's kingbird, Tyrannus couchii; Cassin's kingbird, Tyrannus vociferans; Thick-billed kingbird, Tyrannus crassirostris; Western kingbird, Tyrannus verticalis; Scissor-tailed flycatcher, Tyrannus forficatus; Fork-tailed flycatcher, Tyrannus savana; Eastern kingbird, Tyrannus tyrannus; Gray kingbird, Tyrannus dominicensis; Giant kingbird, Tyrannus cubensis; Loggerhead kingbird, Tyrannus caudifasciatus
	Rhytipterna Reichenbach, 1850	Pale-bellied mourner, Rhytipterna immunda; Greyish mourner, Rhytipterna simplex; Rufous mourner, Rhytipterna holerythra
	Sirystes Cabanis & Heine, 1859	Sibilant sirystes, Sirystes sibilator; Western sirystes, Sirystes albogriseus; White-rumped sirystes, Sirystes albocinereus; Todd's sirystes, Sirystes subcanescens
	Casiornis Des Murs, 1856	Rufous casiornis, Casiornis rufus; Ash-throated casiornis, Casiornis fuscus
	Myiarchus Cabanis, 1844	Rufous flycatcher, Myiarchus semirufus; Yucatan flycatcher, Myiarchus yucatanensis; Sad flycatcher, Myiarchus barbirostris; Dusky-capped flycatcher, Myiarchus tuberculifer; Swainson's flycatcher, Myiarchus swainsoni; Venezuelan flycatcher, Myiarchus venezuelensis; Panama flycatcher, Myiarchus panamensis; Short-crested flycatcher, Myiarchus ferox; Pale-edged flycatcher, Myiarchus cephalotes; Sooty-crowned flycatcher, Myiarchus phaeocephalus; Apical flycatcher, Myiarchus apicalis; Ash-throated flycatcher, Myiarchus cinerascens; Nutting's flycatcher, Myiarchus nuttingi; Great crested flycatcher, Myiarchus crinitus; Brown-crested flycatcher, Myiarchus tyrannulus; Grenada flycatcher, Myiarchus nugator; Galapagos flycatcher, Myiarchus magnirostris; Rufous-tailed flycatcher, Myiarchus validus; La Sagra's flycatcher, Myiarchus sagrae; Stolid flycatcher, Myiarchus stolidus; Lesser Antillean flycatcher, Myiarchus oberi; Puerto Rican flycatcher, Myiarchus antillarum
	Ramphotrigon G.R. Gray, 1855	Large-headed flatbill, Ramphotrigon megacephalum; Flammulated flycatcher, Ramphotrigon flammulatum; Dusky-tailed flatbill, Ramphotrigon fuscicauda; Rufous-tailed flatbill, Ramphotrigon ruficauda
	Attila Lesson, 1831	Rufous-tailed attila, Attila phoenicurus; Cinnamon attila, Attila cinnamomeus; Ochraceous attila, Attila torridus; Citron-bellied attila, Attila citriniventris; White-eyed attila, Attila bolivianus; Grey-hooded attila, Attila rufus; Bright-rumped attila, Attila spadiceus

== See also ==
- List of tyrant flycatcher species
