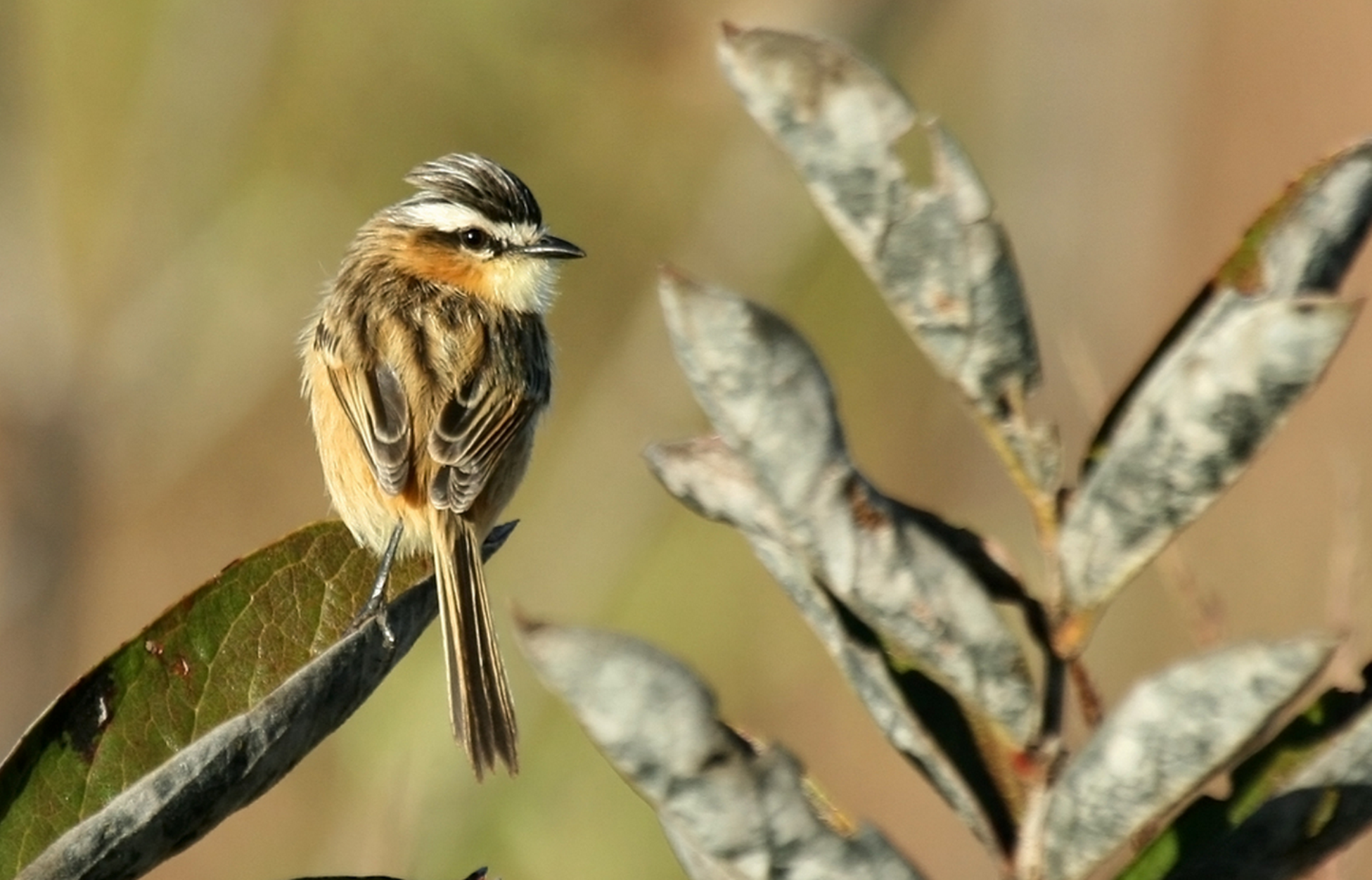

Conservation status
- Least Concern (IUCN 3.1)

Scientific classification
- Kingdom: Animalia
- Phylum: Chordata
- Class: Aves
- Order: Passeriformes
- Family: Tyrannidae
- Genus: Culicivora; Swainson, 1827
- Species: C. caudacuta

Binomial name
- Culicivora caudacuta (Vieillot, 1818)

= Sharp-tailed grass tyrant =

Species of bird

The sharp-tailed grass tyrant or sharp-tailed tyrant (Culicivora caudacuta) is a species of bird in the family Tyrannidae, the tyrant flycatchers. It is found in Argentina, Bolivia, Brazil, Paraguay, and Uruguay.

== Taxonomy and systematics ==
The short-tailed grass tyrant is the only member of its genus and has no subspecies. Its closest relatives are the tachuris of genus Polystictus.

== Description ==
The sharp-tailed grass tyrant is 10 to 11 cm (3.9 to 4.3 in) long. The sexes have almost the same plumage; females are slightly smaller than males with a shorter tail. Adult males have a slightly bushy blackish crown and females a browner one. Both sexes have a wide white supercilium and a thin black line through the eye on an otherwise warm buffy brown face. Their back and rump are buffy brown with wide blackish streaks. Their wings are buffy brown with black and pale buff streaks and edges. Their tail is highly graduated. The central feathers are stiff and most feathers' webs are quickly worn away at the ends, giving the tail a resemblance to those of Synallaxis spinetails. Their chin is white and the rest of their underparts mostly pale yellowish white with a warm cinnamon-buff wash on the flanks. Juveniles are more buffy overall than adults. Both sexes have a dark brown iris, a black bill, and black legs and feet.

== Distribution and habitat ==
The largest part of the sharp-tailed grass tyrant's range is in Brazil in an area roughly bounded by southern Mato Grosso, southern Tocantins, and far northern Santa Catarina. Its range continues west into central Bolivia to La Paz Department and southwest through eastern Paraguay into northern Argentina as far as Santa Fe and Entre Ríos provinces and slightly into Uruguay. Its distribution throughout is rather local. It inhabits grasslands including cerrado, savanna, and wettish and tall native grasslands, and is often found near marshes and small watercourses. It shuns disturbed areas. In elevation it ranges from near sea level to 1,400 m (4,600 ft).

== Behavior ==
=== Movement ===
The sharp-tailed grass tyrant is a year-round resident.

=== Feeding ===
The sharp-tailed grass tyrant feeds mostly on insects and also includes seeds in its diet. It typically forages in pairs or flocks of up to about 10 individuals and occasionally joins mixed-species feeding flocks. It tends to favor areas with weeds and grass clumps that rise above the general vegetative level. It clings to vertical grass and shrub stems and captures prey with sallies to grab or hover-glean from vegetation and to capture in mid-air. It has been observed perching below grass seed heads and feeding like a Carduelis finch.

=== Breeding ===
The sharp-tailed grass tyrant breeds between October and March. Its nest is an open cup made from grasses and other plant fibers, thistle down, and spider web. It usually is placed near the ground in an isolated shrub. The clutch is three eggs. The incubation period, time to fledging, and details of parental care are not known.

=== Vocalization ===
The sharp-tailed grass tyrant's song is "a series of weak, short, ascending burry whistles, 'tweee tweee tweee' " and is thought to be sung only by the male. Its call is "a series of unmusical 'tick' notes".

== Status ==
The IUCN originally in 1988 assessed the sharp-tailed grass tyrant as Threatened, then in 2004 as Vulnerable, and since July 2024 as being of Least Concern. It has a large range; its population size is not known and is believed to be decreasing. "Conversion to soybeans, exportable crops and Eucalyptus plantations (encouraged by government land reform) has severely impacted campo cerrado habitats, with the greatest impact in the southern part of the biome. Grasslands within the range are additionally threatened by extensive cattle ranching." It is considered mostly rare and very localized but occurs in several protected areas.
