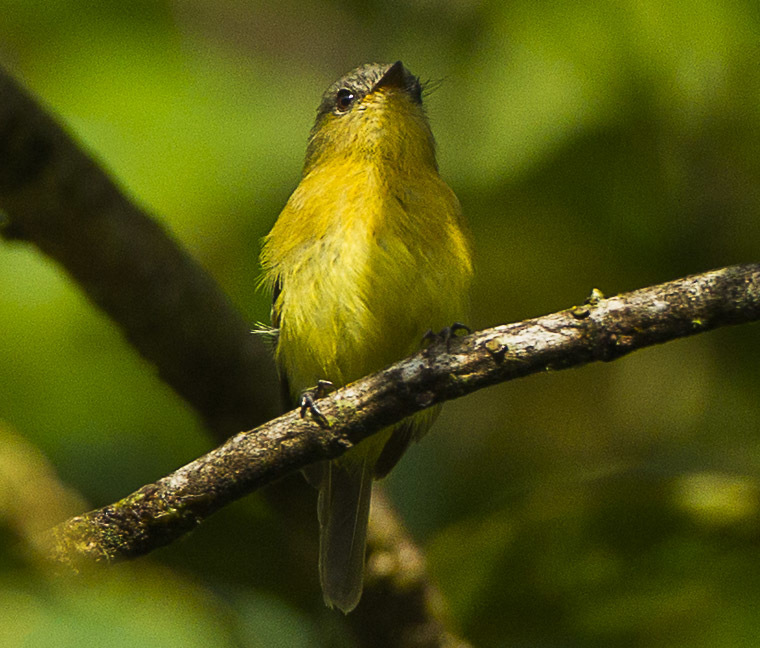

Conservation status
- Least Concern (IUCN 3.1)

Scientific classification
- Kingdom: Animalia
- Phylum: Chordata
- Class: Aves
- Order: Passeriformes
- Family: Tyrannidae
- Genus: Nephelomyias
- Species: N. pulcher

Binomial name
- Nephelomyias pulcher (Sclater, PL, 1861)

Synonyms
- Myiobius pulcher; Myiophobus pulcher

= Handsome flycatcher =

Species of bird

The handsome flycatcher (Nephelomyias pulcher) is a species of bird in the family Tyrannidae, the tyrant flycatchers. It is found in Colombia, Ecuador, Peru, and possibly Bolivia.

== Taxonomy and systematics ==
The handsome flycatcher was originally described as Myiobius pulcher. It was later moved to genus Myiophobus. A study published in 2009 determined that the handsome flycatcher and two other species did not belong there so the genus Nephelomyias was created for them in 2010.

The handsome flycatcher has three subspecies, the nominate N. p. pulcher (Sclater, PL, 1861), N. p. bellus (Sclater, PL, 1862), and N. p. oblitus (Bond, J, 1943).

== Description ==
The handsome flycatcher is 9.5 to 11 cm (3.7 to 4.3 in) long. The sexes very similar. Adult males of the nominate subspecies have an olive gray crown with a partly hidden orange-rufous patch in the middle. Both sexes have a white spot above the lores and a white broken eye-ring on an otherwise olive gray face. Their nape is olive gray and their back and rump are olive. Their wings are dusky with ochre and white edges on the flight feathers and wide pale ochre tips on the wing coverts; the latter show as two wing bars. Their rather short tail is dusky. Their throat and breast are dull ochre-yellow and their belly paler yellow. Adult females have a duller and smaller crown patch or none at all. Subspecies N. p. bellus is slightly larger than the nominate and has darker grayish green upperparts, deeper ochre wing bars, and a deep ochre band across the breast. N. p. oblitus is similar to the nominate but with a darker crown and some buffy edges on the flight feathers. All subspecies have a dark iris, gray legs and feet, and a small bill with a black maxilla and an orange-yellow mandible.

== Distribution and habitat ==
The handsome flycatcher has a disjunct distribution. The nominate subspecies is found on the western slope of the Andes from Valle del Cauca Department in western Colombia south into northwestern Ecuador as far as Cotopaxi Province. Subspecies N. p. bellus has two separate ranges though possibly the species also occurs between them. One is in Colombia's Central and Eastern Andes and south on the eastern Andean slope into northeastern Ecuador as far as Pichincha Province. The other is from Zamora-Chinchipe Province in far southeastern Ecuador and slightly into northern Peru's Cajamarca Department. N. p. oblitus is found on the eastern slope of the Peruvian Andes in Cuzco and Puno departments. In addition, undocumented records of this subspecies in Bolivia lead the South American Classification Committee of the American Ornithological Society to call it hypothetical in that country.

The handsome flycatcher inhabits the interior and edges of humid subtropical forest both primary and secondary. In elevation it ranges between 1,800 and 2,500 m (5,900 and 8,200 ft) in Colombia, between 1,500 and 2,400 m (4,900 and 7,900 ft) in Ecuador, between 2,000 and 2,200 m (6,600 and 7,200 ft) in northern Peru, and between 1,500 and 2,600 m (4,900 and 8,500 ft) in southern Peru.

== Behavior ==
=== Movement ===
The handsome flycatcher is believed to be a year-round resident.

=== Feeding ===
The handsome flycatcher feeds on insects. It typically forages in small groups (possibly families) from the forest's mid-story to its canopy and often joins mixed-species feeding flocks. It takes prey from foliage with short flights to hover-glean and also in mid-air.

=== Breeding ===
The handsome flycatcher's breeding season has not been defined but appears to include February to August in Colombia. Nothing else is known about the species' breeding biology.

=== Vocalization ===
The handsome flycatcher's song is "a rather sharp and clear 'tsi-tsi-tsi' ". Its calls include "a high, thin tsew-tsip", "a descending sputtering trill: tseetsititititititew", and "a high, descending series of ringing notes: TEE-ti-ti-ti".

== Status ==
The IUCN has assessed thehandsome flycatcher as being of Least Concern. It has a large range; its population size is not known and is believed to be decreasing. No immediate threats have been identified. It is considered locally common in Colombia, uncommon in Ecuador and northern Peru, and rare and local in southern Peru. It occurs in at least one protected area in Colombia and several in Ecuador.
