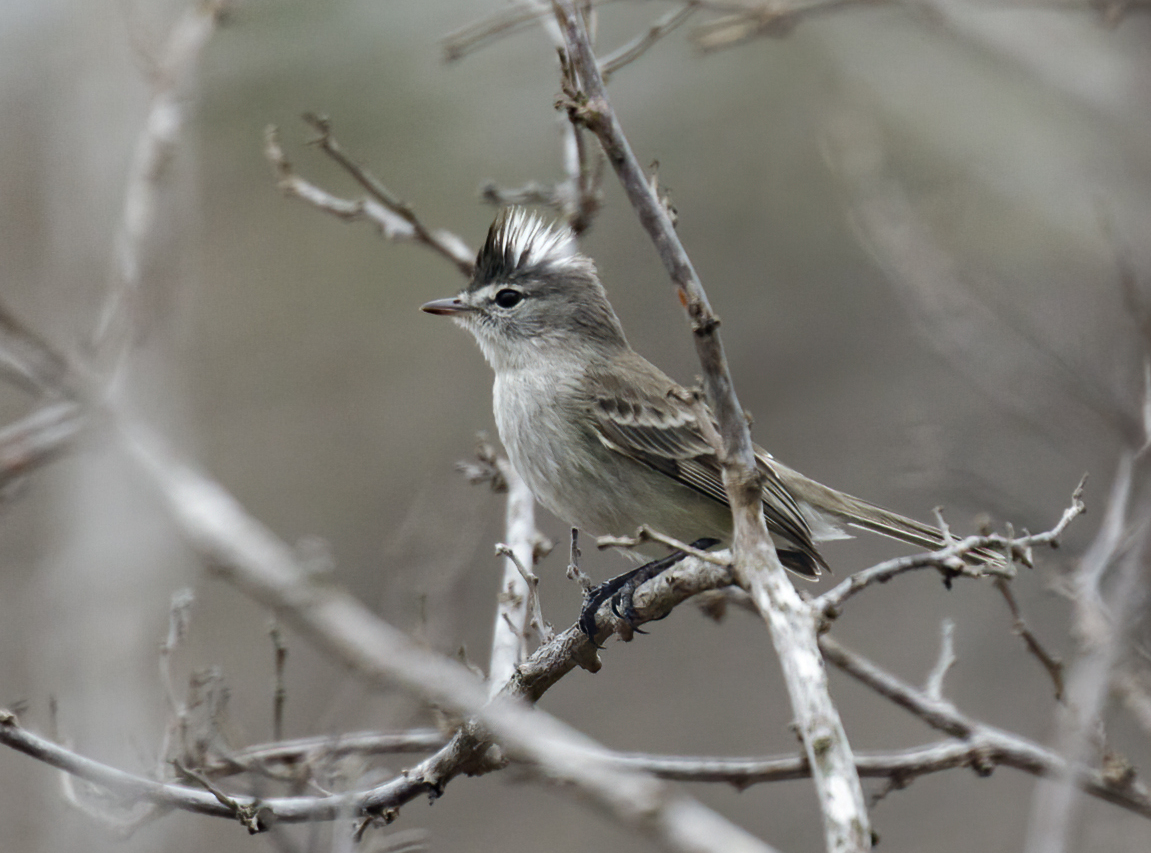

Conservation status
- Least Concern (IUCN 3.1)

Scientific classification
- Kingdom: Animalia
- Phylum: Chordata
- Class: Aves
- Order: Passeriformes
- Family: Tyrannidae
- Genus: Pseudelaenia; W. Lanyon, 1988
- Species: P. leucospodia

Binomial name
- Pseudelaenia leucospodia (Taczanowski, 1877)

Synonyms
- Elainea leucospodia; Myiopagis leucospodia; Phaeomyias leucospodia

= Grey-and-white tyrannulet =

Species of bird

The grey-and-white tyrannulet (Pseudelaenia leucospodia) is a species of bird in the family Tyrannidae, the tyrant flycatchers. It is found in Ecuador and Peru.

== Taxonomy and systematics ==
The grey-and-white tyrannulet was originally described as Elainea leucospodia. Later authors placed it in genera Phaeomyias or Myiopagis, and its original genus was later spelled "Elaenia". A 1986 publication proposed the monotypic genus Pseudelaenia for it. A genetic study published in 2009 confirmed that it belonged there and was not closely related to any of its former genera.

The grey-and-white tyrannulet is monotypic. Some authors suggest that the population in southwestern Ecuador should be treated as subspecies P. l. cinereifrons but it probably cannot be distinguished from the Peruvian population.

== Description ==
The grey-and-white tyrannulet is about 12.5 cm (4.9 in) long and weighs 10 to 11 g (0.35 to 0.39 oz). The sexes have the same plumage. Adults have a pale grayish brown crown with a shaggy crest whose white center is exposed when erect. They have a white supercilium and a black line through the eye on an otherwise grayish white face. Their upperparts are pale grayish brown and their tail gray. Their wings are dusky with narrow white edges on the flight feathers and coverts; they show as wing bars on the latter. Their underparts are mostly whitish with a gray tinge on the flanks and a creamy tinge on the belly. Both sexes have a dark brown iris, a brownish black bill with a pinkish base to the mandible, and gray legs and feet. Juveniles have less white in their crown than adults.

== Distribution and habitat ==
The grey-and-white tyrannulet has a disjunct distribution It is found in southwestern Ecuador on the Isla de la Plata and Isla Puná, on the mainland in Guayas and Loja provinces, and with a single record in Manabí Province. In Peru it is found in the northwest between Tumbes and Ancash departments. It inhabits arid scrublands, brushy riparian areas, and dry forest. In elevation it occurs from sea level to 100 m (300 ft) in Ecuador and to 800 m (2,600 ft) in Peru.

== Behavior ==
=== Movement ===
The grey-and-white tyrannulet is a year-round resident.

=== Feeding ===
The grey-and-white tyrannulet feeds on insects. It forages singly or in pairs, usually near the tops of shrubs. It takes prey by gleaning while perched and by while briefly hovering after a short flight.

=== Breeding ===
The grey-and-white tyrannulet breeds between February and April and often has two broods. Its nest is a deep barrel-shaped cup felted from plant down. It is placed on a branch near the trunk of a thickly branched tree between about 2 and 7 m (7 and 23 ft) above the ground. The clutch is usually three eggs though occasionally two. The incubation period is 16 days and fledging occurs 15 to 17 days after hatch.

=== Vocalization ===
The grey-and-white tyrannulet's dawn song is "a squeaky pit'i'pew or sneezy pit'chew interspersed with a rising weee-wit" and its call is "a squeaky, nasal tchuEE? or tchu'bit".

== Status ==
The IUCN has assessed the grey-and-white tyrannulet as being of Least Concern. It has a large range; its population size is not known and is believed to be decreasing. No immediate threats have been identified. In Ecuador it is considered generally local but abundant on Isla de la Plata and fairly common in Guayas. In Peru it is considered fairly common. It occurs in one protected area in Peru. "Arid habitats within [the] Tumbesian region are adversely affected by cattle grazing and agriculture in valley bottoms, but in general remain in reasonable condition."
