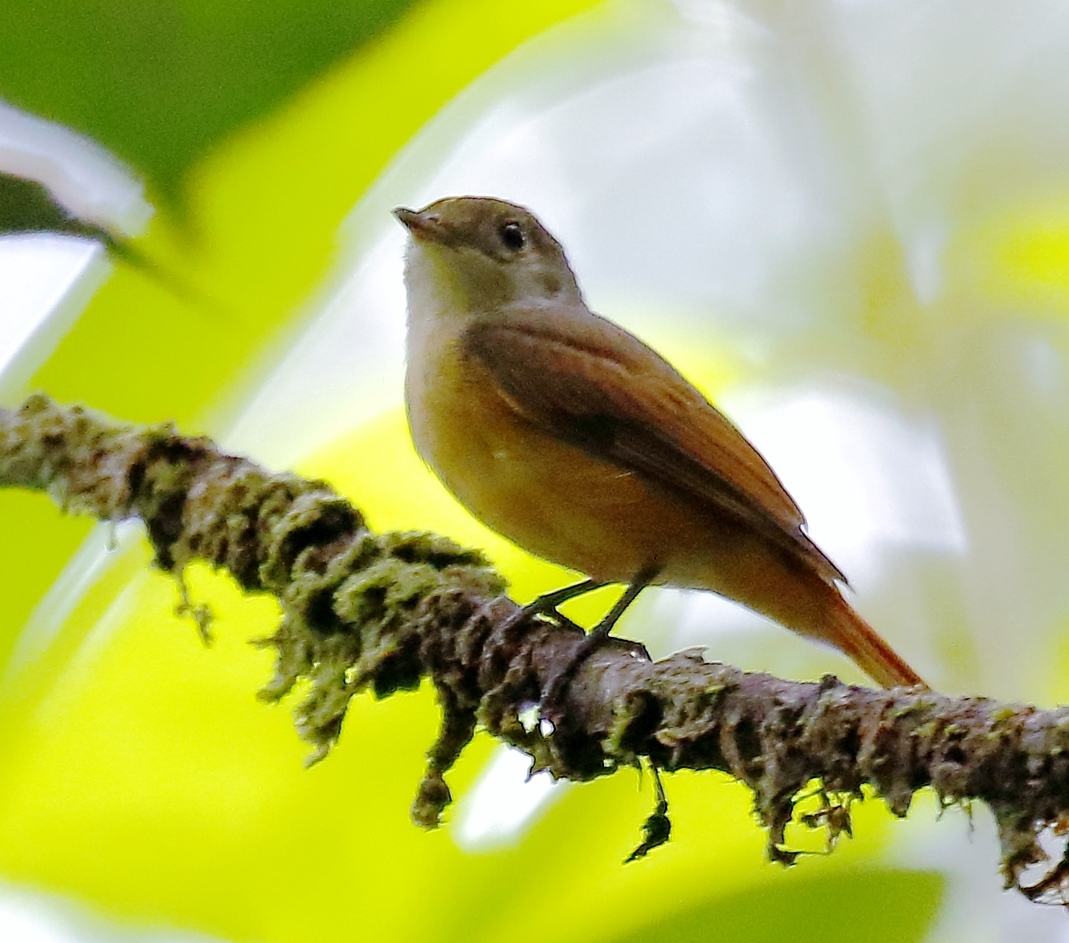
- Cinnamom neopipo at Presidente Figueiredo, Amazonas state, Brazil.

Conservation status
- Least Concern (IUCN 3.1)

Scientific classification
- Kingdom: Animalia
- Phylum: Chordata
- Class: Aves
- Order: Passeriformes
- Family: Tyrannidae
- Genus: Neopipo; Sclater, PL & Salvin, 1869
- Species: N. cinnamomea

Binomial name
- Neopipo cinnamomea (Lawrence, 1869)

= Cinnamon neopipo =

Species of bird

The cinnamon neopipo or cinnamon manakin-tyrant (Neopipo cinnamomea) is a species of bird in the family Tyrannidae, the tyrant flycatchers. It is found in Bolivia, Brazil, Colombia, Ecuador, French Guiana, Guyana, Peru, Suriname, and Venezuela.

== Taxonomy and systematics ==
The cinnamon neopipo has a complicated taxonomic history. It was originally described by George Newbold Lawrence as Pipra cinnamonmea, a member of the manakin family Pipridae. Lawrence "placed this species provisionally in Pipra" though he noted several characteristics not found in others of that genus. By the late twentieth century it had obtained its present genus Neopipo and its placement in the tyrant flycatcher family. It is currently known as both the cinnamon neopipo and the cinnamon manakin-tyrant and was previously called by some authors the cinnamon tyrant.

The cinnamon neopipo is the only member of its genus. It has two subspecies, the nominate N. c. cinnamomea (Lawrence, 1869) and N. c. helenae (Frederick V. McConnell, 1911). However, some authors doubt the validity of helenae.

== Description ==
The cinnamon neopipo is 9.1 to 9.5 cm (3.6 to 3.7 in) long and weighs about 7 g (0.25 oz). The sexes have almost the same plumage though females are duller than males, and the two subspecies have the same plumage. Adult males have a dull gray crown with a partially hidden yellow patch in the center; females have a smaller yellow patch. Both sexes have an otherwise dull gray face, nape, and back. Their lower back and rump are rufous. Their wings are dusky with wide rufous edges on the feathers. Their rather short tail is rufous. Their throat and underparts are buffy to orange-cinnamon; the throat is lighter than the rest. They have a dark iris, a narrow black bill with an orange base to the mandible, and blue-gray or dusky gray legs and feet.

== Distribution and habitat ==
The nominate subspecies of the cinnamon neopipo has by far the larger range of the two. It is found from Putumayo Department in far southern Colombia south very locally through eastern Ecuador and eastern Peru into northwestern Bolivia, from extreme southeastern Guainía Department in eastern Colombia east into central and southern Amazonas state in southern Venezuela, and from those areas into western and southern Amazonian Brazil. It may also occur in southeastern Colombia between the two known areas. Subspecies N. c. helenae is found in the Guianas and northern Brazil to the Atlantic in Amapá. The species inhabits terra firme forest, especially in areas where it grows on white sandy soil. In elevation it ranges from sea level to 1,000 m (3,300 ft) in Brazil. It reaches 400 m (1,300 ft) in Colombia and Ecuador, 700 m (2,300 ft) in Peru, and 200 m (700 ft) in Venezuela.

== Behavior ==
=== Movement ===
The cinnamon neopipo is believed to be a year-round resident.

=== Feeding ===
The cinnamon neopipo feeds on arthropods, though details are lacking. It typically forages singly and seldom joins mixed-species feeding flocks. It typically perches from the forest's mid-level to its subcanopy, and captures prey mostly with short sallies from the perch to grab it from the underside of leaves.

=== Breeding ===
Nothing is known about the cinnamon neopipo's breeding biology.

=== Vocalization ===
The cinnamon neopipo's song is a "long series of extr. high 'fee' notes, 1st few notes slightly rising in pitch and strength, then gradually descending", and lasts five to seven seconds. Its call is a "very high, thin, gliding-down 'seeeu' ".

== Status ==
The IUCN has assessed the cinnamon neopipo as being of Least Concern. It has a very large range; its population size is not known and is believed to be decreasing. No immediate threats have been identified. It is considered "rare and local" in Colombia and Peru, "very rare and local" in Ecuador, and "generally scarce or local" in Venezuela. It occurs in several protected areas. "Much of this species' habitat remains in relatively good condition within its fairly large range, although numbers [are] reduced wherever habitat destruction has taken place."
