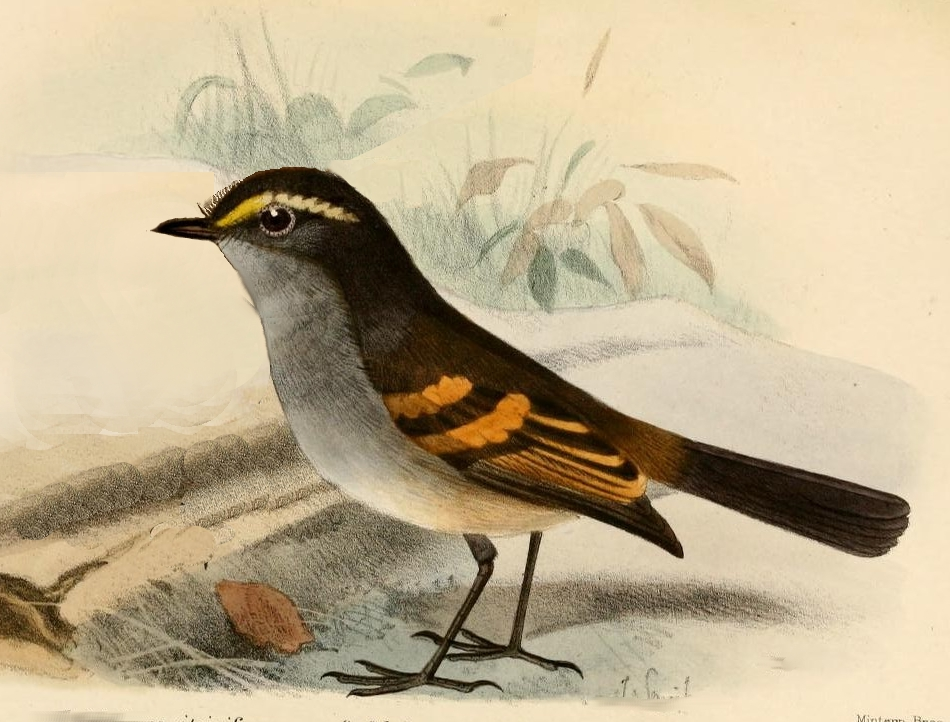
- Illustration by Joseph Smit
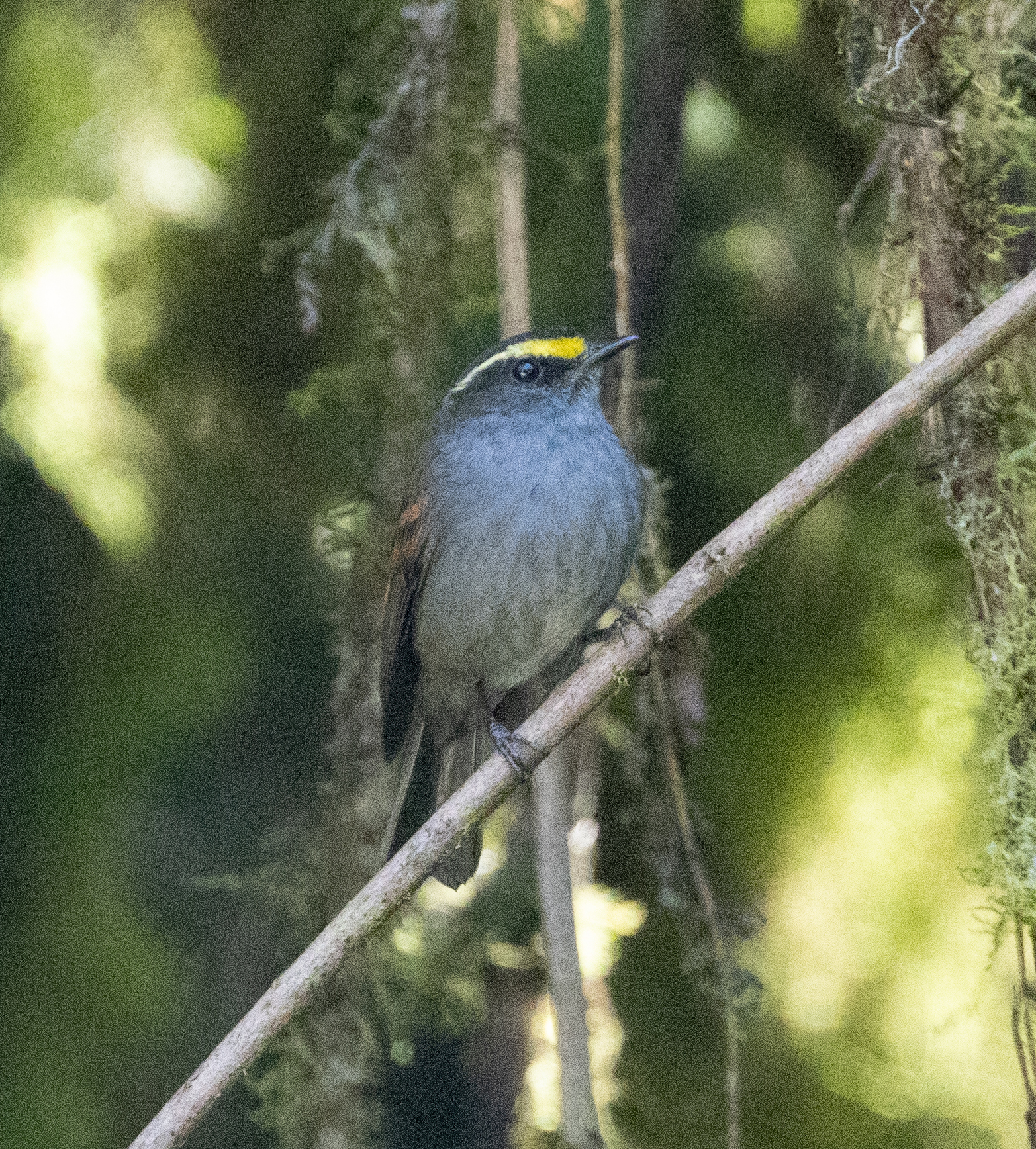

Conservation status
- Least Concern (IUCN 3.1)

Scientific classification
- Kingdom: Animalia
- Phylum: Chordata
- Class: Aves
- Order: Passeriformes
- Family: Tyrannidae
- Genus: Silvicultrix
- Species: S. pulchella

Binomial name
- Silvicultrix pulchella (Sclater, PL & Salvin, 1876)

= Golden-browed chat-tyrant =

Species of bird

The golden-browed chat-tyrant (Silvicultrix pulchella) is a species of passerine bird in the family Tyrannidae, the tyrant flycatchers. It is found in Bolivia and Peru.

== Taxonomy and systematics ==
The golden-browed chat-tyrant has a complicated taxonomic history. It was formally described in 1876 as Ochthoeca pulchlla. For a time it and Jelski's chat-tyrant (now Silvicultrix jelskii) were considered conspecific and later both were treated as subspecies of the crowned chat-tyrant (then Tyrannula frontalis). In 1966 Meyer de Schauensee placed the crowned chat-tyrant in genus Ochthoeca, returning the golden-browed chat-tyrant to its original genus, though still as a subspecies of the crowned chat-tyrant. Wesley Lanyon moved the crowned chat-tyrant to Silvicultrix when he erected that genus in 1986.

By 1990 some authors had elevated the golden-browed chat-tyrant to a full species. By 2006 the IOC had recognized the golden-browed chat-tyrant as a species and then adopted the change in genus to Silvicultrix in 2009. The first version of BirdLife International's Handbook of the Birds of the World (HBW), published in 2007, included the golden-browed chat-tyrant as a full species. The Clements taxonomy and the South American Classification Committee of the American Ornithological Society (SACC) later accepted it as a species. (Note: These sources show that the recognition occurred by their dates. Earlier versions are not available.) HBW adopted the reassignment of the golden-browed chat-tyrant to genus Silvicultrix in 2016, Clements in 2022, and the SACC in 2023.

The golden-browed chat-tyrant has two subspecies, the nominate S. p. pulchella (Sclater, PL & Salvin, 1876) and S. p. similis (Carriker, 1933).

== Description ==
The golden-browed chat-tyrant is 12 to 13 cm (4.7 to 5.1 in) long. The sexes have the same plumage. Adults of the nominate subspecies have a dark gray-brown crown and a golden-yellow forecrown that continues as a supercilium that extends far past the eye on an otherwise dark gray-brown face. Their back is dark brown that becomes more rufescent on the lower back and rump. Their wings are dark brown with rufous tips on the coverts that show as two wide wing bars. Their tail is dark brown. Their throat and breast are dark gray, their belly a lighter gray, their lower flanks rufous-buff, and their crissum gray. Subspecies S. p. similis has somewhat more rufous on the back than the nominate, with an olive wash on the breast, a buffier belly, and an ochraceous crissum. Both subspecies have a dark iris, a black bill, and black legs and feet.

== Distribution and habitat ==
Subspecies S. p. similis of the golden-browed chat-tyrant is the more northerly of the two. It is found only in Peru, on the eastern slope of the Andes between northern Amazonas and Junín departments. The nominate subspecies is found on the eastern slope of the Andes from the Cordillera Vilcabamba in Cuzco and Ayacucho departments south into northwestern and west-central Bolivia. The species inhabits humid montane forest, where it favors scrubby edges, shady ravines, dark thickets, bamboo stands, and mossy areas. In elevation it ranges between 1,800 and 3,100 m (5,900 and 10,200 ft) in Peru and is found down to 1,700 m (5,600 ft) in Bolivia.

== Behavior ==
=== Movement ===
The golden-browed chat-tyrant is a year-round resident.

=== Feeding ===
The golden-browed chat-tyrant feeds on insects. It usually forages singly and occasionally in pairs; it seldom joins mixed-species feeding flocks. It perches inconspicuously near the ground in the forest undergrowth. It takes prey with sallies from the perch to glean and grab it from vegetation and twigs.

=== Breeding ===
The golden-browed chat-tyrant's breeding season has not been defined, but a juvenile was found in Peru in June. Nothing else is known about the species' breeding biology.

=== Vocalization ===
The golden-browed chat-tyrant's principal call is "a long, abruptly rising, then slowly falling, thin, high, trill: WREEzzeeeeerrrrr". It also makes "a rising dzreeeeeee?".

== Status ==
The IUCN has assessed the golden-browed chat-tyrant as being of Least Concern. It has a large range; its population size is not known and is believed to be decreasing. No immediate threats have been identified. It is considered fairly common in Peru. It occurs in all of the protected areas within its range.
