= Chat-tyrant =

Chat-tyrants are found in the following genera:

- Ochthoeca
- Silvicultrix
