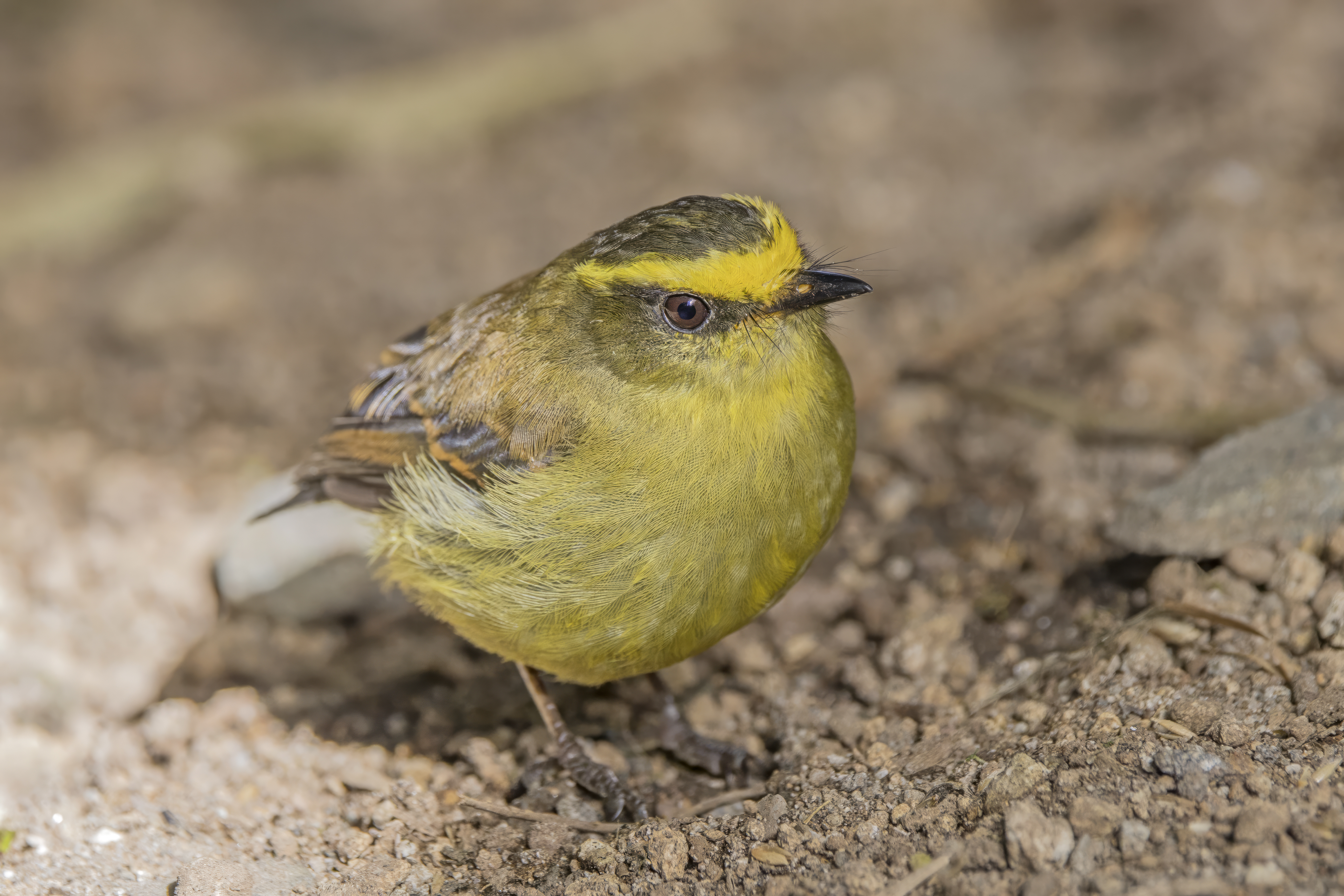
- Silvicultrix diadema gratiosa, Colombia

Conservation status
- Least Concern (IUCN 3.1)

Scientific classification
- Kingdom: Animalia
- Phylum: Chordata
- Class: Aves
- Order: Passeriformes
- Family: Tyrannidae
- Genus: Silvicultrix
- Species: S. diadema

Binomial name
- Silvicultrix diadema (Hartlaub, 1843)

Synonyms
- See text

= Yellow-bellied chat-tyrant =

Species of bird

The yellow-bellied chat-tyrant (Silvicultrix diadema) is a species of passerine bird in the family Tyrannidae, the tyrant flycatchers. It is found in Colombia, Ecuador, Peru, and Venezuela.

== Taxonomy and systematics ==
The yellow-bellied chat-tyrant has a complicated taxonomic history. It was formally described in 1843 as Myiobius diadema. In 1966 Meyer de Schauensee placed the yellow-bellied chat-tyrant in genus Ochthoeca. Wesley Lanyon moved it to Silvicultrix when he erected that genus in 1986. In 2009 the IOC adopted the change in genus to Silvicultrix. BirdLife International's Handbook of the Birds of the World (HBW) adopted the reassignment to Silvicultrix in 2016, the Clements taxonomy in 2022, and the South American Classification Committee of the American Ornithological Society (SACC) in 2023.

The yellow-bellied chat-tyrant has these five subspecies:

- S. d. jesupi (Allen, JA, 1900)
- S. d. rubellula (Wetmore, 1946)
- S. d. tovarensis (Gilliard, 1940)
- S. d. diadema (Hartlaub, 1843)
- S. d. gratiosa (Sclater, PL, 1862)

== Description ==
The yellow-bellied chat-tyrant is 12 to 12.5 cm (4.7 to 4.9 in) long. It appears large-headed and has long rictal bristles. The sexes have the same plumage. Adults of the nominate subspecies S. d. diadema have a dark olive crown, blackish lores, and a yellow forecrown that continues as a supercilium that becomes thinner and paler as it extends far past the eye. Their face is otherwise dark olive. Their upperparts are olivaceous to brownish olive. Their wings and tail are dusky. Their throat and belly are light yellow and their breast a more olive-yellow. Juveniles have an ochraceous tinge on the back of the supercilium, a rufous wash on their back, and an ochraceous vent.

The other subspecies differ from the nominate and each other thus:

- S. d. jesupi: no visible difference from nominate in the field
- S. d. rubellula: rufescent brown back and wide rufous edges on the flight feathers
- S. d. tovarensis: similar to nominate with brighter yellow underparts
- S. d. gratiosa: upperwing coverts have dull rufous tips and flight feathers have rufous edges

All subspecies have a dark brown iris, a black bill, and black legs and feet.

== Distribution and habitat ==
The yellow-bellied chat-tyrant has a disjunct distribution. The subspecies are found thus:

- S. d. jesupi: the isolated Sierra Nevada de Santa Marta in northern Colombia
- S. d. rubellula: the Serranía del Perijá that straddles the Colombia-Venezuela border
- S. d. tovarensis: eastern Venezuelan Coastal Range in Aragua and the Federal District
- S. d. diadema: Andes of western Venezuela into Colombia's Eastern Andes
- S. d. gratiosa: Colombia's Central and Western Andes south on the western Andean slope of Ecuador into Pichincha Province and on the eastern slope through Ecuador into northern Peru to the Marañón River valley in Piura and Cajamarca departments.

The yellow-bellied chat-tyrant primarily inhabits the interior and undergrowth of humid montane forest and cloudforest in the subtropical and temperate zones. It occurs less often on the forest edge along watercourses and tends to shun stands of bamboo. In elevation it ranges between 1,950 and 2,200 m (6,400 and 7,200 ft) in the Venezuelan Coastal Range and between 2,100 and 3,050 m (6,900 and 10,000 ft) elsewhere in Venezuela. It ranges between 1,800 and 3,200 m (5,900 and 10,500 ft) in Colombia, mostly between 2,200 and 3,100 m (7,200 and 10,200 ft) in Ecuador, and between 2,300 and 3,100 m (7,500 and 10,200 ft) in Peru.

== Behavior ==
=== Movement ===
The yellow-bellied chat-tyrant is a year-round resident.

=== Feeding ===
The yellow-bellied chat-tyrant feeds on insects, primarily small beetles (Coleoptera). It typically forages singly or in pairs, perching erect within about 5 m (15 ft) of the ground in the dense mossy understory. It occasionally joins mixed-species feeding flocks but often ignores them while foraging nearby. It frequently flicks its wings and tail and is aggressive to other birds. It takes most prey with a sally from the perch to glean it from leaves low to the ground; it sometimes takes prey from twigs or the ground. Its bill makes an audible snap during a catch.

=== Breeding ===
The yellow-bellied chat-tyrant's breeding season has not been fully defined but spans January to October in Colombia and March to December in Ecuador. Its nest is thought to be a cup made from moss placed on an earthen bank. Nothing else is known about the species' breeding biology.

=== Vocalization ===
The yellow-bellied chat-tyrant's dawn song is "a fast, thin, and delicate little trill that ascends slightly, chiiiiiiii-iiiiiiiit (or prrrreeeeeeeee)"; it has been compared to "fingers running up a comb". Its day song is much less frequently heard, "a longer, thin trill that sags slightly in middle, chiiiiiiiiaaaaaaaa iiiiiii, then ascends at end" and it also makes "a much longer trill, ppprrrrrreeeeeeeeeeeeeeaa, that slowly rises then drops slightly at end". Its song has also been described as "a very dry trill, slightly inflected at start, e.g. tsueéurrrrrr".

== Status ==
The IUCN has assessed the yellow-bellied chat-tyrant as being of Least Concern. It has a very large range; its population size is not known and is believed to be stable. No immediate threats have been identified. It is considered uncommon to locally fairly common overall and fairly common in Venezuela and Colombia. It is everywhere inconspicuous and might be more common than thought.

== Gallery ==
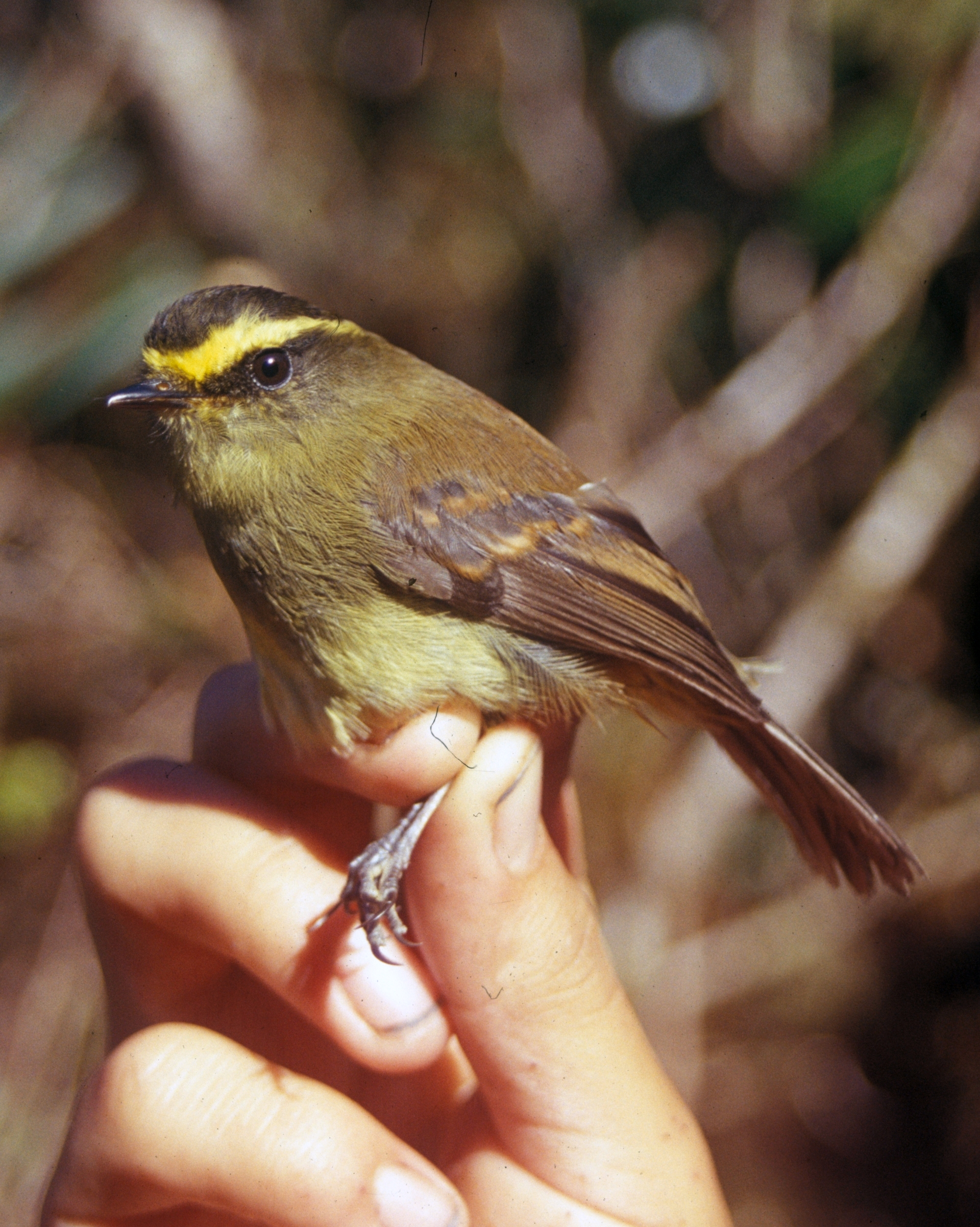

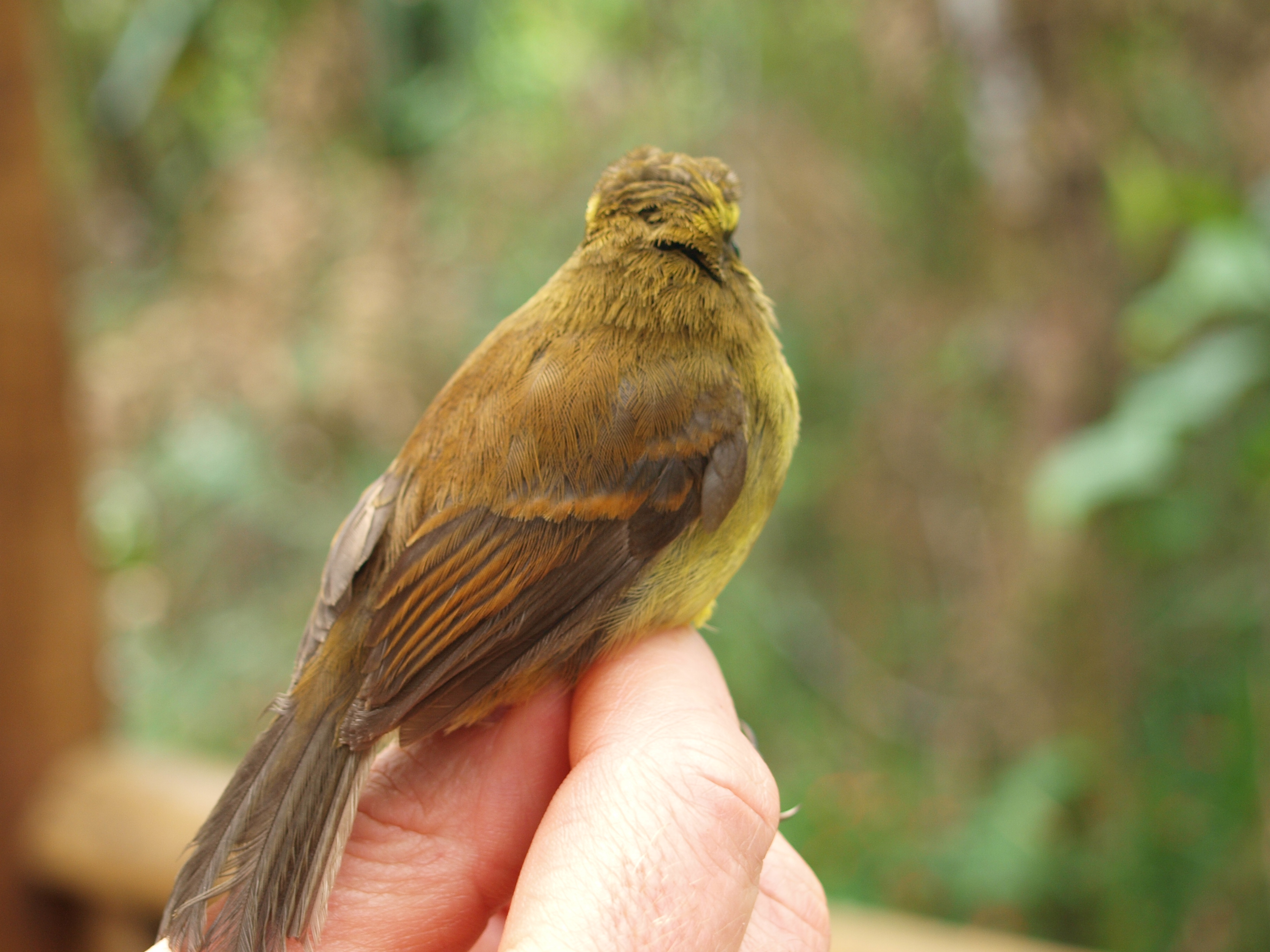

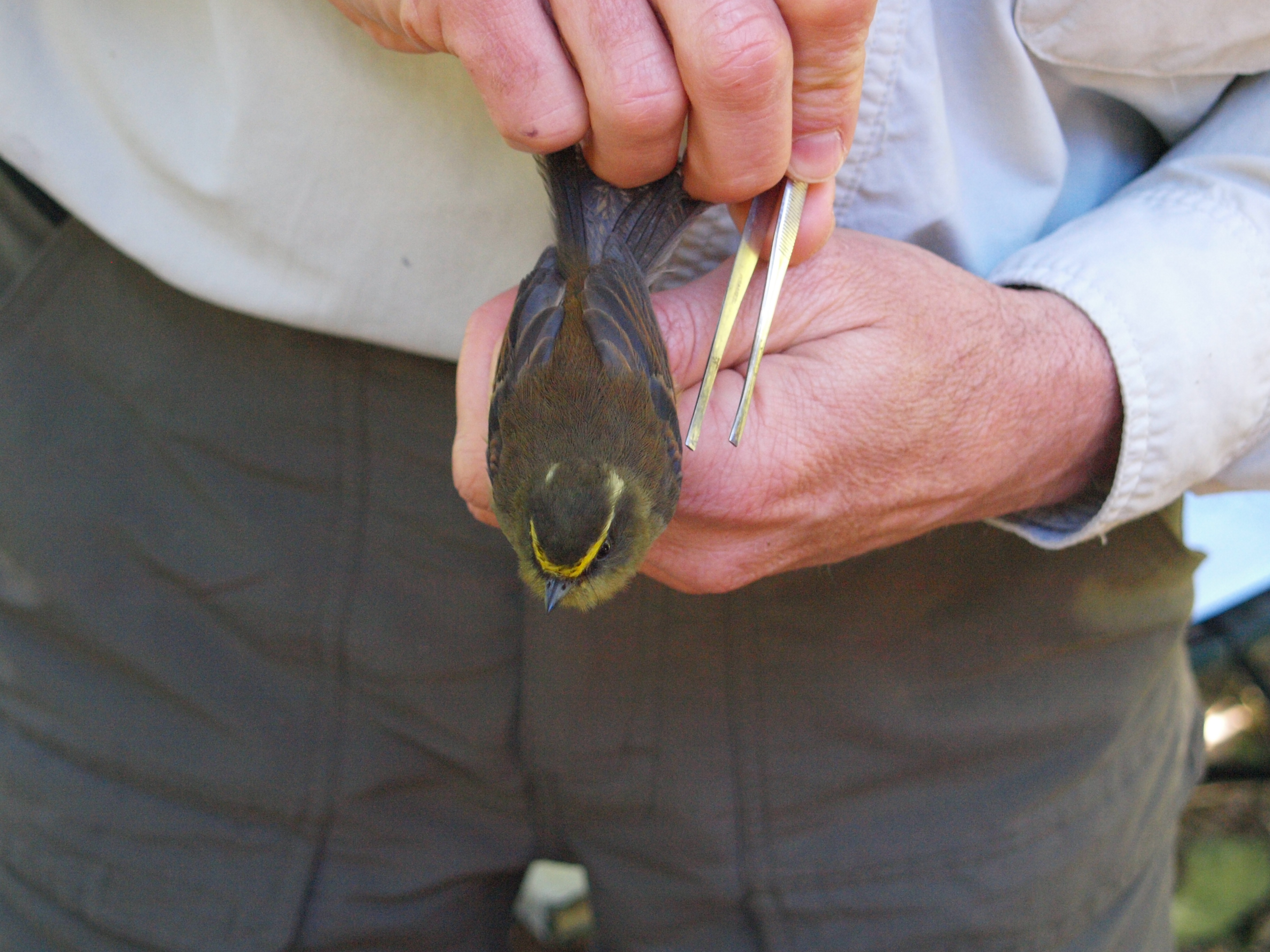

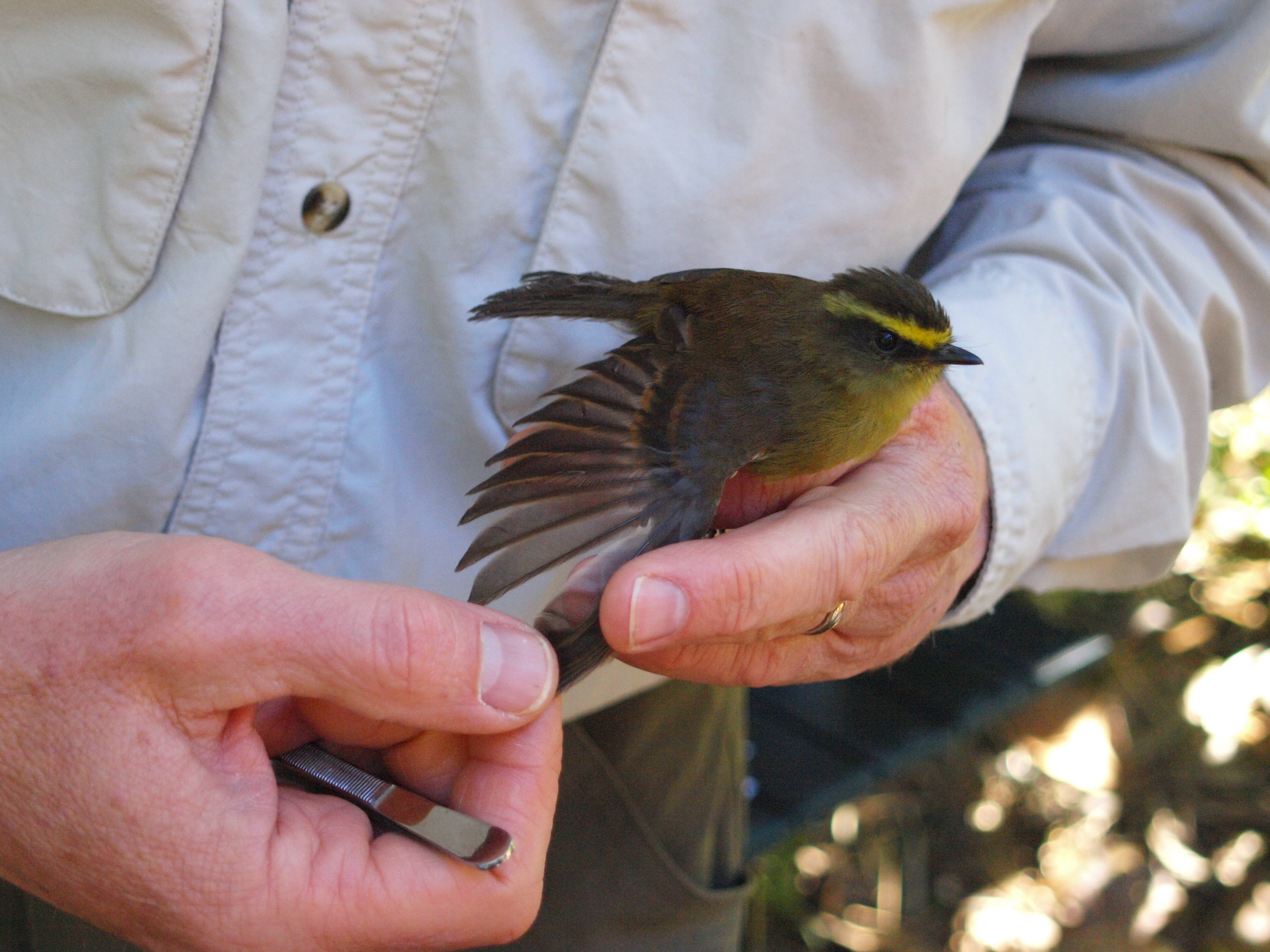
