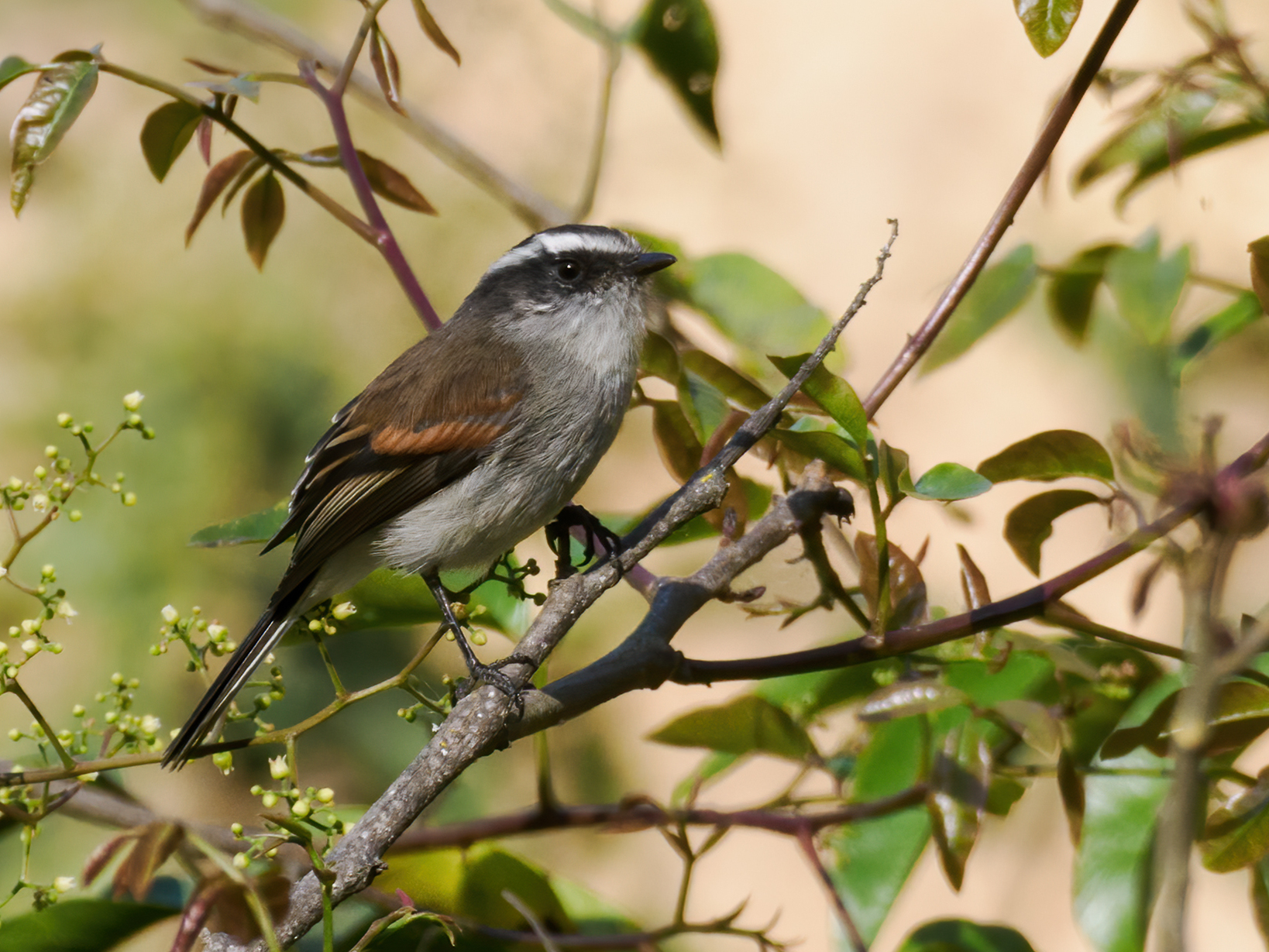

Conservation status
- Least Concern (IUCN 3.1)

Scientific classification
- Kingdom: Animalia
- Phylum: Chordata
- Class: Aves
- Order: Passeriformes
- Family: Tyrannidae
- Genus: Ochthoeca
- Species: O. piurae

Binomial name
- Ochthoeca piurae Chapman, 1924

= Piura chat-tyrant =

Species of bird

The Piura chat-tyrant (Ochthoeca piurae) is a species of bird in the family Tyrannidae, the tyrant flycatchers. It is endemic to Peru.

== Taxonomy and systematics ==
The Piura chat-tyrant was originally described as Ochthoeca piurae, a full species. It was soon reassigned as a subspecies of the white-browed chat-tyrant (Ochthoeca leucophrys). Since it was returned to full species status in the 1960s, at least one publication has suggested that it should return to subspecies status. The white-browed and Piura chat-tyrants form a superspecies.

The Piura chat-tyrant is monotypic.

== Description ==
The Piura chat-tyrant is 12 to 12.5 cm (4.7 to 4.9 in) long and weighs about 9 g (0.32 oz). The sexes have the same plumage. Adults have a dark brown crown, a wide white supercilium that begins at the lores and extends well past the eye, and a blackish "mask". Their upperparts are dark brown with a rufescent tinge on the lower back and rump. Their wings are dark brown with two wide rufous wing bars and white edges on the flight feathers. Their tail is dark brown with white outer edges on the outermost feathers. Their throat and underparts are gray that becomes whitish on the lower belly and vent. They have a brown iris, a black bill, and black legs and feet.

== Distribution and habitat ==
The Piura chat-tyrant is found in northern Peru on the western slope of the Andes from southeastern Piura Department south to central Ancash Department. One record in Lima Department suggests its range may extend further south than thought. The species inhabits the edges of arid and semi-arid montane forest and also scrubby hillsides. In elevation it ranges between 1,400 and 2,850 m (4,600 and 9,400 ft).

== Behavior ==
=== Movement ===
The Piura chat-tyrant is a year-round resident.

=== Feeding ===
The Piura chat-tyrant feeds on insects, though details are lacking. It usually forages singly or in pairs. Its foraging behavior is not known but it is assumed to "capture prey with sallys to the ground or to air" like other chat-tyrants.

=== Breeding ===
Nothing is known about the Piura chat-tyrant's breeding biology.

=== Vocalization ===
What is thought to be the Piura chat-tyrant's song is "a thin, high trill" that is similar to that of the crowned chat-tyrant, with which it does not overlap. That song is "a drawn-out rather high-pitched but descending trill, ses-rrrrrrrrrrrrrrrrrrrrrrrrrrrrrr" that lasts several seconds.

== Status ==
The IUCN originally in 1994 assessed the Piura chat-tyrant as Near Threatened but since 2020 as being of Least Concern. It has a restricted range; its population size is not known and is believe to be decreasing. "The species is not as threatened as other forest-dependent species in the region, but ongoing habitat clearance and degradation of montane scrub and riparian thickets are presumably causing slow population declines." It is considered rare and local.
