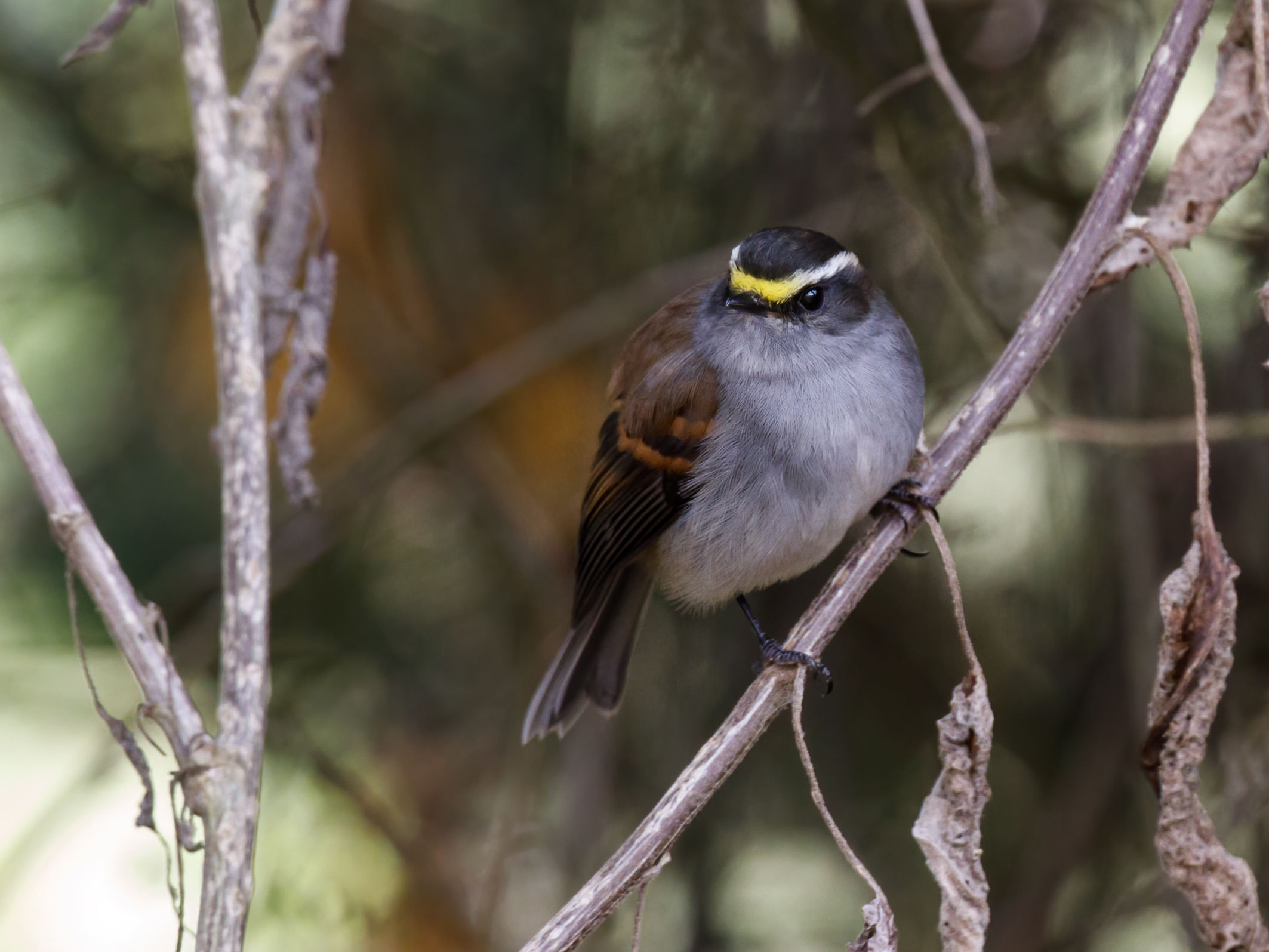

Conservation status
- Least Concern (IUCN 3.1)

Scientific classification
- Kingdom: Animalia
- Phylum: Chordata
- Class: Aves
- Order: Passeriformes
- Family: Tyrannidae
- Genus: Silvicultrix
- Species: S. jelskii

Binomial name
- Silvicultrix jelskii (Taczanowski, 1883)

= Jelski's chat-tyrant =

Species of bird

Jelski's chat-tyrant (Silvicultrix jelskii) is a species of passerine bird in the family Tyrannidae, the tyrant flycatchers. It is found in Ecuador and Peru.

== Taxonomy and systematics ==
Jelski's chat-tyrant has a complicated taxonomic history. It was formally described in 1883 as Ochthoeca jelskii. What is now Kalinowski's chat-tyrant (Silvicultrix spondionata) was described in 1896 as a subspecies of Jelski's. Both taxa were later treated as subspecies of the crowned chat-tyrant (then Tyrannula frontalis). In 1966 Meyer de Schauensee placed the crowned chat-tyrant in genus Ochthoeca, returning Jelski's and Kalinowski's chat-tyrants to their original genus, though still as subspecies of the crowned chat-tyrant. Wesley Lanyon moved the crowned chat-tyrant to Silvicultrix when he erected that genus in 1986.

By 1990 some authors had elevated Kalinowski's and Jelski's chat-tyrants to full species. By 2006 the IOC had recognized Jelski's chat-tyrant as a species and then adopted the change in genus to Silvicultrix in 2009. The first version of BirdLife International's Handbook of the Birds of the World (HBW), published in 2007, included Jelski's chat-tyrant as a full species. The Clements taxonomy and the South American Classification Committee of the American Ornithological Society (SACC) later accepted it as a species. (Note: These sources show that the recognition occurred by their dates. Earlier versions are not available.) HBW adopted the reassignment of Jelski's chat-tyrant to genus Silvicultrix in 2016, Clements in 2022, and the SACC in 2023.

Jelski's chat-tyrant is monotypic.

== Description ==
Jelski's chat-tyrant is 12 to 12.5 cm (4.7 to 4.9 in) long. Adult males have a blackish brown crown and a yellow forecrown that continues and becomes white as a supercilium that extends far past the eye on an otherwise blackish brown face. Their upperparts are rufous-brown, especially on the rump. Their wings are dusky with rufous tips on the coverts that show as two bold wing bars. Their tail is dusky or brownish. Their throat and breast are gray, their belly rufous-tinged gray, and their crissum buffy. Adult females have buffier underparts than males, especially on the lower belly. Both sexes have a dark iris, a black bill, and black legs and feet.

== Distribution and habitat ==
Jelski's chat-tyrant is found from southwestern Ecuador's Loja Province into Peru as far as Huánuco and Lima departments. It inhabits the understory and edges of montane forest and secondary woodland, and also shrubby areas along nearby watercourses. In elevation it occurs between 2,200 and 2,800 m (7,200 and 9,200 ft) in Ecuador and between 2,300 and 3,200 m (7,500 and 10,500 ft) in Peru.

== Behavior ==
=== Movement ===
Jelski's chat-tyrant is a year-round resident.

=== Feeding ===
Jelski's chat-tyrant feeds on insects. It usually forages singly but occasionally joins mixed-species feeding flocks. It perches inconspicuously near the ground in the forest undergrowth. It takes prey with sallies from the perch to vegetation and occasionally to the ground.

=== Breeding ===
Nothing is known about the breeding biology of Jelski's chat-tyrant.

=== Vocalization ===
The song of Jelski's chat-tyrant is "a high, squeaky tseee! ending with a krrr phrase when excited". Its calls are "squeaky chatters and descending high trills".

== Status ==
The IUCN has assessed Jelski's chat-tyrant as being of Least Concern. It has a large range; its population size is not known and is believed to be decreasing. No immediate threats have been identified. It is considered "uncommon and local" in Ecuador and "uncommon" in Peru. It occurs in a few protected areas.
