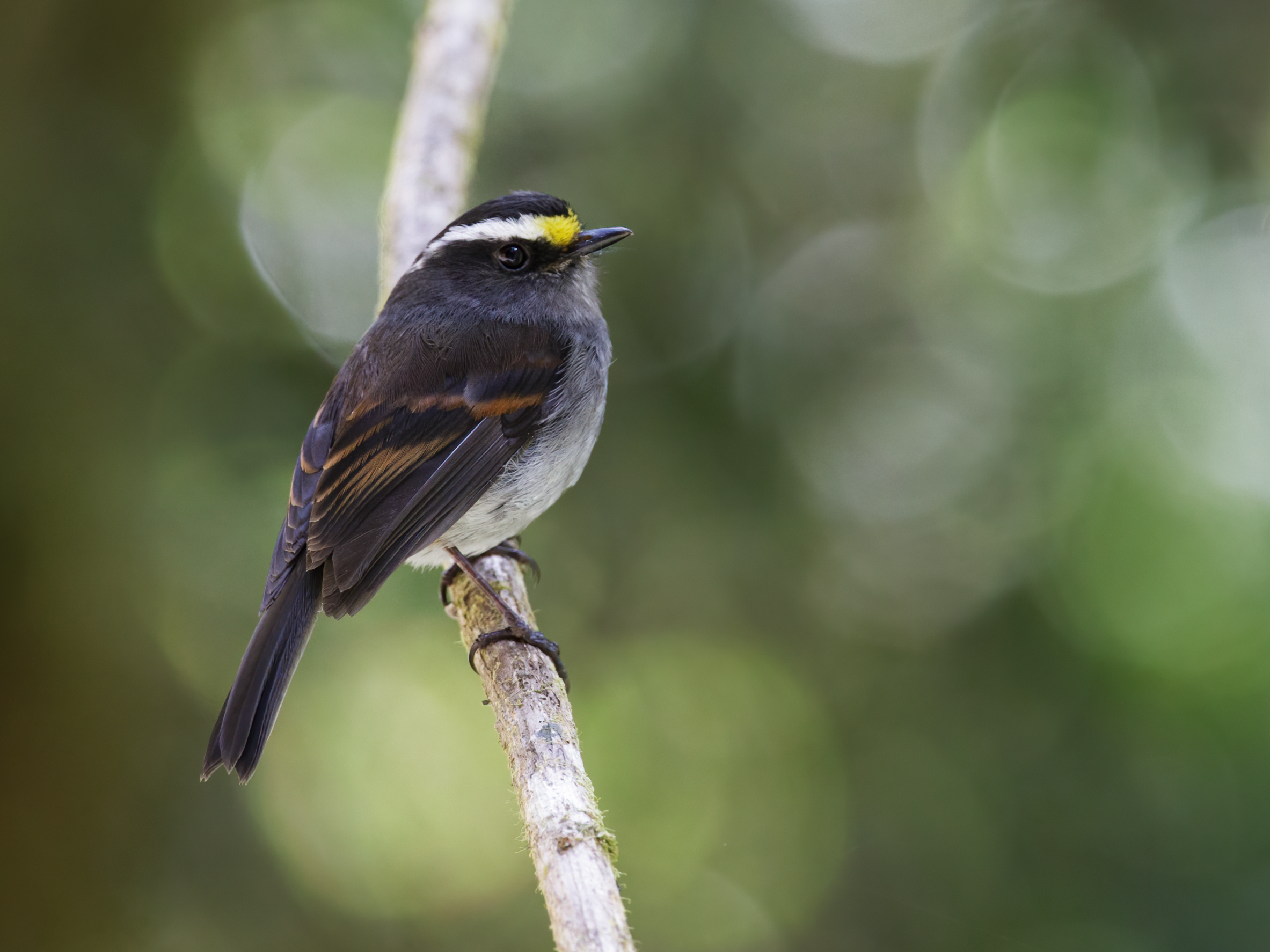

Scientific classification
- Kingdom: Animalia
- Phylum: Chordata
- Class: Aves
- Order: Passeriformes
- Family: Tyrannidae
- Genus: Silvicultrix
- Species: S. spodionota

Binomial name
- Silvicultrix spodionota (Berlepsch & Stolzmann, 1896)

Synonyms
- See text

= Kalinowski's chat-tyrant =

Species of bird

Kalinowski's chat-tyrant, also known as the Peruvian chat-tyrant, (Silvicultrix spodionota) is a species of passerine bird in the family Tyrannidae, the tyrant flycatchers. It is found in Bolivia and Peru.

== Taxonomy and systematics ==
Kalinowski's chat-tyrant has a complicated taxonomic history that as of early 2025 had not been fully resolved. It was formally described in 1896 as Ochthoeca jelskii spodionata, a subspecies of Jelski's chat-tyrant. Both taxa were later treated as subspecies of the crowned chat-tyrant (then Tyrannula frontalis). In 1966 Meyer de Schauensee placed the crowned chat-tyrant in genus Ochthoeca, returning Jelski's and Kalinowski's chat-tyrants to their original genus, though still as subspecies of the crowned chat-tyrant. Wesley Lanyon moved the crowned chat-tyrant to Silvicultrix when he erected that genus in 1986.

By 1990 some authors had elevated Kalinowski's and Jelski's chat-tyrants to full species. By 2006 the IOC had recognized Kalinowski's chat-tyrant as a species and then adopted the change in genus to Silvicultrix in 2009. The IOC assigns the species two subspecies, the nominate S. s. spodionata (Berlepsch & Stolzmann, 1896) and S. s. boliviana (Carriker, 1935).

BirdLife International's Handbook of the Birds of the World (HBW) adopted the reassignment of the crowned chat-tyrant to genus Silvicultrix in 2016, the Clements taxonomy in 2022, and the South American Classification Committee of the American Ornithological Society (SACC) in 2023. However, they retain spodionata and boliviana as subspecies of the chrowned chat-tyrant. Clements does separate the two pairs within its one species as "crowned chat-tyrant (crowned)" and "crowned chat-tyrant (Kalinowski's)".

Kalinowski's chat-tyrant is named after Jan Kalinowski, who collected the type specimen.

This article follows the IOC model of a separate species with two subspecies.

== Description ==
Kalinowski's chat-tyrant is 12.5 to 13 cm (4.9 to 5.1 in) long. The two subspecies are almost alike. Adult males of the nominate subspecies have a dark gray-brown crown and a yellow forecrown that continues and becomes white as a supercilium that extends somewhat past the eye on an otherwise dark brown face. Subspecies S. s. boliviana has a longer supercilium that extends almost to the nape but otherwise has the same plumage as the nominate. The subspecies' upperparts are dark gray-brown. Their wings and tail are mostly dusky with dusky brown edges on the feathers; the wing coverts have rufous tips that usually show as one or two wing bars. Their throat is whitish gray, their breast and upper belly dark gray, their lower belly whitish gray, and their crissum whitish. Adult females have a lighter crown than males. Both sexes have a dark iris, a black bill, and black legs and feet. Juveniles are brighter overall than adults and have a buff tinge on the supercilium, buffy wing bars, and a brownish wash on the flanks and belly.

== Distribution and habitat ==
The nominate subspecies of Kalinowski's chat-tyrant is found only in Peru, in a relatively small area of Junín, the Cordillera Vilcabamba of western Cuzco, and northeastern Ayacucho departments. Subspecies S. s. boliviana is found in north-central Peru's San Martín and Huánuco departments and then from the Urubamba Valley in southern Cuzco south on the eastern Andean slope into the western part of central Bolivia's Santa Cruz Department. The species inhabits humid montane forest and woodland, elfin forest, and scrubby areas in the temperate zone up to tree line. In elevation it ranges in Peru mostly between 2,800 and 3,700 m (9,200 and 12,100 ft) but locally as low as 2,300 m (7,500 ft); in Bolivia it reaches 4,000 m (13,000 ft).

== Behavior ==
=== Movement ===
Kalinowski's chat-tyrant is a year-round resident.

=== Feeding ===
Kalinowski's chat-tyrant feeds on insects. It usually forages singly but occasionally joins mixed-species feeding flocks. It perches inconspicuously near the ground in the forest undergrowth. It takes prey with sallies from the perch to vegetation, branches, and trunks.

=== Breeding ===
The breeding season of Kalinowski's chat-tyrant has not been defined but includes November in Peru. Its nest is an open cup placed in a niche in a cliff or in a shrub or bush. Nothing else is known about the species' breeding biology.

=== Vocalization ===
The dawn song of Kalinowski's chat-tyrant is "a high, descending whistle followed by a lower rising note: tseeeut...ree? sometimes interspersed with a squeaky chatter". Its call is "a long, abruptly rising, then slowly falling, thin, high, trill: WREEzzeeeeerrrrr".

== Status ==
The IUCN follows HBW taxonomy and so has not separately assessed the crowned and Kalinowski's chat-tyrants. The combined taxa are judged to be of Least Concern. Their population size is not known and is believed to be decreasing. No immediate threats have been identified. It is considered "fairly common, but quiet and inconspicuous" in Peru. It is found in all of the protected areas within its range.
