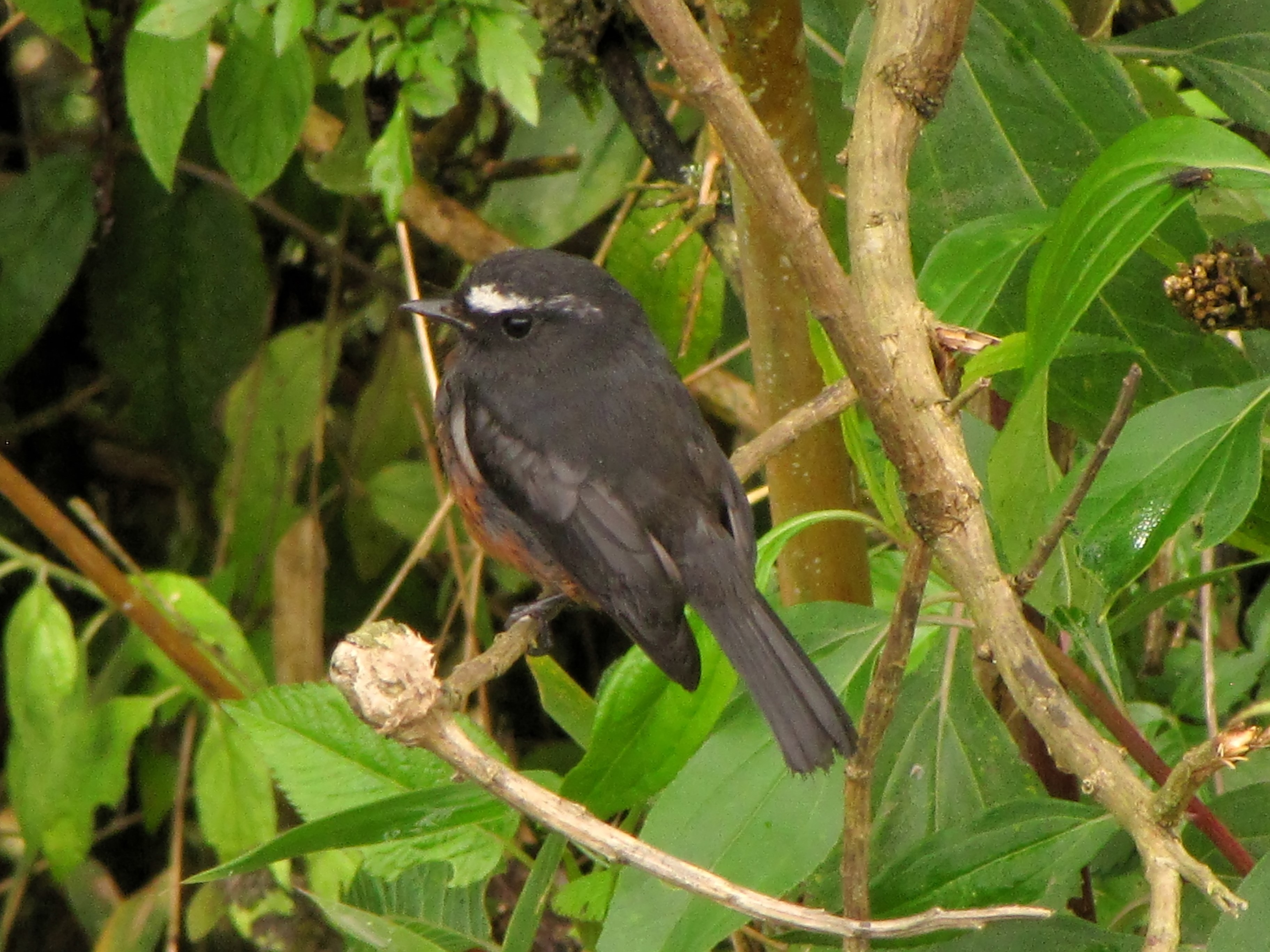

Conservation status
- Least Concern (IUCN 3.1)

Scientific classification
- Kingdom: Animalia
- Phylum: Chordata
- Class: Aves
- Order: Passeriformes
- Family: Tyrannidae
- Genus: Ochthoeca
- Species: O. cinnamomeiventris

Binomial name
- Ochthoeca cinnamomeiventris (Lafresnaye, 1843)

= Slaty-backed chat-tyrant =

Species of bird

The slaty-backed chat-tyrant or chestnut-bellied chat-tyrant (Ochthoeca cinnamomeiventris) is a species of bird in the family Tyrannidae, the tyrant flycatchers. It is found in Bolivia, Colombia, Ecuador, Peru, and Venezuela.

== Taxonomy and systematics ==
The slaty-backed chat-tyrant was formally described in 1843 as Muscicapa cinnamomeiventris, erroneously placing it in the Old World flycatcher family. It was eventually moved to genus Ochthoeca and for a time it, the maroon-belted chat-tyrant (O. thoracica) and the blackish chat-tyrant (O. nigrita) were considered conspecific. A study published in 1998 suggested that each of them should be raised to full species level. By 2006 the IOC had recognized the slaty-backed chat-tyrant as a species. BirdLife International's Handbook of the Birds of the World (HBW) recognized it in 2016 and the Clements taxonomy in 2022. However, the South American Classification Committee of the American Ornithological Society retains the blackish chat-tyrant as a subspecies of the slaty-backed.

The slaty-backed chat-tyrant is monotypic.

== Description ==
The slaty-backed chat-tyrant is 12 to 13 cm (4.7 to 5.1 in) long and weighs 11 to 13 g (0.39 to 0.46 oz). The sexes have the same plumage. Adults have a dark slaty gray head with a white supercilium. Their upperparts and tail are dark slaty gray to blackish. Their wings are slightly browner than the back. Their breast and belly are deep dark chestnut or reddish brown, their flanks dark gray, and their vent and the middle of their lower belly are buffy white. They have a dark brown or blackish iris, a short, thin, black bill, and blackish to dark dusky gray legs and feet.

== Distribution and habitat ==
The slaty-backed chat-tyrant is found from Táchira in far western Venezuela south through all three ranges of the Colombian Andes, continuing in Ecuador on the western Andean slope to Cotopaxi Province and on the eastern slope for the length of the country and into northern Peru as far as the Marañón River. It primarily inhabits humid montane forest and woodlands in the upper subtropical and temperate zones. It almost exclusively is found in dense vegetation along streams or in wet shady ravines. In elevation it ranges between 1,800 and 2,800 m (5,900 and 9,200 ft) in Venezuela, between 1,600 and 3,000 m (5,200 and 9,800 ft) in Colombia, mostly between 1,700 and 2,800 m (5,600 and 9,200 ft) in Ecuador, and mostly between 1,800 and 3,300 m (5,900 and 10,800 ft) but locally as low as 1,500 m (4,900 ft) in Peru.

== Behavior ==
=== Movement ===
The slaty-backed chat-tyrant is believed to be a year-round resident.

=== Feeding ===
The slaty-backed chat-tyrant's diet is not known but is believed to be mostly or entirely small insects. It typically forages in pairs, though sometimes singly, and seldom joins mixed-species feeding flocks unless they pass through its territory. It perches on a low branch or vine along a watercourse and take prey with aerial sallies from it to glean from vegetation or take it in mid-air, and frequently return to the same perch.

=== Breeding ===
The slaty-backed chat-tyrant's breeding season varies geographically. In eastern Ecuador nesting has been observed during most of the year with the peak of activity in September to November. In Colombia its season apparently spans from January to August. The species' nest is a thick cup made from moss and lined with tree fern scales. Nests are placed in a variety of locations including within thick vegetation, in a rock crevice, and on an earthen bank or cliff; all are near streams and one was found behind a waterfall. The clutch size is usually two eggs but single egg clutches are known. The eggs are white to ivory and sometimes have a few cinnamon spots. The only known incubation period was 14 days. Fledging occurs 18 to 20 days after hatch. Though parental care is not known for certain, it appears that one adult incubates and both provision nestlings.

=== Vocalization ===
The slaty-backed chat-tyrant's day song, or perhaps call, is "a high-pitched, sharp, and surprisingly loud dzweeéyeeuw, often tirelessly repeated". Its dawn song is the same vocalization "followed by 3-4 tseét notes". "Despite (or thanks to) its simplicity, [the songs are] perfectly audible above rushing torrents, where this species is usually found."

== Status ==
The IUCN has assessed the slaty-backed chat-tyrant as being of Least Concern. It has a very large range; its population size is not known and is believed to be decreasing. No immediate threats have been identified. It is considered locally fairly common in Venezuela, fairly common in Colombia and Ecuador, and uncommon in Peru. It occurs in many protected areas along the Andes. No specific human effects on the species have been documented, "but any alterations to riparian zones and streams, even outside and upstream of protected areas, may have detrimental effects on populations".
