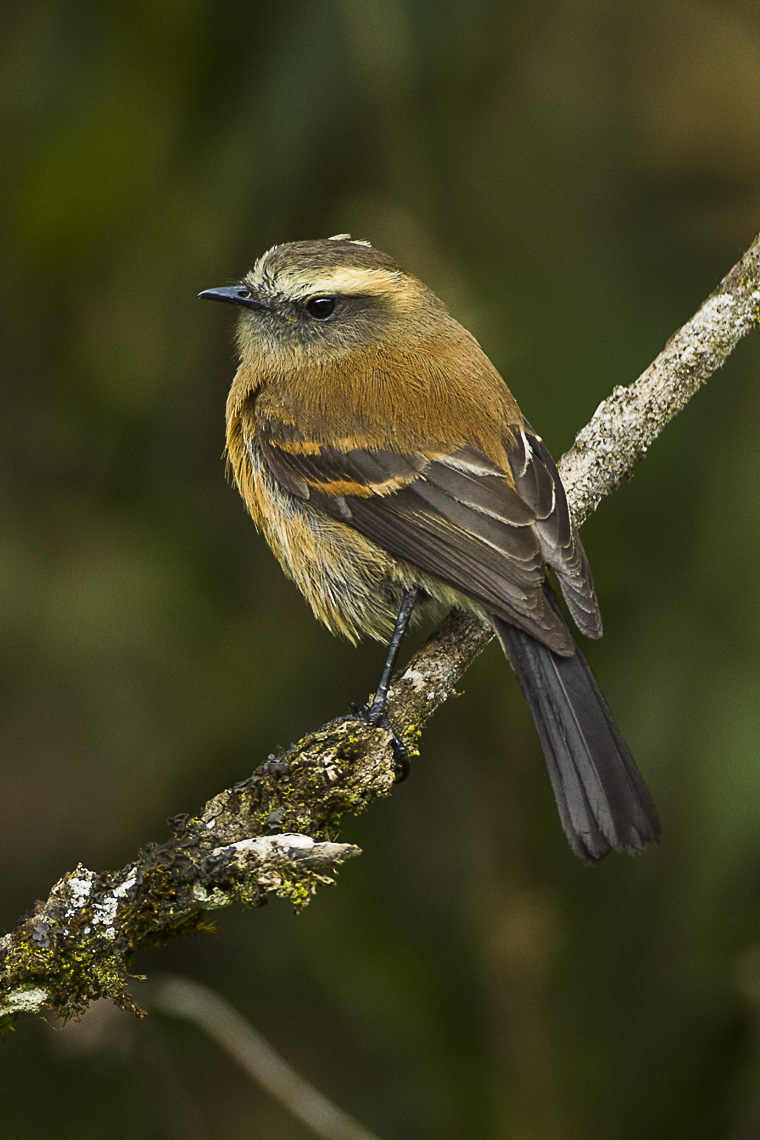

Conservation status
- Least Concern (IUCN 3.1)

Scientific classification
- Kingdom: Animalia
- Phylum: Chordata
- Class: Aves
- Order: Passeriformes
- Family: Tyrannidae
- Genus: Ochthoeca
- Species: O. fumicolor

Binomial name
- Ochthoeca fumicolor Sclater, PL, 1856

= Brown-backed chat-tyrant =

Species of bird

The brown-backed chat-tyrant (Ochthoeca fumicolor) is a species of bird in the family Tyrannidae, the tyrant flycatchers. It is found in Bolivia, Colombia, Ecuador, Peru, and Venezuela.

== Taxonomy and systematics ==
The brown-backed chat-tyrant's taxonomy is unsettled. The IOC, the Clements taxonomy, and BirdLife International's Handbook of the Birds of the World (HBW) assign it these four subspecies:

- O. f. ferruginea Zimmer, JT, 1937
- O. f. fumicolor Sclater, PL, 1856
- O. f. brunneifrons Berlepsch & Stolzmann, 1896
- O. f. berlepschi Hellmayr, 1914

However, the South American Classification Committee of the American Ornithological Society (SACC) includes a fifth subspecies, O. f. superciliosa, that the other systems had also long included. It had been originally described in 1870 as a species and the SACC notes that at least one author early in the twentieth century continued to recognize it as one. HBW recognized that taxon as the rufous-browed chat-tyrant in 2016, Clements in 2022, and the IOC in 2023.

This article follows the four-subspecies model.

== Description ==
The brown-backed chat-tyrant is 14.5 to 16 cm (5.7 to 6.3 in) long and weighs 16 to 19 g (0.56 to 0.67 oz). The sexes have much the same plumage though females have somewhat paler and duller underparts than males. Adults of the nominate subspecies O. f. fumicolor have a warm brown crown and wide whitish supercilium that begins at the lores and becomes somewhat ochraceous past the eye. The rest of their face is grayish. Their upperparts are rufescent brown that becomes a rufous brown on the rump. Their wings are dusky or blackish with two prominent rufous wing bars. Their tail is dusky to blackish with white outer webs of the outermost feathers. Their throat is grayish and the rest of their underparts mostly cinnamon-rufous with buff undertail coverts.

The other subspecies of the brown-backed chat-tyrant differ from the nominate and each other thus:

- O. f. ferruginea: shorter, buffy supercilium and more white on the tail feathers than nominate
- O. f. brunneifrons: longer, entirely buff, supercilium and wider rufous wingbars than nominate
- O. f. berlepschi: shorter, thinner, and dirty whitish supercilium than nominate; some have a browner crown

All subspecies have a dark brown iris, a smallish black bill, and black legs and feet.

== Distribution and habitat ==
The brown-backed chat-tyrant has a disjunct distribution. The subspecies are found thus:

- O. f. ferruginea: Colombia's Central and Western Andes north of Caldas and Cauca departments
- O. f. fumicolor: Andes from southern Táchira in southwestern Venezuela south in Colombia's Eastern Andes to Cundinamarca Department
- O. f. brunneifrons: Andes from Caldas and Cauca in Colombia's Central and Western ranges south on both slopes through Ecuador into Peru, on the western slope to Cajamarca Department and on the eastern slope to Junín Department
- O. f. berlepschi: from Cuzco and Puno departments in southeastern Peru into central Bolivia's La Paz and Cochabamba departments

The brown-backed chat-tyrant primarily inhabits stunted montane forest up to tree line, Polylepis woodlands, and shrubby paramo. It also occurs in pastures with shrubby borders. In elevation it ranges between 2,200 and 4,200 m (7,200 and 13,800 ft) with most records above 2,700 m (8,900 ft) in Venezuela, between 2,500 and 3,600 m (8,200 and 11,800 ft) in Colombia, between 2,800 and 4,200 m (9,200 and 13,800 ft) in Ecuador, and between 2,500 and 4,100 m (8,200 and 13,500 ft) in Peru. There are scattered records as low as 1,800 m (5,900 ft) and as high as 4,500 m (14,800 ft).

== Behavior ==
=== Movement ===
The brown-backed chat-tyrant is a year-round resident though some local elevational movements have been noted in Venezuela.

=== Feeding ===
The brown-backed chat-tyrant feeds on insects, though details are lacking. It usually forages singly or in pairs and sometimes joins mixed-species feeding flocks. It perches upright, in wooded areas on branches near the trunk and in open areas on stumps, fence posts, shrubs, and clumps of grass. It seldom perches more than 2 m (7 ft) above the ground. It captures most prey in mid-air or near the ground ("hawking") but sometimes takes it from leaves or the ground while briefly hovering.

=== Breeding ===
The brown-backed chat-tyrant apparently nests between October and December in northern Ecuador but its season elsewhere is not known. Its nest is a cup made from moss and grass lined with soft plant fibers or animal wool. Nests have been found in grass clumps and in a dense vine tangle. The normal clutch is two eggs. The eggs are cream to white with a few brown, purplish brown, or reddish brown spots. One study in Ecuador found an incubation period of 21 days with fledging occurring 25 days after hatch. The timing elsewhere, and details of parental care throughout the species' range, are not known.

=== Vocalization ===
The brown-backed chat-tyrant usually sings from a perch but occasionally while hidden. Its song in Venezuela is described as "as a fast, rhythmic duet, plee, plít'ter'tew, plít'ter'téw..." and in Peru as "a weak, squeaky chatter, often in duet, of tsi'wit and tee notes". Its dawn song in Ecuador is "a fast chattered keé-ke-de keé-ke-de keé-kedu-keéekeé-ke-du-keé". Its calls include "a high-pitched tsiu, a soft prip, or a clear whistled kleeeip".

== Status ==
The IUCN has assessed the brown-backed chat-tyrant as being of Least Concern. It has a very large range; its population size is not known and is believed to be stable. No immediate threats have been identified. It is considered common in Venezuela, Colombia, and Ecuador and "fairly common" in Peru. It is found in many protected areas both governmental and private. "No effects of human activity on [the] Brown-backed Chat-Tyrant have been directly measured, but burning and clearing of Polylepis woodlands, for firewood and cattle grazing, are undoubtedly detrimentally impacting this species."
