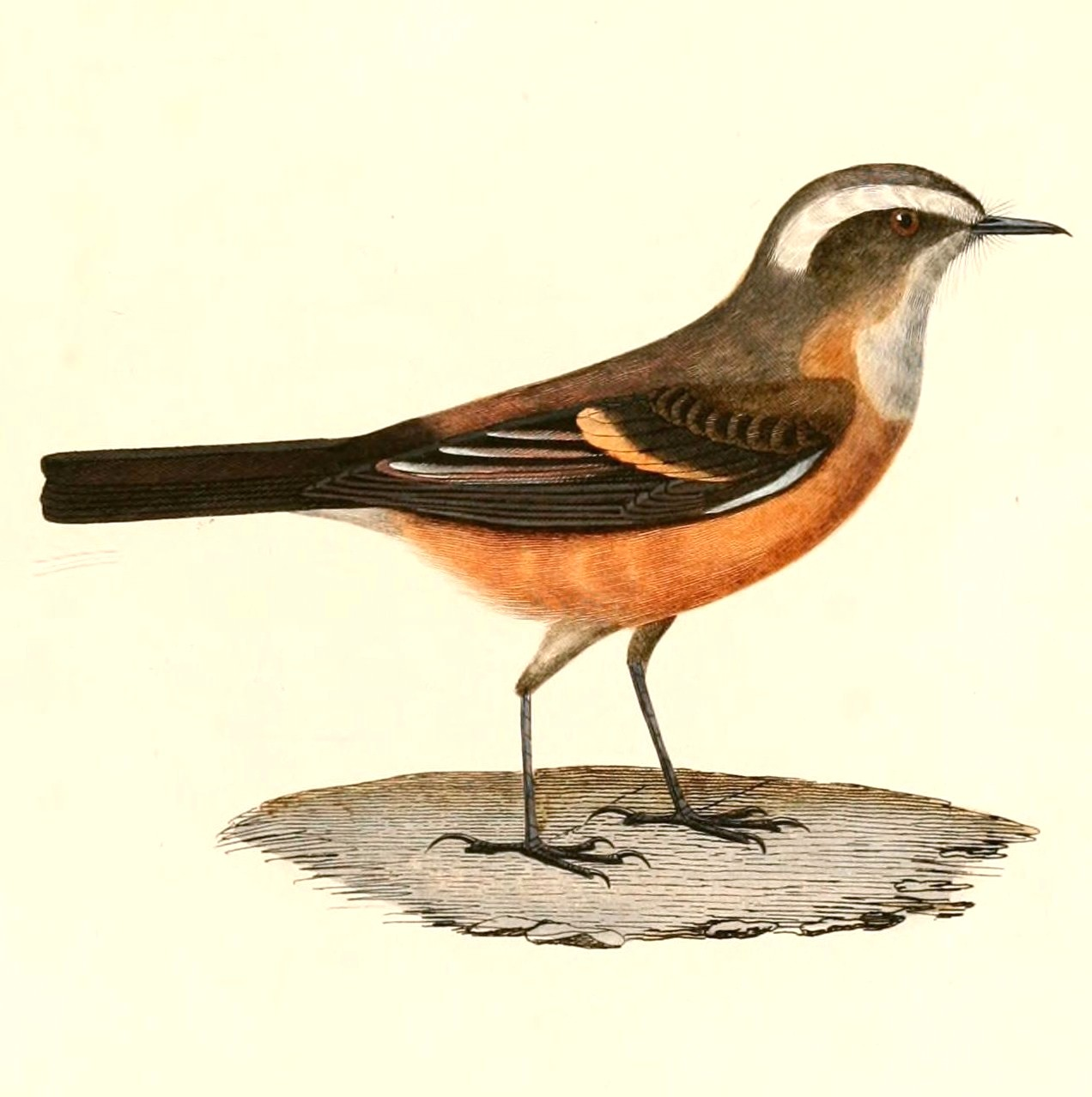

Conservation status
- Least Concern (IUCN 3.1)

Scientific classification
- Kingdom: Animalia
- Phylum: Chordata
- Class: Aves
- Order: Passeriformes
- Family: Tyrannidae
- Genus: Ochthoeca
- Species: O. oenanthoides

Binomial name
- Ochthoeca oenanthoides (D'Orbigny & Lafresnaye, 1837)

Synonyms
- F[luvicola] OEnanthoides (protonym)

= D'Orbigny's chat-tyrant =

Species of bird

D'Orbigny's chat-tyrant (Ochthoeca oenanthoides) is a species of bird in the family Tyrannidae, the tyrant flycatchers. It is found in Argentina, Bolivia, Chile, and Peru.

== Taxonomy and systematics ==
D'Orbigny's chat-tyrant was originally described as "F[luvicola] OEnanthoides". It has two subspecies, the nominate O. o. oenanthoides (D'Orbigny & Lafresnaye, 1837) and O. o. polionota (Sclater, PL & Salvin, 1870).

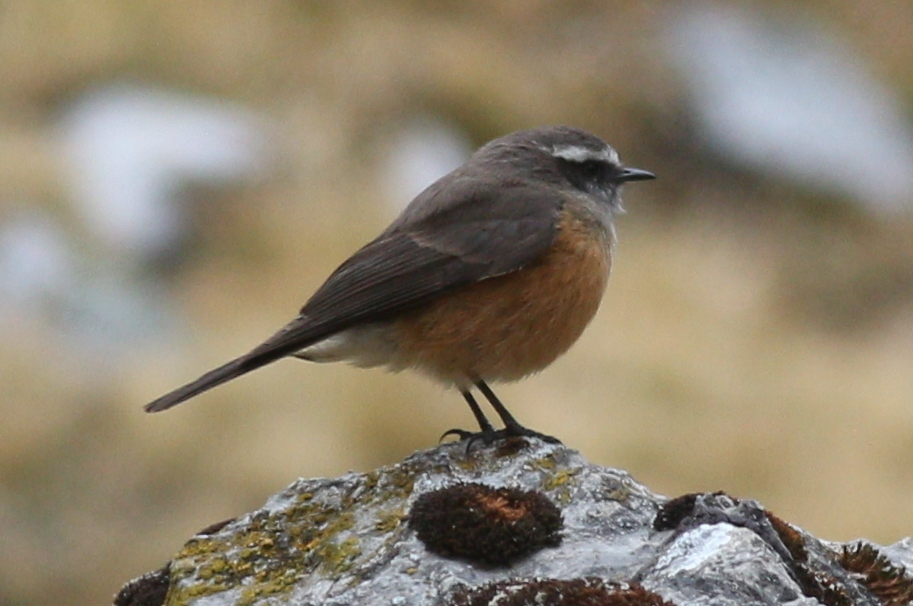
D'Orbigny's chat-tyrant in Peru

== Description ==
D'Orbigny's chat-tyrant is 15 to 15.5 cm (5.9 to 6.1 in) long. The sexes have the same plumage. Adults of the nominate subspecies have a grayish or grayish brown crown, a wide whitish supercilium that begins at the lores and extends well past the eye, and a blackish "mask". Their upperparts are grayish brown or grayish. Their wings are a duskier grayish brown with a weak grayish cinnamon wing bar. The wing's secondaries have thin white edges and their tertials grayish cinnamon edges. Their tail is dusky grayish brown with white outer webs of the outermost feathers. Their throat is grayish, their breast dusky cinnamon, their lower belly deep cinnamon, and their vent white or grayish white. Juveniles have a creamy white supercilium. Subspecies O. o. polionota is overall darker than the nominate. It has sooty upperparts. Its supercilium is whiter and its mask darker than the nominate's and it has weaker wing bars and darker underparts with a cinnamon wash on the vent. Both subspecies have a dark brown iris, a black bill, and black legs and feet.

== Distribution and habitat ==
D'Orbigny's chat-tyrant is a bird of the Andes. Subspecies O. o. polionota is the more northerly of the two. It is found in Peru from La Libertad and San Martín departments south to Cuzco and northern Puno departments. The nominate subspecies is found from southern Puno and Tacna departments in Peru south into far northern Chile's Arica y Parinacota Region and through western Bolivia into northwestern Argentina to La Rioja Province. They overlap slightly in Peru, and are found on the western slope of the Andes in that country. The species inhabits dry montane forest and woodlands, especially those with Polylepis. It often occurs in ravines but does not seem to be necessarily closely associated with water. It also frequently is found on rocky slopes with scattered shrubs. In elevation it mostly ranges between 3,400 to 4,600 m (11,200 to 15,100 ft) in Peru but is found locally down to 3,000 m (9,800 ft). In Argentina it is found as low as 2,000 m (6,600 ft).

== Behavior ==
=== Movement ===
D'Orbigny's chat-tyrant is a year-round resident.

=== Feeding ===
D'Orbigny's chat-tyrant feeds on insects. It usually forages singly or in pairs. It perches in the open, upright on a branch, fencepost, or bush, and takes prey with a sally to the ground. It often returns to the same perch after a capture.

=== Breeding ===
The breeding season of D'Orbigny's chat-tyrant has not been defined but includes December to February in Bolivia. Its nest is an open cup that is typically in a cavity in the face of a cliff. Nothing else is known about the species' breeding biology.

=== Vocalization ===
One vocalization of D'Orbigny's chat-tyrant is described as "a weak, squeaky chatter, often in [a] duet of tee'per phrases". Another description is a "fairly musical reeka-teekera...reeka-teekera...".

== Status ==
The IUCN has assessed D'Orbigny's chat-tyrant as being of Least Concern. It has a very large range; its population size is not known and is believed to be decreasing. No immediate threats have been identified. It is considered uncommon to fairly common overall and fairly common in Peru. It occurs in several national parks.
