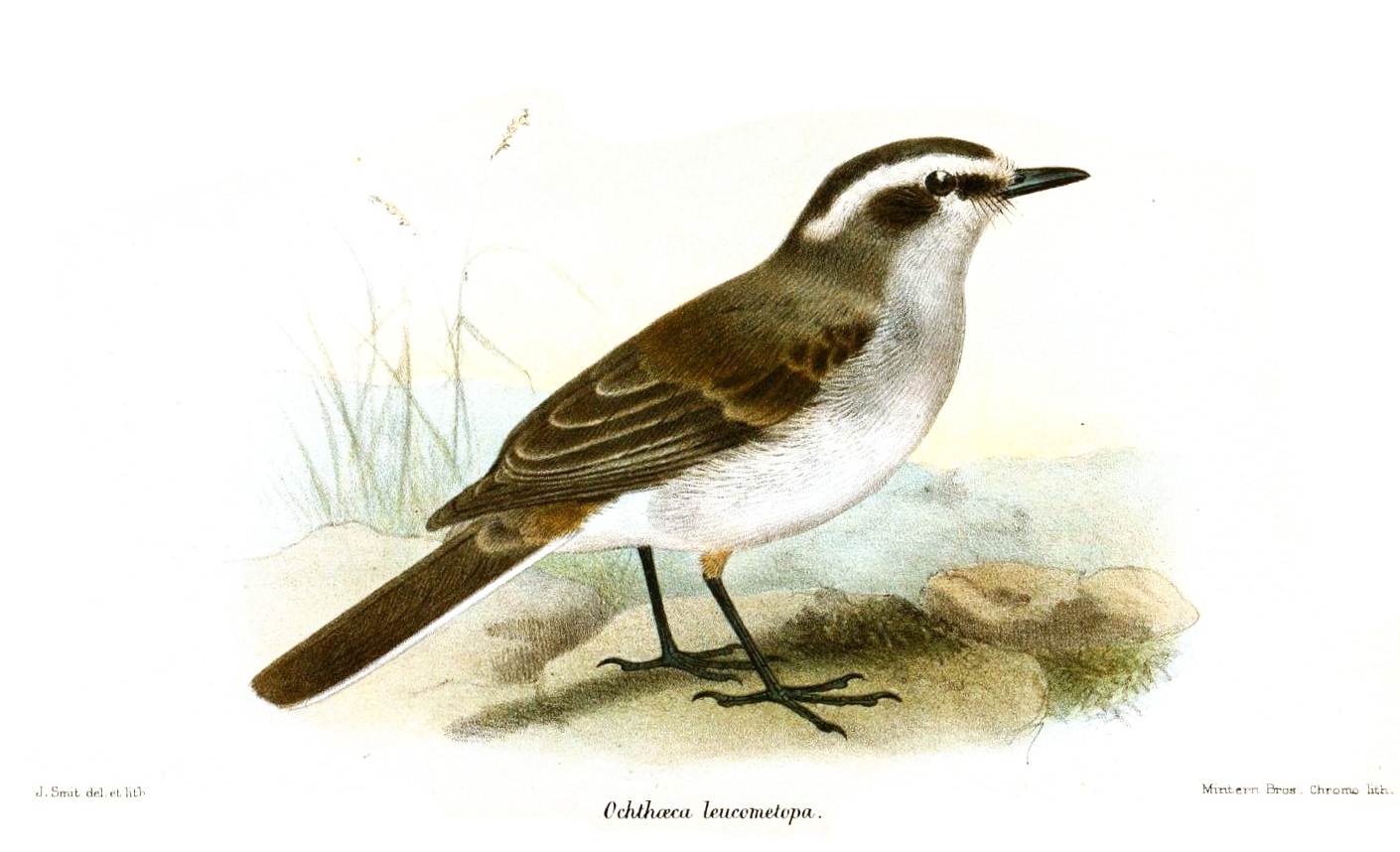
- Illustration by Joseph Smit, 1888

Conservation status
- Least Concern (IUCN 3.1)

Scientific classification
- Kingdom: Animalia
- Phylum: Chordata
- Class: Aves
- Order: Passeriformes
- Family: Tyrannidae
- Genus: Ochthoeca
- Species: O. leucophrys

Binomial name
- Ochthoeca leucophrys (d'Orbigny & Lafresnaye, 1837)

= White-browed chat-tyrant =

Species of bird

The white-browed chat-tyrant (Ochthoeca leucophrys) is a species of bird in the family Tyrannidae, the tyrant flycatchers. It is found in Argentina, Bolivia, Chile, Ecuador, and Peru.

== Taxonomy and systematics ==
The white-browed chat-tyrant was originally described as "F[luvicola] leucophrys".

The white-browed chat-tyrant has these six subspecies:

- O. l. dissors Zimmer, JT, 1940
- O. l. interior Zimmer, JT, 1930
- O. l. urubambae Zimmer, JT, 1937
- O. l. leucometopa Sclater, PL & Salvin, 1877
- O. l. leucophrys (d'Orbigny & Lafresnaye, 1837)
- O. l. tucumana Berlepsch, 1906

During much of the first half of the twentieth century, what is now the Piura chat-tyrant (O. piurae) was considered an additional subspecies, and at least one publication suggests that it should return to that status. The white-browed and Piura chat-tyrants form a superspecies. In addition, it has been suggested that urubambae be merged into interior.

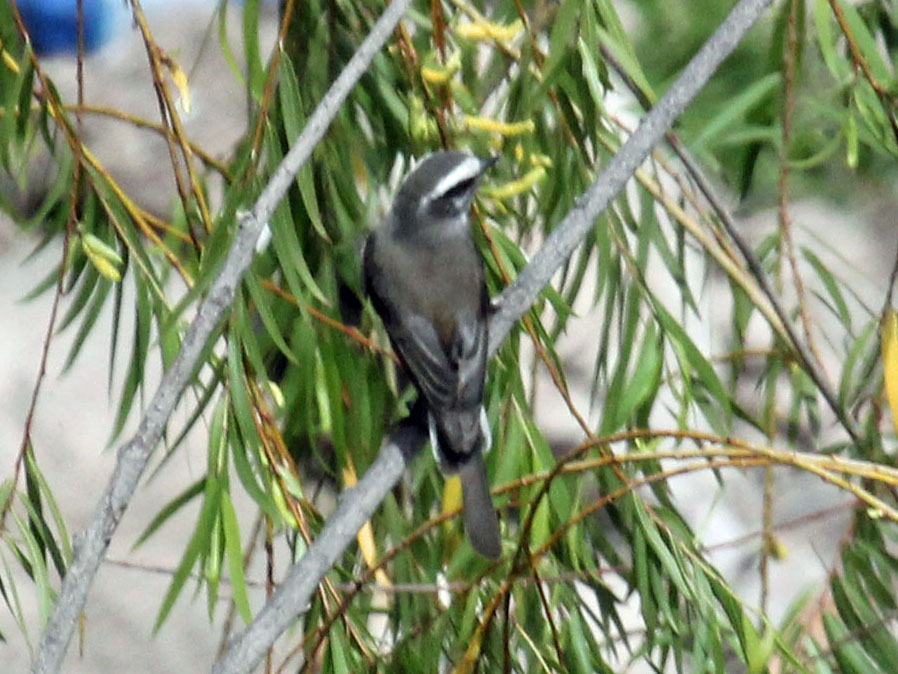
At Machu Picchu, Peru

== Description ==
The white-browed chat-tyrant is 14.5 to 15.5 cm (5.7 to 6.1 in) long. The sexes have the same plumage. Adults of the nominate subspecies O. l. leucophrys have a dark gray to grayish brown crown, a wide white supercilium that begins at the lores and extends well past the eye, and a blackish "mask". Their upperparts are a slightly lighter gray to grayish brown than the crown with a slight cinnamon tinge on the lower back and rump. Their wings are a duskier gray with two faint cinnamon wing bars. Their tail is dusky with white outer webs on the outermost feathers. Their throat and underparts are pale gray that becomes whitish on the crissum. Juveniles have a brownish overall tinge with conspicuous wing bars.

The other subspecies of the white-browed chat-tyrant differ from the nominate and each other thus:

- O. l. leucometopa: darker upperparts than nominate with no cinnamon, and white edges on the remiges
- O. l. urubambae: like leucometopa with a slightly paler crown
- O. l. interior: like urubambae but overall slightly darker
- O. l. dissors: intermediate between urubambae and interior
- O. l. tucumana: more cinnamon on back and rump than nominate with more distinct wing bars and slightly paler underparts

== Distribution and habitat ==
The white-browed chat-tyrant is a bird of the western Andean highlands. The subspecies are found thus:

- O. l. dissors: southern Azuay and northern Loja provinces in far southern Ecuador and in the upper valley of the Maranon River in northern Peru
- O. l. interior: Huánuco and Pasco departments in central Peru
- O. l. urubambae: central and southern Peru from Junín Department south to northeastern Ayacucho and Cuzco departments
- O. l. leucometopa: from Ancash Department in western Peru south to far northern Chile's Arica y Parinacota Region
- O. l. leucophrys: western Bolivia
- O. l. tucumana: northwestern Argentina from Salta Province south to San Juan Province

The white-browed chat-tyrant inhabits dry montane forest and Polylepis woodlands. It favors ravines, gorges, and grassy slopes and is often found near water such as along streams. It also often occurs in cultivated areas that have hedgerows. In elevation it is found between 2,200 and 2,800 m (7,200 and 9,200 ft) in Ecuador, between 2,400 and 4,200 m (7,900 and 13,800 ft) in Peru, and between 2,000 and 3,500 m (6,600 and 11,500 ft) in Bolivia and Argentina.

== Behavior ==
=== Movement ===
The white-browed chat-tyrant is a year-round resident.

=== Feeding ===
The white-browed chat-tyrant feeds on insects. It usually forages singly or in pairs. It perches in the open, upright on a bush, and takes prey mostly in mid-air and sometimes with a sally to the ground. It often returns to the same perch after a capture.

=== Breeding ===
The white-browed chat-tyrant's breeding season has not been fully defined but appears to span October to January in Peru and November to February in Argentina. The one known nest was an open cup made from small twigs lined with feathers, hair, and wool. It was placed in a clump of grass near a stream on the side of a ravine. It contained one egg. Nothing else is known about the species' breeding biology.

=== Vocalization ===
What is thought to be the white-browed chat-tyrant's song is "a squeaky chatter, usually in [a] duet: wu-chew'widdu". Its calls are "a squeaky, rising-falling weeo and a higher weedee?". In Argentina it makes "a sharp keeew".

== Status ==
The IUCN has assessed the white-browed chat-tyrant as being of Least Concern. It has a very large range; its population size is not known and is believed to be stable. No immediate threats have been identified. It is considered "rare and local" in Ecuador and "common and widespread" in Peru. It occurs in national parks in Peru and Bolivia.
