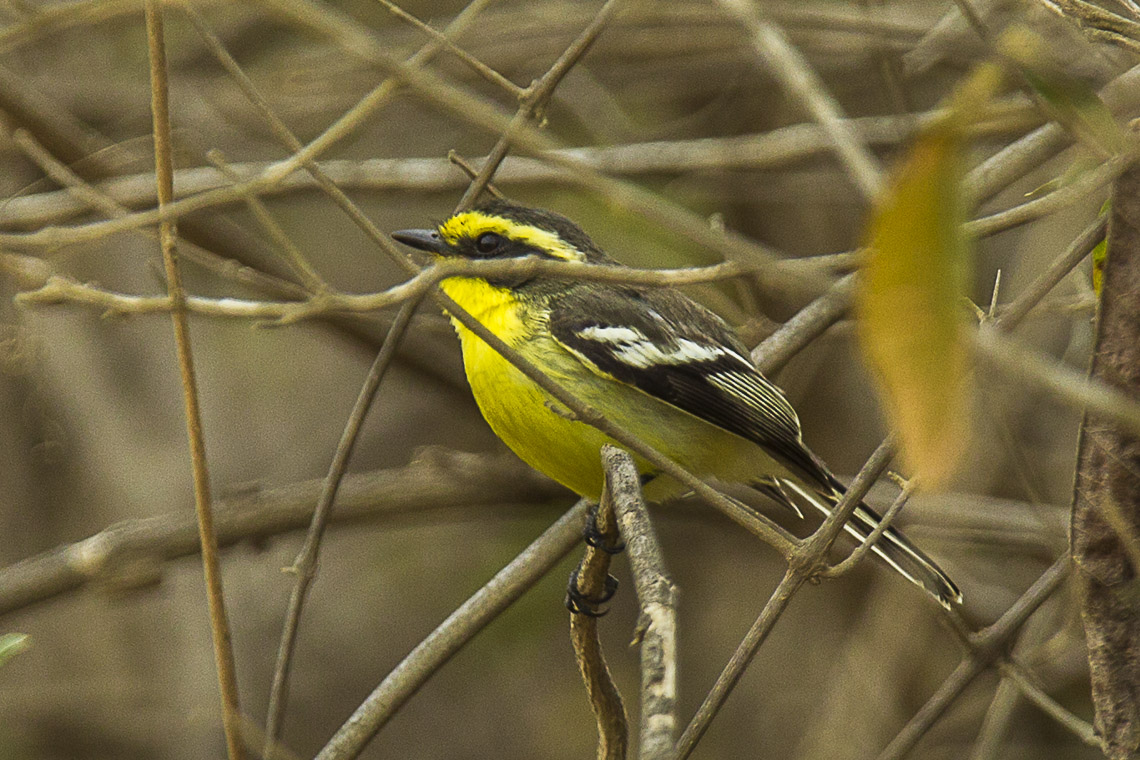

Conservation status
- Near Threatened (IUCN 3.1)

Scientific classification
- Kingdom: Animalia
- Phylum: Chordata
- Class: Aves
- Order: Passeriformes
- Family: Tyrannidae
- Genus: Ochthoeca; Chapman, 1925
- Species: O. salvini

Binomial name
- Ochthoeca salvini Taczanowski, 1877

Synonyms
- Ochthoeca salvini Taczanowski, 1877; Tumbezia salvini

= Tumbes tyrant =

Species of bird

The Tumbes tyrant (Ochthoeca salvini) is a Near Threatened species of bird in the family Tyrannidae, the tyrant flycatchers. It found in Ecuador and Peru.

== Taxonomy and systematics ==
The taxonomy of the Tumbes tyrant is unsettled. It was formally described in 1877 by Wladyslaw Taczanowski as Ochthoeca salvini. The Clements taxonomy, BirdLife International's Handbook of the Birds of the World (HBW), the Cornell Lab of Ornithology's Birds of the World (which mostly uses Clements taxonomy) and AviList retain it in genus Ochthoeca. Clements and Cornell use the English name Tumbes chat-tyrant for consistency with the other members of that genus; HBW and AviList call it the Tumbes tyrant. The South American Classification Committee of the American Ornithological Society have long separated it in genus Tumbezia and call it the Tumbes tyrant.

The Tumbes tyrant is placed in the genus Ochthoeca and has no subspecies.

== Description ==
The Tumbes tyrant is about 13.5 cm (5.3 in) long. The sexes have the same plumage. Adults have a dark gray crown, lores, and ear coverts. Their forecrown is bright yellow and fades to whitish along its supercilium. Their upperparts are gray or grayish olive. Their wings are mostly dusky black with white edges on the secondaries and tertials and white tips on the coverts; the last show as two wide wing bars. Their tail is mostly blackish with white edges on the outer feathers. Their throat and underparts are lemon yellow. They have a dark brown iris, a short black bill, and black legs and feet.

== Distribution and habitat ==
The Tumbes tyrant is primarily found in northwestern Peru from Tumbes Department south to La Libertad Department. It also occurs in extreme southwestern Ecuador, where it was first discovered in Loja Province in late 2008. It inhabits arid woodlands and scrublands where it favors groves of Acacia and Prosopis mesquite and is often found near dry watercourses. It mostly occurs below about 200 m (700 ft) but locally is found between 540 and 800 m (1,800 and 2,600 ft) and in a few locations in Peru reaches 1,000 m (3,300 ft).

== Behavior ==
=== Movement ===
The Tumbes tyrant is mostly a year-round resident though its occasional appearance at higher elevations hints at some movement.

=== Feeding ===
The Tumbes tyrant feeds on insects. It typically forages singly or in pairs. It perches fairly low, often inconspicuously in vegetation, and sallies to glean prey from vegetation or to capture it in mid-air by hawking.

=== Breeding ===
Nothing is known about the Tumbes tyrant's breeding biology.

=== Vocalization ===
What is thought to be the Tumbes tyrant's song is "a quiet, mellow rapid chatter, dyer'rYr'r, sometimes ending with a higher note, and occasionally interspersed with a shorter DEE'dew". Its calls are "a more emphatic, squeaky PSI'dyer'r'r'r and a clear, descending pew".

== Status ==
The IUCN has assessed the Tumbes tyrannulet as Near Threatened. It has a limited range and its estimated population of between 1000 and 2500 mature individuals is believed to be decreasing. "Habitat destruction is the principal threat, with selective logging, understorey clearance, loss of riverine thickets to irrigated agriculture, large-scale agriculture in the coastal plains and over-grazing by goats the main processes." It is considered "locally fairly common" in Peru. It occurs in at least one protected area in that country.
