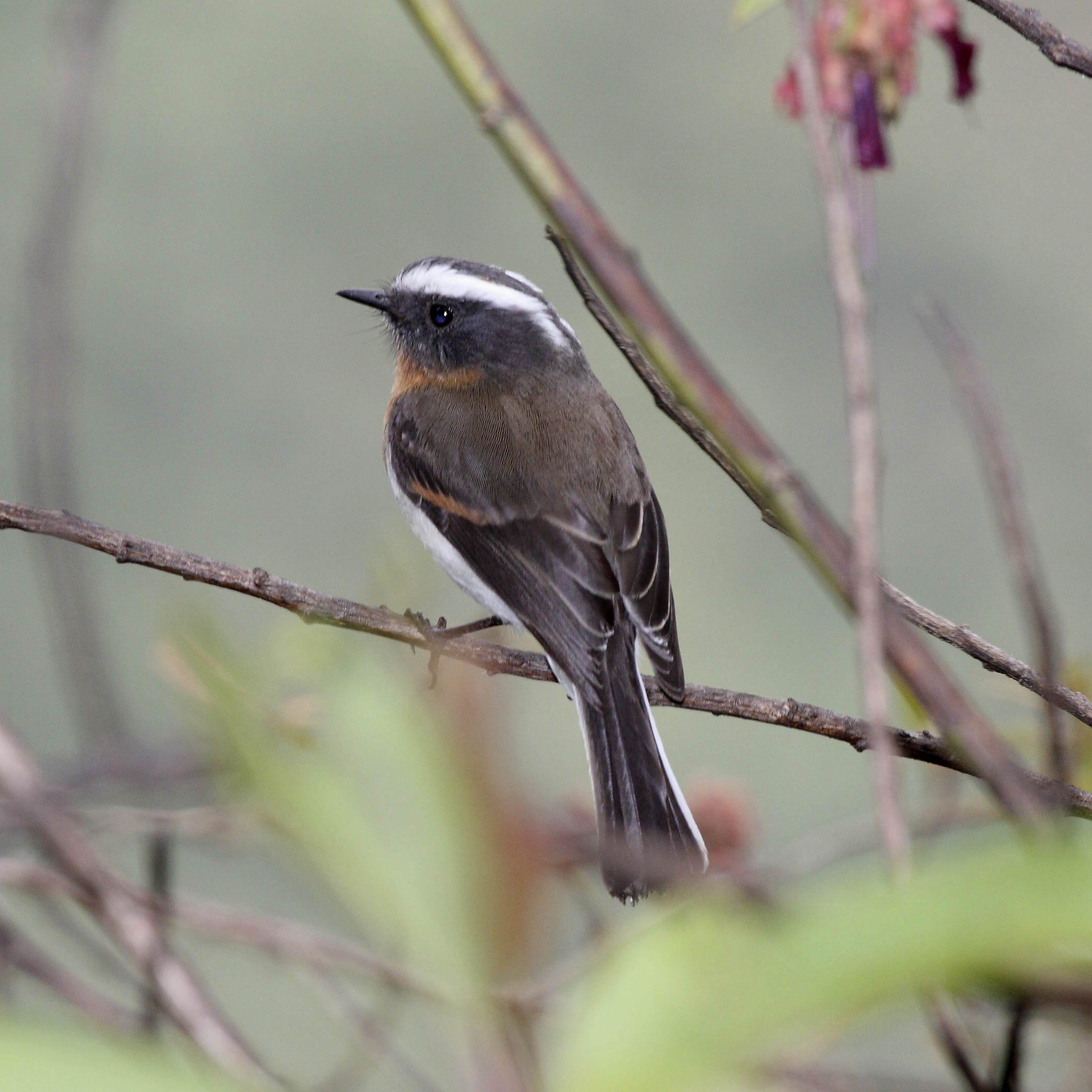

Conservation status
- Least Concern (IUCN 3.1)

Scientific classification
- Kingdom: Animalia
- Phylum: Chordata
- Class: Aves
- Order: Passeriformes
- Family: Tyrannidae
- Genus: Ochthoeca
- Species: O. rufipectoralis

Binomial name
- Ochthoeca rufipectoralis (D'Orbigny & Lafresnaye, 1837)

= Rufous-breasted chat-tyrant =

Species of bird

The rufous-breasted chat-tyrant (Ochthoeca rufipectoralis) is a species of bird in the family Tyrannidae, the tyrant flycatchers. It is found in Bolivia, Colombia, Ecuador, Peru, and Venezuela.

== Taxonomy and systematics ==
The rufous-breasted chat-tyrant was formally described in 1837 as Fluvicola rufi-pectoralis.

The rufous-breasted chat-tyrant has these seven subspecies:

- O. r. poliogastra Salvin & Godman, 1880
- O. r. rubicundula Wetmore, 1946
- O. r. obfuscata Zimmer, JT, 1942
- O. r. rufopectus (Lesson, RP, 1844)
- O. r. centralis Hellmayr, 1927
- O. r. tectricialis Chapman, 1921
- O. r. rufipectoralis (D'Orbigny & Lafresnaye, 1837)

However, these assignments are not believed to be final, as there are intermediate forms that have not been extensively documented.

== Description ==
The rufous-breasted chat-tyrant is 12.5 to 14 cm (4.9 to 5.5 in) long and weighs about 13 g (0.46 oz). The sexes have the same plumage. Adults of the nominate subspecies O. r. rufipectoralis have a sooty brown head with white above the bill that extends into a long wide white supercilium. Their upperparts are brown to sooty brown. Their wings are blackish with faint rufous or cinnamon-buff edges on the secondaries and tertials. Their tail is blackish with thin white edges on the outermost feathers. Their chin and throat are grayish, their lower throat and breast dark rufous-orange, and their belly white.

The other subspecies of the rufous-breasted chat-tyrant differ from the nominate and each other thus:

- O. r. poliogastra: crown is same brown as back, has a wide rufous wing bar; narrower and paler rufous-orange breast and grayer underparts than nominate
- O. r. rubicundula: very similar to poliogastra
- O. r. rufopectus: very similar to poliogastra
- O. r. obfuscata: more visible pale edges on tertials than nominate; one or two rufous wing bars
- O. r. centralis: like obfuscata with a darker breast
- O. r. tectricialis: highly variable; intermediate between obfuscata and centralis where their respective ranges overlap

All subspecies have a dark brown iris, a short, thin, black bill, and black legs and feet.

== Distribution and habitat ==
The rufous-breasted chat-tyrant is primarily a bird of the Andes, where it is found on both the eastern and western slopes, and is also found in some smaller isolated mountain ranges. It has a disjunct distribution. The subspecies are found thus:

- O. r. poliogastra: Sierra Nevada de Santa Marta in northern Colombia
- O. r. rubicundula: Serranía del Perijá that straddles the Colombia-Venezuela border
- O. r. obfuscata: from Colombia's Central and Western Andes south through Ecuador into northern Peru's Piura, Cajamarca, and Amazonas departments
- O. r. rufopectus: Colombia's Eastern Andes
- O. r. centralis: north-central Peru's La Libertad, Ancash, and Huánuco departments
- O. r. tectricialis: south-central Peru from Pasco to central Cuzco department
- O. r. rufipectoralis: from Peru's southeastern Cuzco and northern Puno departments into western Bolivia as far as western Santa Cruz Department

The rufous-breasted chat-tyrant primarily inhabits the edges of montane forest, cloudforest, and Polylepis woodlands in the temperate zone. It also occurs in scrubbier and stunted forest near tree line, especially in Venezuela. In elevation it ranges between 2,750 and 3,100 m (9,000 and 10,200 ft) in Venezuela, between 2,600 and 3,200 m (8,500 and 10,500 ft) in Colombia, mostly between 2,500 and 3,300 m (8,200 and 10,800 ft) in Ecuador, and between 2,300 and 4,100 m (7,500 and 13,500 ft) in Peru though it is rare at the higher elevations there.

== Behavior ==
=== Movement ===
The rufous-breasted chat-tyrant is a year-round resident.

=== Feeding ===
The rufous-breasted chat-tyrant feeds on insects. It usually forages singly or in pairs and often joins mixed-species feeding flocks. It perches upright, usually in an open or a semi-open spot between the forest's mid-level and its subcanopy. It captures prey with sallies from the perch, usually to hover-glean from foliage but also to take it in mid-air.

=== Breeding ===
The rufous-breasted chat-tyrant's breeding season has not been fully defined. It is known to span from January to September in Colombia and include October and November in Peru. Its nest is typically a cup made of moss placed on a rock ledge and often partly hidden by small trees. The clutch size, incubation period, time to fledging, and details of parental care are not known.

=== Vocalization ===
The rufous-breasted chat-tyrant's day song differs somewhat among the subspecies. The nominate subspecies' is "a high buzzy phrased followed by a buzzy whistle, in series: tsi'jiot tzee...tsi'jit tzee.... In Colombia it is "an abrupt ch-brrr, ch-brrr, ch-brrr". The species' dawn song appears to be uniform, described in general as "tirip, wee-eeuww, tirip, weeeeuw" and in Ecuador as "tirip, weéuw, tirip, weéuw...". Its calls also appear fairly universal, "a low, buzzy, chattered phrase in a short series: bzzter or bzz'tee" though O. r. tectricialis also makes "drier, buzzier tzzz phrases".

== Status ==
The IUCN has assessed the rufous-breasted chat-tyrant as being of Least Concern. It has a very large range; its population size is not known and is believed to be decreasing. No immediate threats have been identified. It is considered "fairly common" in Venezuela, "common" in Colombia, and "fairly common and widespread" in Peru. In Ecuador it is more common on the eastern slope than the western. It occurs in most of the national parks within its range.
