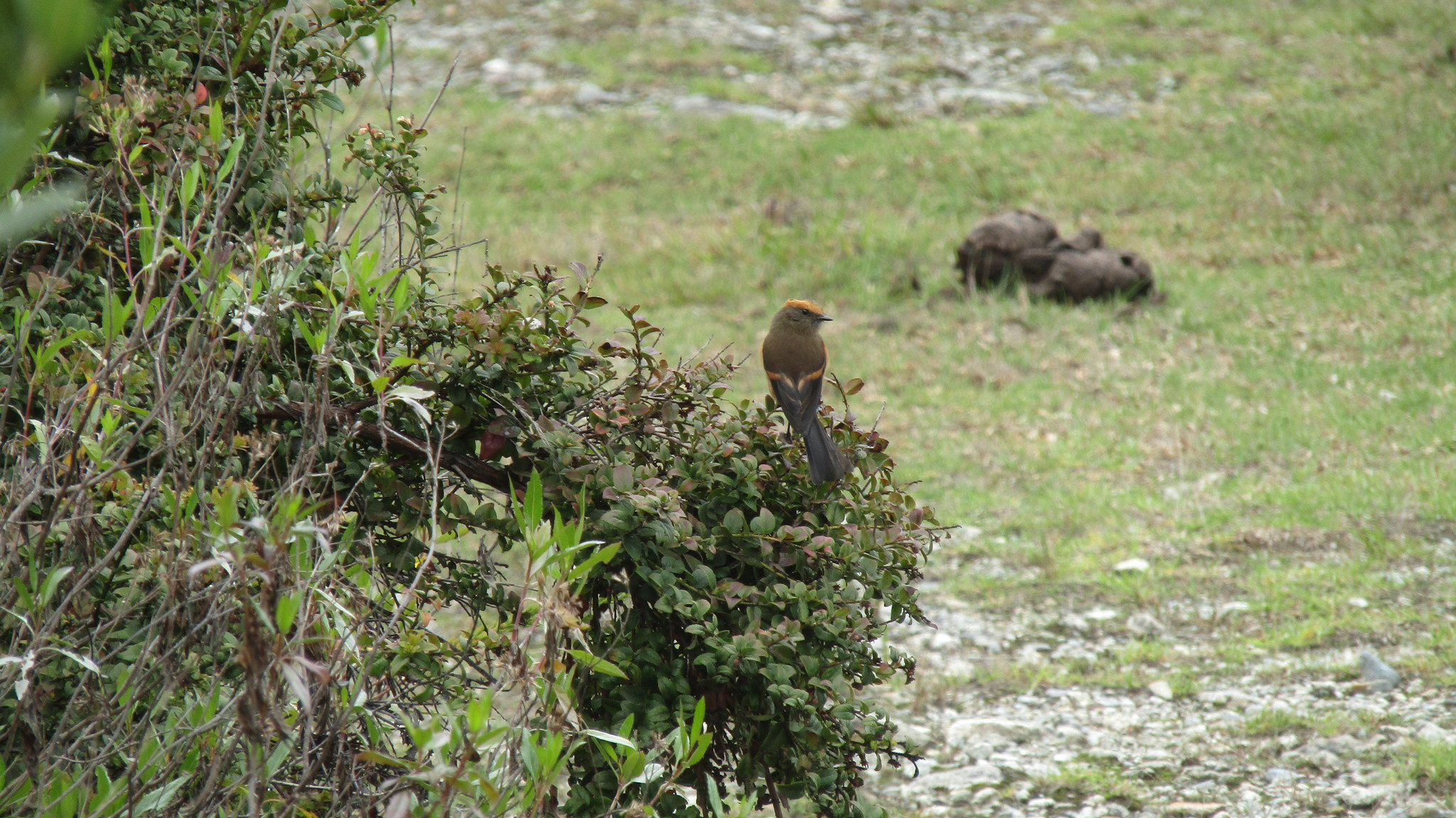

Conservation status
- Least Concern (IUCN 3.1)

Scientific classification
- Kingdom: Animalia
- Phylum: Chordata
- Class: Aves
- Order: Passeriformes
- Family: Tyrannidae
- Genus: Ochthoeca
- Species: O. superciliosa

Binomial name
- Ochthoeca superciliosa Sclater & Salvin, 1871

Synonyms
- Ochthoeca fumicolor superciliosa

= Rufous-browed chat-tyrant =

Species of bird

The rufous-browed chat-tyrant (Ochthoeca superciliosa) is a species of bird in the family Tyrannidae, the tyrant flycatchers. It is endemic to Venezuela.

== Taxonomy and systematics ==
The rufous-browed chat-tyrant's taxonomy is unsettled. It was originally described in 1870 as a species and at least one author early in the twentieth century continued to recognize it as one. However, until into the twenty-first century most taxonomists treated it as a subspecies of the brown-backed chat-tyrant (Ochthoeca fumicolor). BirdLife International's Handbook of the Birds of the World (HBW) again recognized superciliosa as a species in 2016, the Clements taxonomy in 2022, and the IOC in 2023. As of March 2025 the South American Classification Committee of the American Ornithological Society (SACC) retains it as a subspecies of the brown-backed chat-tyrant.

The rufous-browed chat-tyrant is monotypic.

== Description ==
The rufous-browed chat-tyrant is 14.5 to 16 cm (5.7 to 6.3 in) long and weighs about 14 to 15 g (0.49 to 0.53 oz). The sexes appear to have the same plumage. Adults have a brown crown and bright rufous supercilium that begins at the lores and widens past the eye. The rest of their face is dark brown. Their upperparts are brown. Their wings are dusky with rufous tips to the coverts that form one or two prominent wing bars. Their tail is dusky with white outer webs of the outermost feathers. Their throat is grayish to rich olive, the center of their belly and undertail coverts whitish, and the rest of their underparts bright chestnut-rufous. They have a dark brown iris, a smallish black bill, and black legs and feet. Juveniles have a paler and more ochraceous supercilium, narrower and paler wing bars, and a paler throat and belly than adults.

== Distribution and habitat ==
The rufous-browed chat-tyrant is found in the Andes of western Venezuela from northern Táchira north through Mérida and most of Trujillo. It inhabits stunted montane forest up to tree line, Polylepis woodlands, and shrubby paramo. It also occurs in pastures with shrubby borders. In elevation it ranges between 2,200 and 4,200 m (7,200 and 13,800 ft) with most records above 2,700 m (8,900 ft).

== Behavior ==
=== Movement ===
The rufous-browed chat-tyrant is a year-round resident though some local elevational movements have been noted.

=== Feeding ===
The rufous-browed chat-tyrant feeds on insects, though details are lacking. It usually forages singly or in pairs. It perches upright, in wooded areas on branches near the trunk and in open areas on stumps, fence posts, shrubs, and clumps of grass. It captures most prey in mid-air or near the ground ("hawking") but sometimes takes it from leaves or the ground while briefly hovering.

=== Breeding ===
The rufous-browed chat-tyrant's breeding season has not been detailed but is known to include March. The two known nests were cups lined with seed fluff and rabbit fur respectively but otherwise not described. One was placed in a cavity in an Espeletia plant and the other in a niche in an earthen bank. Nothing else is known about the species' breeding biology.

=== Vocalization ===
As of June 2025 xeno-canto had no recordings of rufous-browed chat-tyrant vocalizations; the Cornell Lab of Ornithology's Macaulay Library had nine. Its dawn song is "a fast, rhythmic, duet plee, plít'ter'tew, plít'ter'tew..., chattery, up to 12 phrases slowing at [the] end". The song has some variations such as "cháp'pa'cháp'pa or cháp'it'dip!". The species also sings soft notes from a perch or in flight. Its calls include "a high-pitched tsiu, a soft prip, or a clear whistled kleeeip".

== Status ==
The IUCN has assessed the rufous-browed chat-tyrant as being of Least Concern. It has a small range; its population size is not known and is believed to be stable. No immediate threats have been identified. It is considered common. "No effects of human activity on Rufous-browed Chat-Tyrant have been directly measured, but burning and clearing of Polylepis woodlands, for firewood and cattle grazing, are undoubtedly detrimentally impacting this species."
