= Blackish chat-tyrant =

Conservation status
- Least Concern (IUCN 3.1)

Scientific classification
- Kingdom: Animalia
- Phylum: Chordata
- Class: Aves
- Order: Passeriformes
- Family: Tyrannidae
- Genus: Ochthoeca
- Species: O. nigrita

Binomial name
- Ochthoeca nigrita Sclater, PL & Salvin, 1871

Species of bird

The blackish chat-tyrant (Ochthoeca nigrita) is a species of passerine bird in the family Tyrannidae, the tyrant flycatchers. It is endemic to Venezuela.

== Taxonomy and systematics ==
The blackish chat-tyrant was formally described in 1871 as Ochthoeca nigrita, its current binomial. It was later treated as conspecific with the slaty-backed chat-tyrant (O. cinnamomeiventris) and the maroon-belted chat-tyrant (O. thoracica). A study published in 1998 suggested that each of them should be raised to full species level. By 2006 the IOC had recognized the blackish chat-tyrant as a species. BirdLife International's Handbook of the Birds of the World (HBW) recognized it in 2016 and the Clements taxonomy in 2022. However, the South American Classification Committee of the American Ornithological Society retains the blackish chat-tyrant as a subspecies of the slaty-backed.

The blackish chat-tyrant is monotypic.

== Description ==
The blackish chat-tyrant is about 12 cm (4.7 in) long. The sexes have the same plumage. Adults are almost entirely slate black with the exception of a white streak from above the lores to behind the eye. They have a dark brown or blackish iris, a short, thin, black bill, and blackish to dark dusky gray legs and feet. Juveniles have a thinner white streak than adults, with a pale rufous wash on the upperparts and browner underparts.

== Distribution and habitat ==
The blackish chat-tyrant is found in the Andes of western Venezuela from the Paramo el Zumbador in Táchira north to northern Mérida and northwestern Barinas. It inhabits dense vegetation along mountain streams in steep ravines and adjoining humid and wet montane forest. In elevation it ranges mostly between 1,900 and 2,900 m (6,200 and 9,500 ft) with some sight records as low as 1,500 m (4,900 ft).

== Behavior ==
=== Movement ===
The blackish chat-tyrant is a year-round resident.

=== Feeding ===
The blackish chat-tyrant's diet is not known but is believed to be entirely small invertebrates. It typically forages singly or in pairs and does not join mixed-species feeding flocks. It perches on a low branch or vine along a watercourse and make aerial sallies from it to take prey in mid-air, often returning to the same perch.

=== Breeding ===
The blackish chat-tyrant's breeding biology has not been studied. It is assumed to be very similar to that of the slaty-backed chat-tyrant, which see here.

=== Vocalization ===
As of May 2025 xeno-canto had a single recording of a blackish chat-tyrant vocalization; the Cornell Lab's Macaulay Library had 13 others. Its voice is heard infrequently, a "rather loud, buzzy whistle, abrupt and slightly descending". It has been written as "tsEEeuw".

== Status ==
The IUCN has assessed the blackish chat-tyrant as being of Least Concern. It has a small range; its population size is not known and is believed to be stable. No immediate threats have been identified. It is considered "uncommon and local".
