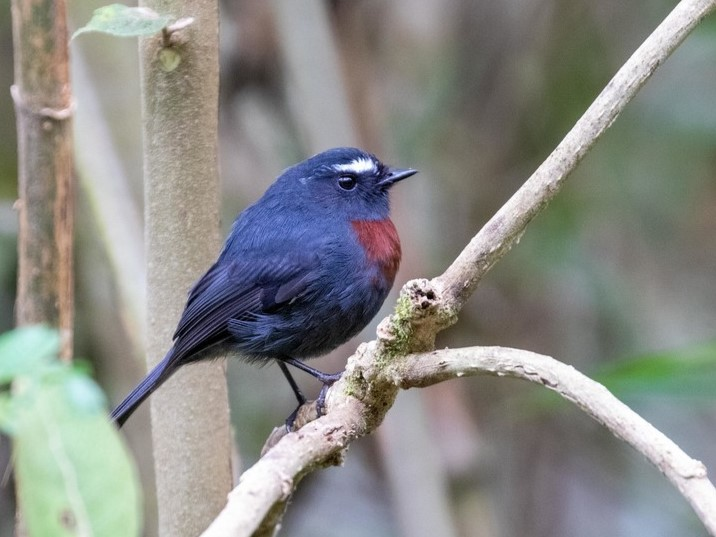

Conservation status
- Least Concern (IUCN 3.1)

Scientific classification
- Kingdom: Animalia
- Phylum: Chordata
- Class: Aves
- Order: Passeriformes
- Family: Tyrannidae
- Genus: Ochthoeca
- Species: O. thoracica

Binomial name
- Ochthoeca thoracica Taczanowski, 1874

Synonyms
- See text

= Maroon-belted chat-tyrant =

Subspecies of bird

The maroon-belted chat-tyrant, or chestnut-belted chat-tyrant, (Ochthoeca thoracica) is a species of bird in the family Tyrannidae, the tyrant flycatchers. It is found in Bolivia and Peru.

== Taxonomy and systematics ==
The maroon-belted chat-tyrant was formally described in 1874 as Ochthoeca thoracica, its current binomial. It was later treated as conspecific with the slaty-backed chat-tyrant (O. cinnamomeiventris) and the blackish chat-tyrant (O. nigrita). A study published in 1998 suggested that each of them should be raised to full species level. By 2006 the IOC had recognized the maroon-belted chat-tyrant as a species. BirdLife International's Handbook of the Birds of the World (HBW) recognized it in 2016 and the Clements taxonomy in 2022. However, the South American Classification Committee of the American Ornithological Society retains the maroon-belted chat-tyrant as a subspecies of the slaty-backed.

The maroon-belted chat-tyrant has two subspecies, the nominate O. t. thoracica (Taczanowski, 1874) and O. t. angustifasciata (Chapman, 1926).

== Description ==
The maroon-belted chat-tyrant is 13 to 13.5 cm (5.1 to 5.3 in) long and weighs about 11 to 16 g (0.39 to 0.56 oz). The sexes have the same plumage. Adults of the nominate subspecies have a slaty to blackish head with a white supercilium. Their upperparts and tail are slaty to blackish. Their wings are slaty to blackish with a slight dark brownish tinge. Their throat and upper breast are blackish, the rest of their breast deep chestnut, and their belly and undertail coverts gray. Subspecies O. t. angustifasciata is very similar to the nominate but has a narrower chestnut band on the breast. Both subspecies have a dark brown or blackish iris, a short, thin, black bill, and blackish to dark dusky gray legs and feet.

== Distribution and habitat ==
Subspecies O. t. angustifasciata of the maroon-belted chat-tyrant is the more northerly of the two. It is found entirely in Peru, from south of the Maranon River in southern Amazonas Department and slightly north of it in eastern Cajamarca Department south on the eastern Andean slope to southwestern San Martín Department. The nominate subspecies is found on the eastern slope from San Martín into Bolivia to western Santa Cruz Department. The species inhabits dense humid montane forest where it is almost always found along watercourses. In elevation it ranges mostly between 1,600 and 3,300 m (5,200 and 10,800 ft) but locallyccurs as low as 1,200 m (3,900 ft).

== Behavior ==
=== Movement ===
The maroon-belted chat-tyrant is believed to be a year-round resident.

=== Feeding ===
The maroon-belted chat-tyrant's diet is not known but is believed to be mostly or entirely small invertebrates. It perches on a low branch or vine along a watercourse and take prey with aerial sallies from it to glean from vegetation or take it in mid-air, often returning to the same perch.

=== Breeding ===
The maroon-belted chat-tyrant's breeding biology is poorly known. It appears to breed between February and August in Peru. Photographs of a nest show it, its placement, and eggs to be similar to those of the slaty-backed chat-tyrant, which see here. The clutch size, incubation period, time to fledging, and details of parental care are not known.

=== Vocalization ===
The maroon-belted chat-tyrant's song is "a high, descending, whistled tseeew often followed by a squeaky tsee-tsip". Its call is "a chatter, sometimes given in duet: tsee-tsikit tsikit tsikit".

== Status ==
The IUCN has assessed the slaty-backed chat-tyrant as being of Least Concern. It has a large range; its population size is not known and is believed to be decreasing. No immediate threats have been identified. It is considered uncommon in Peru. It occurs in at least one national park in each of Peru and Bolivia.
