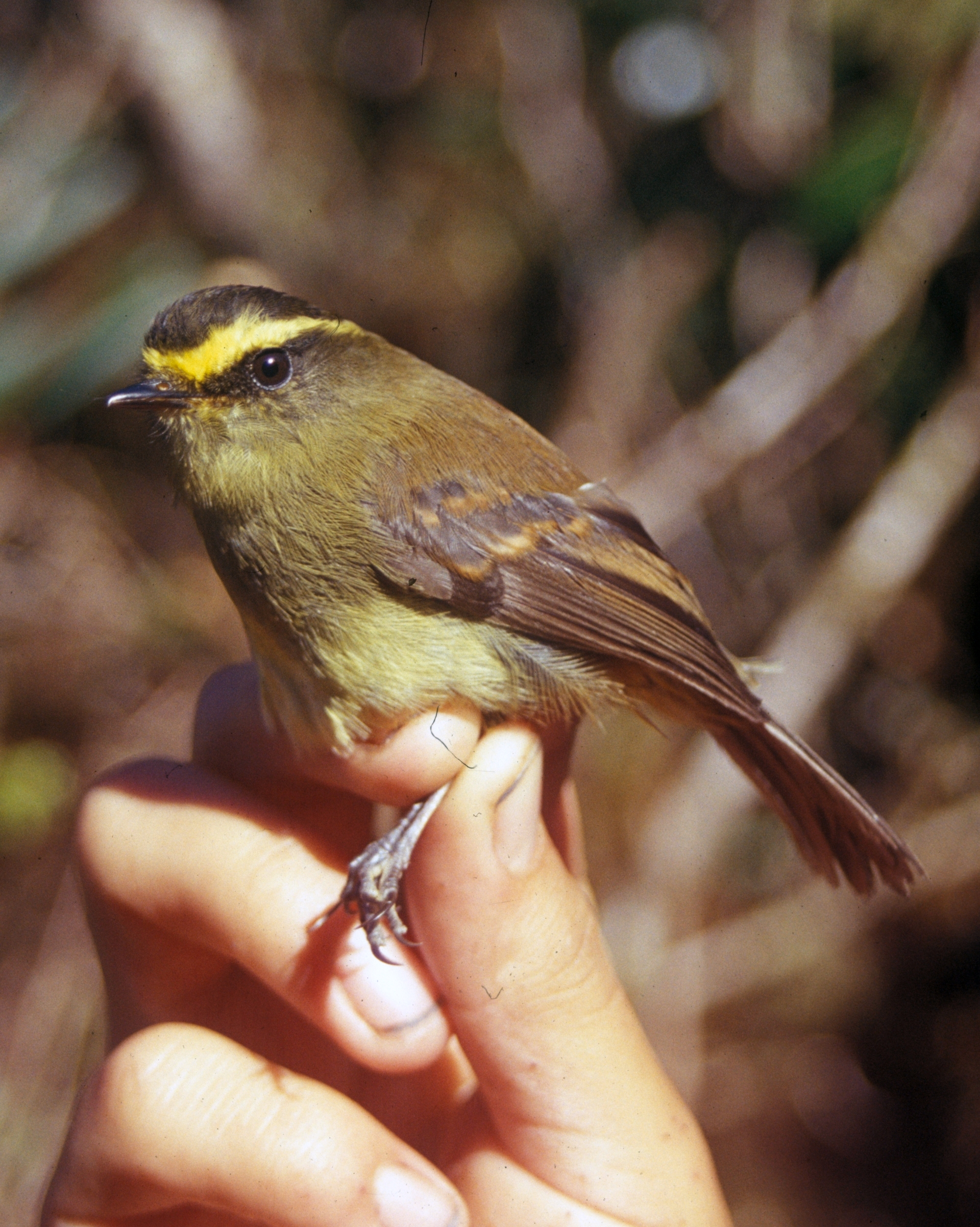
- Yellow-bellied chat-tyrant (Silvicultrix diadema)

Scientific classification
- Kingdom: Animalia
- Phylum: Chordata
- Class: Aves
- Order: Passeriformes
- Family: Tyrannidae
- Genus: Silvicultrix; Lanyon, W, 1986

Type species
- Myiobius diadema Hartlaub, 1843

Species
- see text

= Silvicultrix =

Genus of birds

Silvicultrix is a genus of South American birds in the tyrant flycatcher family Tyrannidae.

The genus was erected by the American ornithologist Wesley E. Lanyon in 1986 with the yellow-bellied chat-tyrant (Silvicultrix diadema) as the type species.

== Species ==
The genus contains five species:

Image	Common name	Scientific name	Distribution
	Crowned chat-tyrant	Silvicultrix frontalis	Bolivia, Colombia, Ecuador, and Peru.
	Kalinowski's chat-tyrant	Silvicultrix spodionota	Bolivia and Peru
	Golden-browed chat-tyrant	Silvicultrix pulchella	Yungas of Peru and Bolivia.
	Yellow-bellied chat-tyrant	Silvicultrix diadema	Colombia, Ecuador, Peru, and Venezuela.
	Jelski's chat-tyrant	Silvicultrix jelskii	Peru and southern Ecuador.

These species were formerly included in the genus Ochthoeca.
