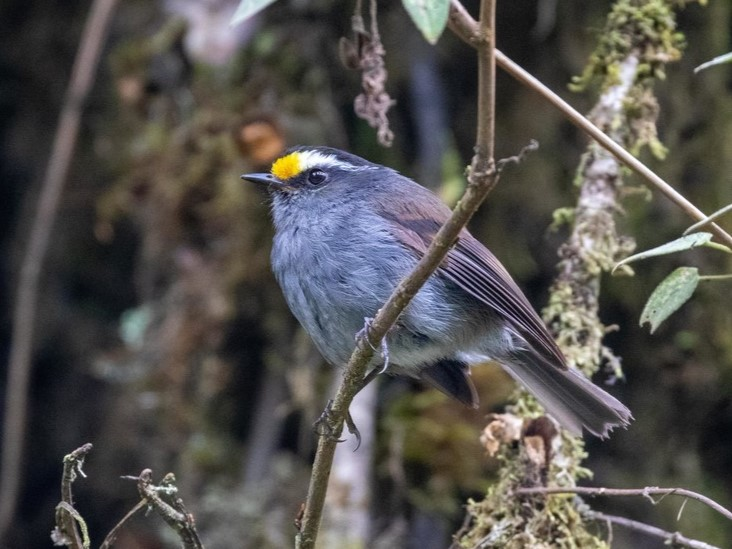

Conservation status
- Least Concern (IUCN 3.1)

Scientific classification
- Kingdom: Animalia
- Phylum: Chordata
- Class: Aves
- Order: Passeriformes
- Family: Tyrannidae
- Genus: Silvicultrix
- Species: S. frontalis

Binomial name
- Silvicultrix frontalis (Lafresnaye, 1847)
- Ranges of the crowned chat-tyrant (Colombia to far northern Peru) and Kalinowski's chat-tyrant (north-central Peru to Bolivia). See the Taxonomy section for more.

= Crowned chat-tyrant =

Species of bird

The crowned chat-tyrant (Silvicultrix frontalis) is a species of bird in the family Tyrannidae, the tyrant flycatchers. It is found in Colombia, Ecuador, and Peru.

== Taxonomy and systematics ==
The crowned chat-tyrant was formally described in 1847 by Frédéric de Lafresnaye as Tyrannula frontalis. In 1966 Meyer de Schauensee placed it in genus Ochthoeca. Wesley Lanyon moved it to Silvicultrix when he erected that genus in 1986. The IOC adopted the change in 2009. BirdLife International's Handbook of the Birds of the World (HBW) adopted the change in 2016, the Clements taxonomy in 2022, and the South American Classification Committee of the American Ornithological Society (SACC) in 2023.

The crowned chat-tyrant's further taxonomy is unsettled. The IOC assigns it two subspecies, the nominate S. f. frontalis (Lafresnaye, 1847) and S. f. albidiadema (Lafresnaye, 1848). The SACC, Clements, and HBW include two more, S. f. spondionota and S. f. boliviana, that the IOC treats as the separate species Kalinowski's chat-tyrant (S. spodionota). Clements does separate the two pairs within its one species as "crowned chat-tyrant (crowned)" and "crowned chat-tyrant (Kalinowski's)".

== Description ==
The crowned chat-tyrant is 12.5 to 13 cm (4.9 to 5.1 in) long. Adult males of the nominate subspecies have a dark brown crown and a yellow forecrown that continues and becomes white as a supercilium past the eye on an otherwise dark brown face. Their upperparts are dark brown. Their wings and tail are mostly dusky with dusky brown edges on the feathers. Their throat is whitish gray, their breast and upper belly dark gray, their lower belly whitish gray, and their crissum and lower flanks cinnamon to rufous-buff. Adult females have a lighter crown and more cinnamon-buff on their underparts than males. Both sexes have a dark iris, a black bill, and black legs and feet. Juveniles are brighter overall than adults and have a buff tinge on the supercilium, buffy wing bars, and a brownish wash on the flanks and belly. Subspecies S. f. albidiadema has a completely white forecrown and supercilium and is otherwise like the nominate.

== Distribution and habitat ==
The crowned chat-tyrant has a disjunct distribution. The nominate subspecies has the larger range of the two. It is found in the central and western ranges of the Colombian Andes and south along both Andean slopes through Ecuador into Peru on the eastern slope to La Libertad Department. Subspecies S. f. albidiadema is found in Colombia's Eastern Andes from Norte de Santander Department south to Cundinamarca Department. The species inhabits humid montane forest and woodland, elfin forest, and scrubby areas in the temperate zone up to tree line. In elevation it ranges between 2,200 and 3,600 m (7,200 and 11,800 ft) in Colombia, mostly between 2,800 and 4,000 m (9,200 and 13,100 ft) in Ecuador, and mostly between 2,800 and 3,700 m (9,200 and 12,100 ft) but locally as low as 2,300 m (7,500 ft) in Peru.

== Behavior ==
=== Movement ===
The crowned chat-tyrant is a year-round resident.

=== Feeding ===
The crowned chat-tyrant feeds on insects. It usually forages singly but occasionally joins mixed-species feeding flocks. It perches inconspicuously near the ground in the forest undergrowth. It takes prey with sallies from the perch to vegetation, branches, and trunks.

=== Breeding ===
The crowned chat-tyrant's breeding season has not been defined but includes September in Colombia and March in Ecuador. Its nest is an open cup placed in a niche in a cliff or in a shrub or bush. Nothing else is known about the species' breeding biology.

=== Vocalization ===
The crowned chat-tyrant's song is "a drawn-out rather high-pitched but descending trill, ses-rrrrrrrrrrrrrrrrrrrrrrrrrrrrrr" that lasts several seconds.

== Status ==
The IUCN follows HBW taxonomy and so has not separately assessed the crowned and Kalinowski's chat-tyrants. The combined taxa are judged to be of Least Concern. Their population size is not known and is believed to be decreasing. No immediate threats have been identified. It is considered "rather uncommon" in Colombia, "uncommon" in Ecuador, and "fairly common" in Peru. It occurs in nearly all of the protected areas within its range.
