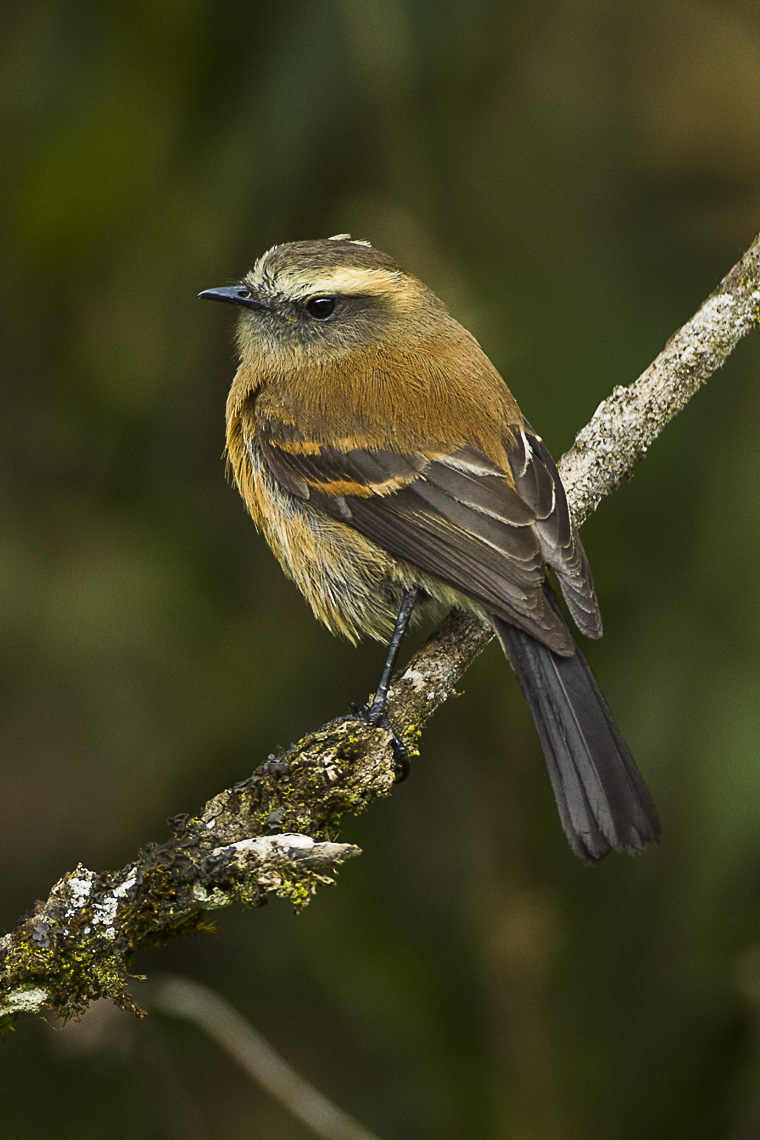
- Brown-backed chat-tyrant (Ochthoeca fumicolor)

Scientific classification
- Kingdom: Animalia
- Phylum: Chordata
- Class: Aves
- Order: Passeriformes
- Family: Tyrannidae
- Genus: Ochthoeca; Cabanis, 1847

Type species
- Fluvicola oenanthoides d'Orbigny & Lafresnaye, 1837

Species
- see text

= Ochthoeca =

Genus of birds

Ochthoeca is a genus of South American birds in the tyrant flycatcher family Tyrannidae.

== Taxonomy ==
The genus Ochthoeca was introduced in 1847 by the German ornithologist Jean Cabanis. His listed two species in the genus but did not specify the type species. In 1855 the English zoologist George Gray designated the type as Fluvicola oenanthoides D'Orbigny & Lafresnaye, D'Orbigny's chat-tyrant. The genus name combines the Ancient Greek οχθος/okhthos meaning "bank" or "mound" with οικος/oikos meaning "dwelling".

== Species ==
The genus contains ten species:

Image	Common name	Scientific name	Distribution
	Tumbes tyrant	Ochthoeca salvini	northwest Peru
	Slaty-backed chat-tyrant	Ochthoeca cinnamomeiventris	Colombia to northern Peru
	Blackish chat-tyrant	Ochthoeca nigrita	Venezuela
	Maroon-belted chat-tyrant	Ochthoeca thoracica	eastern Andes of Peru and Bolivia.
	Rufous-breasted chat-tyrant	Ochthoeca rufipectoralis	northern Andes
	Brown-backed chat-tyrant	Ochthoeca fumicolor	northern Andes
	Rufous-browed chat-tyrant	Ochthoeca superciliosa	Venezuela
	D'Orbigny's chat-tyrant	Ochthoeca oenanthoides	Puna grassland
	White-browed chat-tyrant	Ochthoeca leucophrys	Puna grassland
	Piura chat-tyrant	Ochthoeca piurae	Peru

The genus Ochthoeca formerly included some species that are now placed in the genus Silvicultrix.
