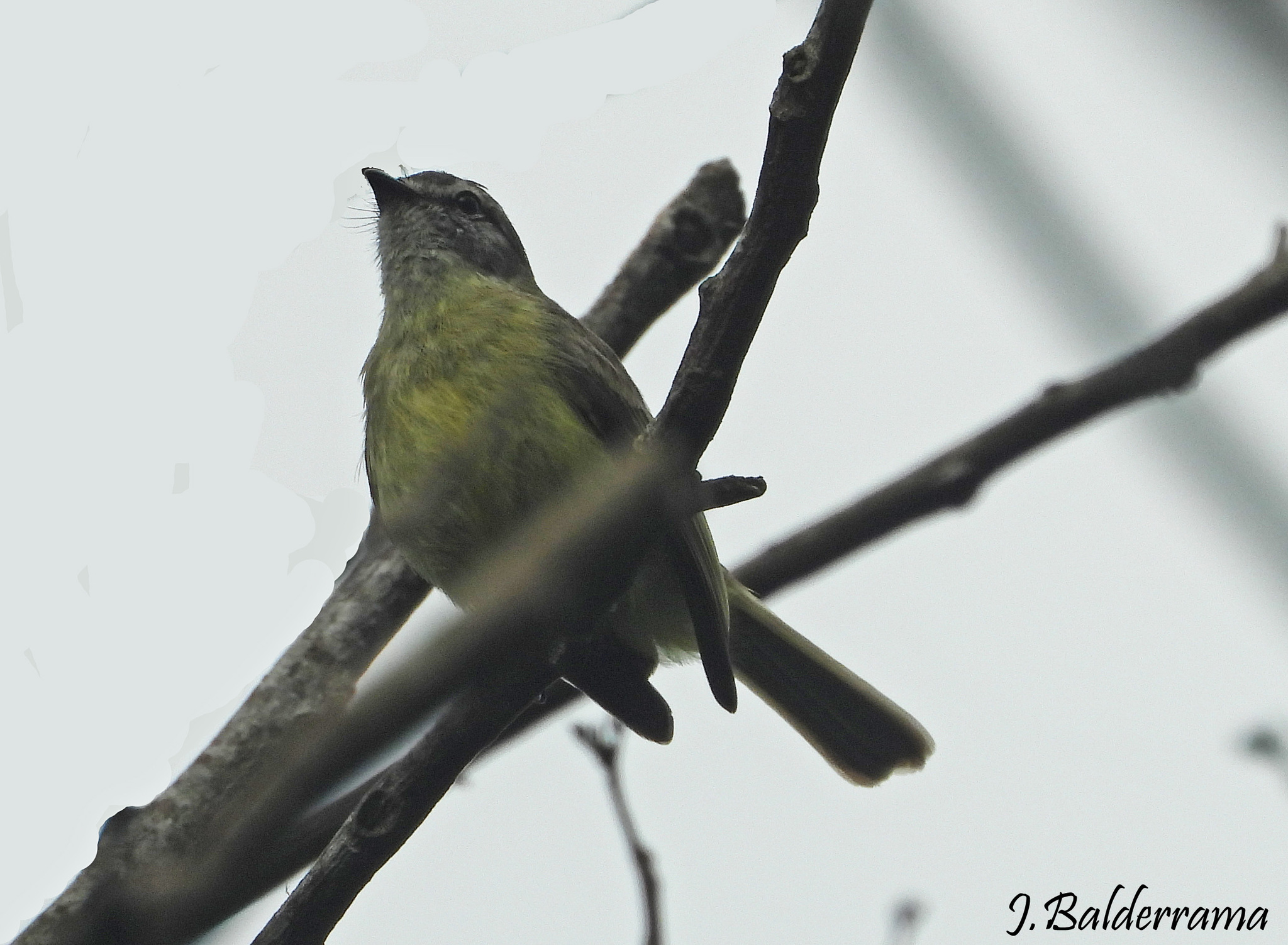

Conservation status
- Near Threatened (IUCN 3.1)

Scientific classification
- Kingdom: Animalia
- Phylum: Chordata
- Class: Aves
- Order: Passeriformes
- Family: Tyrannidae
- Genus: Phyllomyias
- Species: P. weedeni

Binomial name
- Phyllomyias weedeni Herzog, Kessler & Balderrama, 2008

= Yungas tyrannulet =

Species of bird

The Yungas tyrannulet (Phyllomyias weedeni) is a Near Threatened species of bird in subfamily Elaeniinae of family Tyrannidae, the tyrant flycatchers. It is found in Bolivia and Peru.

== Taxonomy and systematics ==
The Yungas tyrannulet was discovered in the early 1990s but not formally described until 2008. It had apparently either been overlooked or mistaken for the similar planalto tyrannulet (P. fasciatus). It is monotypic.

== Description ==
The Yungas tyrannulet is 10 to 11.5 cm (3.9 to 4.5 in) long. The sexes have the same plumage. Adults have a dull olive-gray crown and nape with a slightly mottled appearance. Their lores, supercilium, partial eyering, and lower face are whitish with a dark stripe through their eye. Their upperparts are yellow-olive that becomes paler and more yellowish on their rump and uppertail coverts. Their flight feathers are fuscous to dusky brown with pale yellowish to creamy edges. Their wing coverts are dusky brown with creamy to slightly yellowish to buffy tips and edges that show as two bars on the closed wing. Their tail is dusky brown with yellowish outer edges to the feathers. Their chin and upper throat are whitish with a faint yellow tinge on the latter. Their lower throat, breast, and belly feathers have grayish bases and yellowish tips. The sides of their breast are slightly olivaceous and their undertail coverts yellow. They have a deep brown iris, a black bill with a pinkish base to the mandible, and black legs and feet with yellow soles.

== Distribution and habitat ==
The Yungas tyrannulet is found on the east side of the Andes from extreme southeastern Puno Department in Peru southeast into La Paz, southwestern Beni, and western Cochabamba departments in northwestern Bolivia. It takes its English name from the Yungas bioregion that encompasses its range. It inhabits humid and semi-humid forest in the foothills and lower montane zone where it favors areas with an irregular canopy. It also occurs in shade coffee plantations interspersed with small patches of forest. In elevation it ranges between 700 and 1,200 m (2,300 and 3,900 ft).

== Behavior ==
=== Movement ===
The Yungas tyrannulet is believed to be a year-round resident throughout its range.

=== Feeding ===
The Yungas tyrannulet forages in the forest canopy, usually in pairs, and usually by catching flying insects with short sallies from a perch.

=== Breeding ===
Nothing is known about the Yungas tyrannulet's breeding biology.

=== Vocalization ===
The Yungas tyrannulet's song is "a slightly accelerating series of 3–5 whistled notes successively dropping in pitch, first note longest". Pairs also sing an antiphonal duet with one member singing a short burry note and the other a more complex series of notes.

== Status ==
The IUCN has assessed the Yungas tyrannulet as Near Threatened. It has a limited range and its estimated population of between 2500 and 10,000 mature individuals is believed to be decreasing. "Its habitat is thought to be declining owing to large-scale conversion of forest habitat to subsistence farming." it is considered rare in Peru and in Bolivia is known from fewer than 10 locations, three of which are protected areas. "Further surveys needed in order to determine true population size and trends, and to ascertain whether the species can persist in mosaics of coffee plantations and forest."
