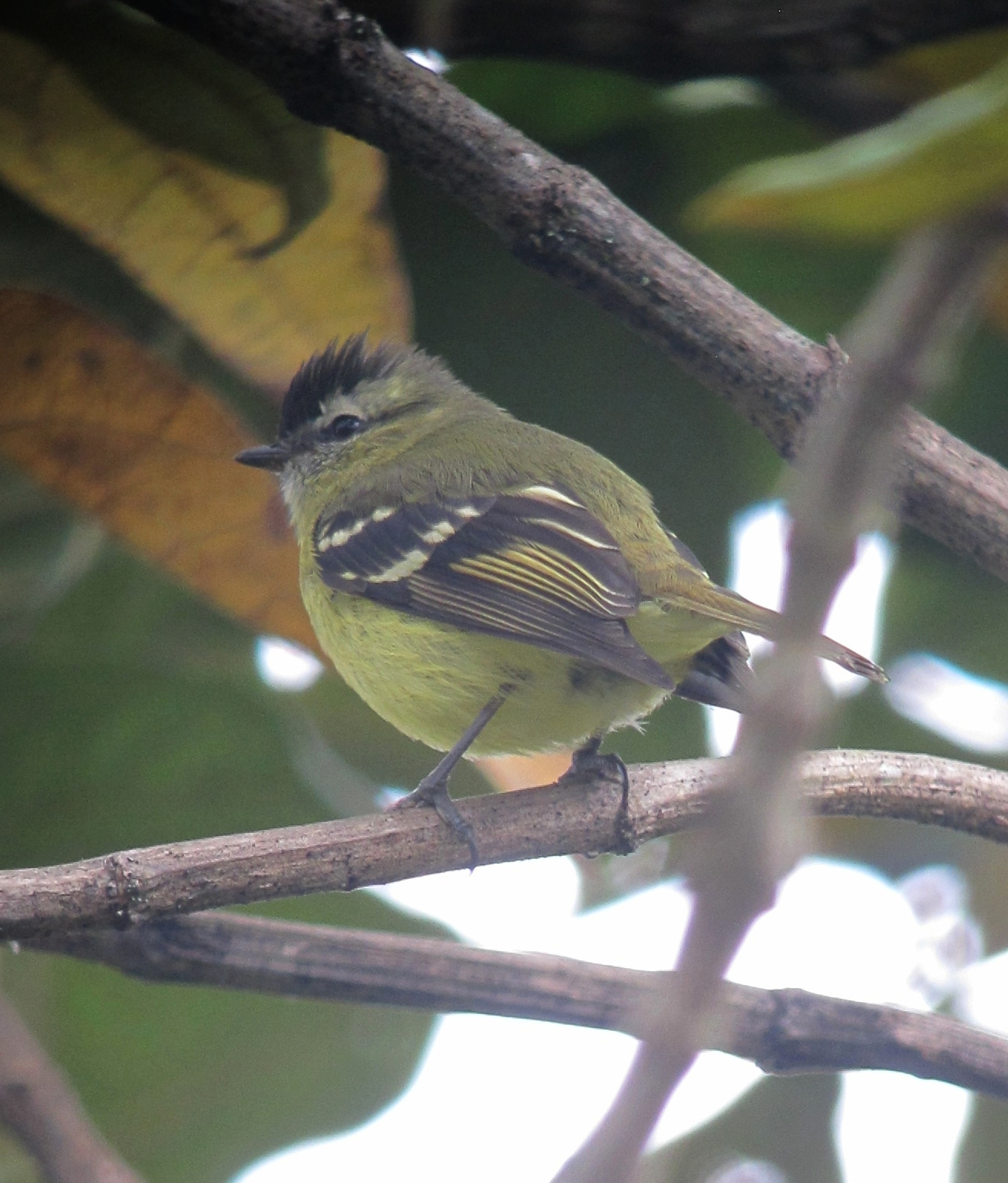
- In Colombia

Conservation status
- Least Concern (IUCN 3.1)

Scientific classification
- Kingdom: Animalia
- Phylum: Chordata
- Class: Aves
- Order: Passeriformes
- Family: Tyrannidae
- Genus: Tyranniscus
- Species: T. nigrocapillus

Binomial name
- Tyranniscus nigrocapillus (Lafresnaye, 1845)

= Black-capped tyrannulet =

Species of bird

The black-capped tyrannulet (Tyranniscus nigrocapillus) is a small passerine bird in the tyrant flycatcher family Tyrannidae. It is found in Colombia, Ecuador, Peru, and Venezuela. Its natural habitat is subtropical or tropical moist montane forests.

== Taxonomy ==
The black-capped tyrannulet was formally described in 1845 by the French ornithologist Frédéric de Lafresnaye under the binomial name Tyrannulus nigrocapillus. He specified the type locality as "Bogotam", now Bogotá in Columbia. The specific epithet combines the Latin niger meaning "black" with -capillus meaning "-capped". The species was formerly placed in the genus Phyllomyias but when a molecular phylogenetic study published in 2020 found that this genus was paraphyletic, the black-capped tyrannulet and two other tyrannulets were moved to the resurrected genus Tyranniscus that has been introduced in 1860 by the German ornithologists Jean Cabanis and Ferdinand Heine.

Three subspecies are recognised:

- T. n. flavimentum (Chapman, 1912) – Santa Marta Mountains (northeast Colombia)
- T. n. nigrocapillus (Lafresnaye, 1845) – west Colombia and Ecuador to central Peru
- T. n. aureus (Zimmer, JT, 1941) – west Venezuela
