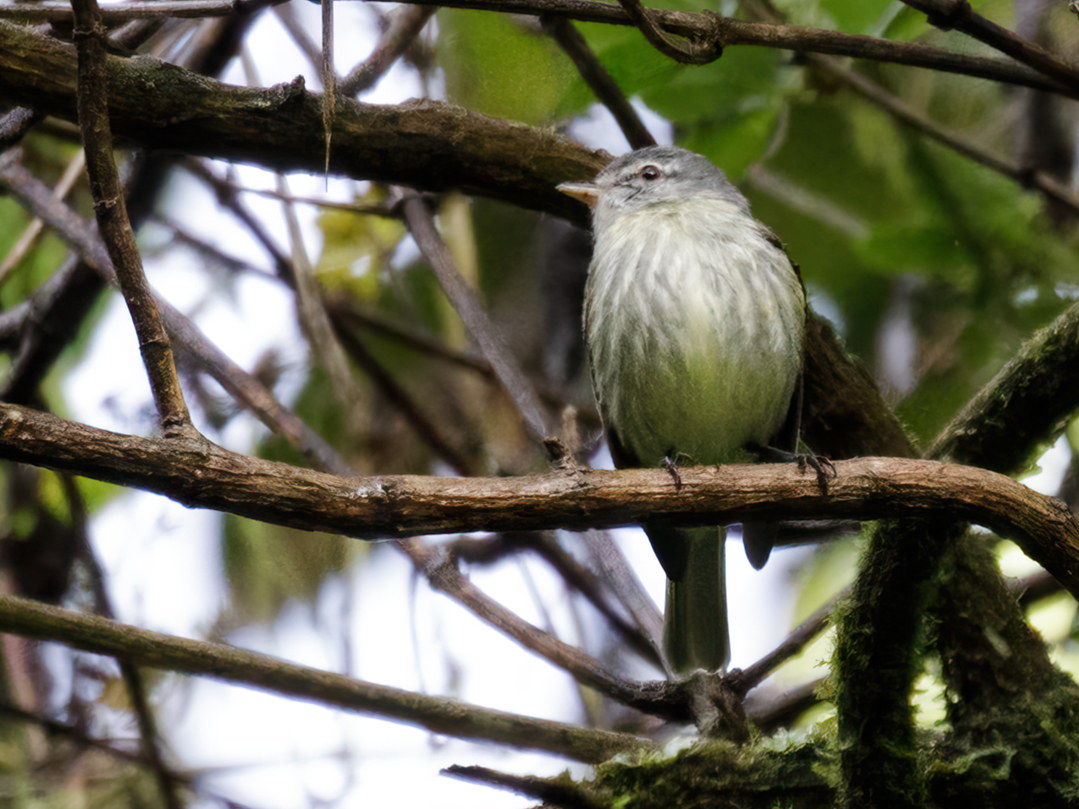

Conservation status
- Least Concern (IUCN 3.1)

Scientific classification
- Kingdom: Animalia
- Phylum: Chordata
- Class: Aves
- Order: Passeriformes
- Family: Tyrannidae
- Genus: Acrochordopus
- Species: A. zeledoni

Binomial name
- Acrochordopus zeledoni (Lawrence, 1869)

Synonyms
- Pogonotriccus zeledoni; Phyllomyias zeledoni

= White-fronted tyrannulet =

Species of bird

The white-fronted tyrannulet (Acrochordopus zeledoni) is a species of bird in subfamily Elaeniinae of family Tyrannidae, the tyrant flycatchers. It is found in Bolivia, Colombia, Costa Rica, Ecuador, Panama, Peru, and Venezuela.

== Taxonomy and systematics ==
The white-fronted tyrannulet has a complicated taxonomic history. It was originally described as Pogonotriccus ?[sic] zeledoni. During much of the twentieth century it was placed in genus Acrochordopus, which in the 1970s was merged into Phyllomyias. At about that time it was lumped into the rough-legged tyrannulet (then Phyllomyias burmeisteri, now Acrochordopus burmeisteri). In September 2023 the South American Classification Committee of the American Ornithological Society resurrected genus Acrochordopus, restored the white-fronted tyrannulet to full species status, and moved it back into Acrochordopus. The North American Classification Committee of the AOS followed suit in July 2024 as did the International Ornithological Committee (IOC) in August 2024 and the Clements taxonomy in October 2024. As of November 2024 BirdLife International retain the species in genus Phyllomyias.

The white-fronted tyrannulet has these five subspecies:

- A. z. zeledoni (Lawrence, 1869) – Costa Rica and west Panama
- A. z. leucogonys (Sclater, PL & Salvin, 1871) – central Colombia, east Ecuador and northeast Peru
- A. z. wetmorei Aveledo & Pons, 1953 – Serranía del Perijá (northeast Colombia and northwest Venezuela)
- A. z. viridiceps Zimmer, JT & Phelps, WH, 1944 – north Venezuela
- A. z. bunites Wetmore & Phelps, WH Jr, 1956 – tepuis of south Venezuela

== Description ==
The white-fronted tyrannulet is about 11 to 12.5 cm (4.3 to 4.9 in) long and weighs about 12.5 g (0.44 oz). The sexes have the same plumage. Adults of the nominate subspecies P. z. zeledoni have a slate colored crown and nape and an olive-green back and rump. Their forehead ("front") is white and the color extends through the lores and over the eye. They have a narrow dusky line through the eye and their face below it is grizzled whitish. Their wings are dusky with two yellow bars. Their tail is olive-green. Their throat is whitish and their underparts yellow-gray that is a purer yellow in the center.

The other subspecies differ from the nominate and each other thus:

- A. z. leucogonys: duller green back and paler yellow underparts than nominate
- A. z. wetmorei: overall darker than nominate
- A. z. viridiceps: slate-gray forehead and olive-green crown
- A. z. bunites: slate-gray of nape extends further towards the back than on nominate

All subspecies have a reddish brown or pale sandy gray iris and black or fuscous legs and feet. The nominate subspecies and A. z. leucogonys have a black or fuscous maxilla and a pale pink mandible. The other subspecies have an all black or fuscous bill.

== Distribution and habitat ==
The white-fronted tyrannulet has a highly disjunct distribution. No subspecies' range abuts another and even within each range the distribution is not continuous. The subspecies are found thus:

- A. z. zeledoni: from the Cordillera de Tilarán in northern Costa Rica south into western Panama's Chiriquí Province
- A. z. leucogonys: eastern Andean slope in Colombia's Eastern Andes, eastern Ecuador, and Peru as far south as northwestern Puno Department
- A. z. wetmorei: Sierra Nevada de Santa Marta in northeastern Colombia and Serranía del Perijá on the Colombia-Venezuela border
- A. z. viridiceps: Venezuelan Coastal Range between Carabobo and Miranda states
- A. z. bunites: Chimantá-tepui in southeastern Venezuela's Bolívar state

The white-fronted tyrannulet primarily inhabits the canopy of humid evergreen forest in the subtropical and tropical zones. It also inhabits the forest edges, clearings with scattered trees, and mature secondary forest. In elevation it occurs between 800 and 2,800 m (2,600 and 9,200 ft) in Costa Rica, 900 and 1,850 m (3,000 and 6,100 ft) in Panama, 500 and 1,000 m (1,600 and 3,300 ft) in Colombia, 600 and 1,500 m (2,000 and 4,900 ft) in Ecuador, 750 and 1,600 m (2,500 and 5,200 ft) in Peru, and 475 and 1,800 m (1,600 and 5,900 ft) in Venezuela.

== Behavior ==
=== Movement ===
The white-fronted tyrannulet is a year-round resident throughout its range.

=== Feeding ===
The white-fronted tyrannulet's diet has not been studied but is known to include arthropods and small berries. It usually forages singly and often joins mixed-species feeding flocks. It forages mostly in the forest's mid- and upper levels and sometimes lower, taking prey and fruits by gleaning while perched and while briefly hovering.

=== Breeding ===
The white-fronted tyrannulet's breeding season has not been defined but is known to include August in Panama. One nest was a cup made of moss on a horizontal branch 12 m (40 ft) up in the canopy of a tree. Both members of the pair built it. Nothing else is known about the species' breeding biology.

=== Vocalization ===
What is thought to be the white-fronted tyrannulet's song is "a high-pitched and piercing 'tzeeee' or 'sweeeu' either given as a protracted series of single notes [or] sometimes in a descending series of up to 5–7 notes". It typically vocalizes the most in the morning.

== Status ==
The IUCN has assessed the white-fronted tyrannulet as being of Least Concern. It has a large range; its population size is not known and is believed to be decreasing. No immediate threats have been identified. It is considered rare in Costa Rica, "local and enigmatic" in Colombia, "rare and local (overlooked?)" in Ecuador, "poorly known" in Peru, and "very uncommon and local" in Venezuela.
