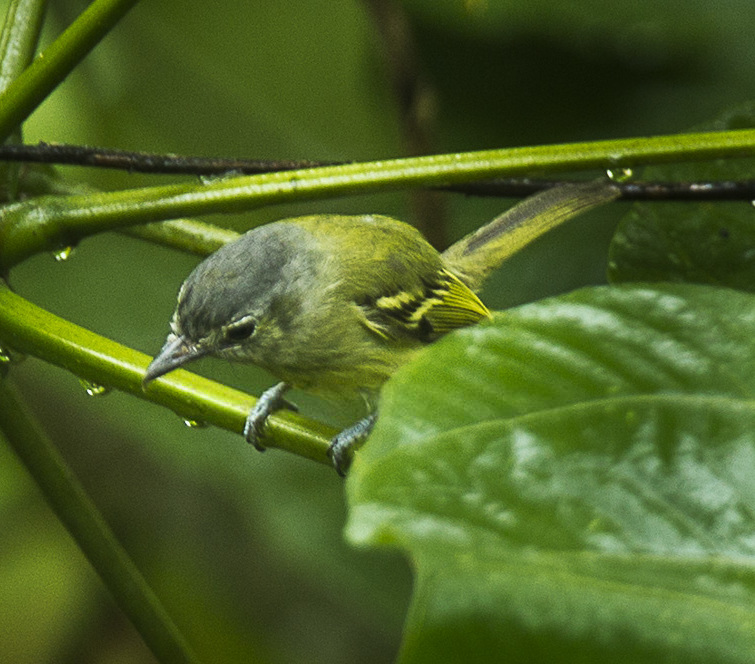

Conservation status
- Least Concern (IUCN 3.1)

Scientific classification
- Kingdom: Animalia
- Phylum: Chordata
- Class: Aves
- Order: Passeriformes
- Family: Tyrannidae
- Genus: Tyranniscus
- Species: T. cinereiceps

Binomial name
- Tyranniscus cinereiceps (Sclater, PL, 1860)

Synonyms
- Tyrannulus cinereiceps; Phyllomyias cinereiceps

= Ashy-headed tyrannulet =

Species of bird

The ashy-headed tyrannulet (Tyranniscus cinereiceps) is a species of bird in subfamily Elaeniinae of family Tyrannidae, the tyrant flycatchers. It is found in Colombia, Ecuador, Peru, and Venezuela.

== Taxonomy and systematics ==
The ashy-headed tyrannulet was originally described as Tyrannulus cinereiceps. During much of the twentieth century it was placed in genus Tyranniscus and in the 1970s was transferred to genus Phyllomyias. A study published in 2020 showed that Phyllomyias was polyphyletic and that the ashy-headed and several other tyrannulets did not belong in it. In September 2023 the South American Classification Committee of the American Ornithological Society (SACC) resurrected genus Tyranniscus and moved the ashy-headed tyrannulet back into it. The International Ornithological Committee (IOC) followed suit in August 2024. As of September 2024 the Clements taxonomy and BirdLife International's Handbook of the Birds of the World (HBW) retain the species in genus Phyllomyias.

The ashy-headed tyrannulet is monotypic.

== Description ==
The ashy-headed tyrannulet is about 10 to 11 cm (3.9 to 4.3 in) long and weighs about 10 g (0.35 oz). The sexes have the same plumage. Adults have a slaty blue-gray crown. Their nape, back, and rump are bright olive. They have white lores and eyering. They have a thin dark line through the eye and a yellowish cheek with a black crescent behind it and yellow behind the crescent. Their wings are dusky with two yellow bars and edges of the inner flight feathers. Their tail is dusky olive. Their throat is grayish white, their breast and flanks yellow with olive streaks, and their belly bright yellow. They have a dark red iris, a small and rounded black bill, and black legs and feet.

== Distribution and habitat ==
The ashy-headed tyrannulet has a disjunct distribution, and is found intermittently within each of its ranges. It is found in the Andes from southwestern Táchira in extreme western Venezuela into northern Colombia, in all three Andean ranges in Colombia, through Ecuador on both slopes, and into Peru on the eastern slope as far as Puno Department. It inhabits the interior and edges of humid montane forest in the subtropical zone, especially cloudforest and to a lesser degree secondary forest. In elevation it occurs between 1,700 and 1,900 m (5,600 and 6,200 ft) in Venezuela, 1,800 and 2,800 m (5,900 and 9,200 ft) in Colombia, mostly between 1,350 and 2,500 m (4,400 and 8,200 ft) in Ecuador, and 1,300 and 2,450 m (4,300 and 8,000 ft) in Peru.

== Behavior ==
=== Movement ===
The ashy-headed tyrannulet is believed to be a year-round resident throughout its range.

=== Feeding ===
The ashy-headed tyrannulet feeds on insects and probably also small fruits. It forages singly and in pairs, usually as part of a mixed-species feeding flock. It forages mostly in the forest's mid- and upper levels, taking prey by gleaning while perched and with brief sallies.

=== Breeding ===
Nothing is known about the ashy-headed tyrannulet's breeding biology beyond that fledglings have been noted in October and November in Colombia.

=== Vocalization ===
The ashy-headed tyrannulet's song is a "[p]iercing and far-carrying, a high-pitched note followed by descending trill, 'sweeeee, see-ee-ee-ee-eew' ". Its call is "a gruff pit-tuck".

== Status ==
The IUCN has assessed the ashy-headed tyrannulet as being of Least Concern. It has a large range; its population size is not known and is believed to be stable. No immediate threats have been identified. It is extremely rare in Venezuela, known from only three records, all before 2000. It is considered "uncommon but widespread" in Colombia and "rare to uncommon" in Peru. It occurs in all of the national parks within its Ecudadoran and Peruvian ranges.
