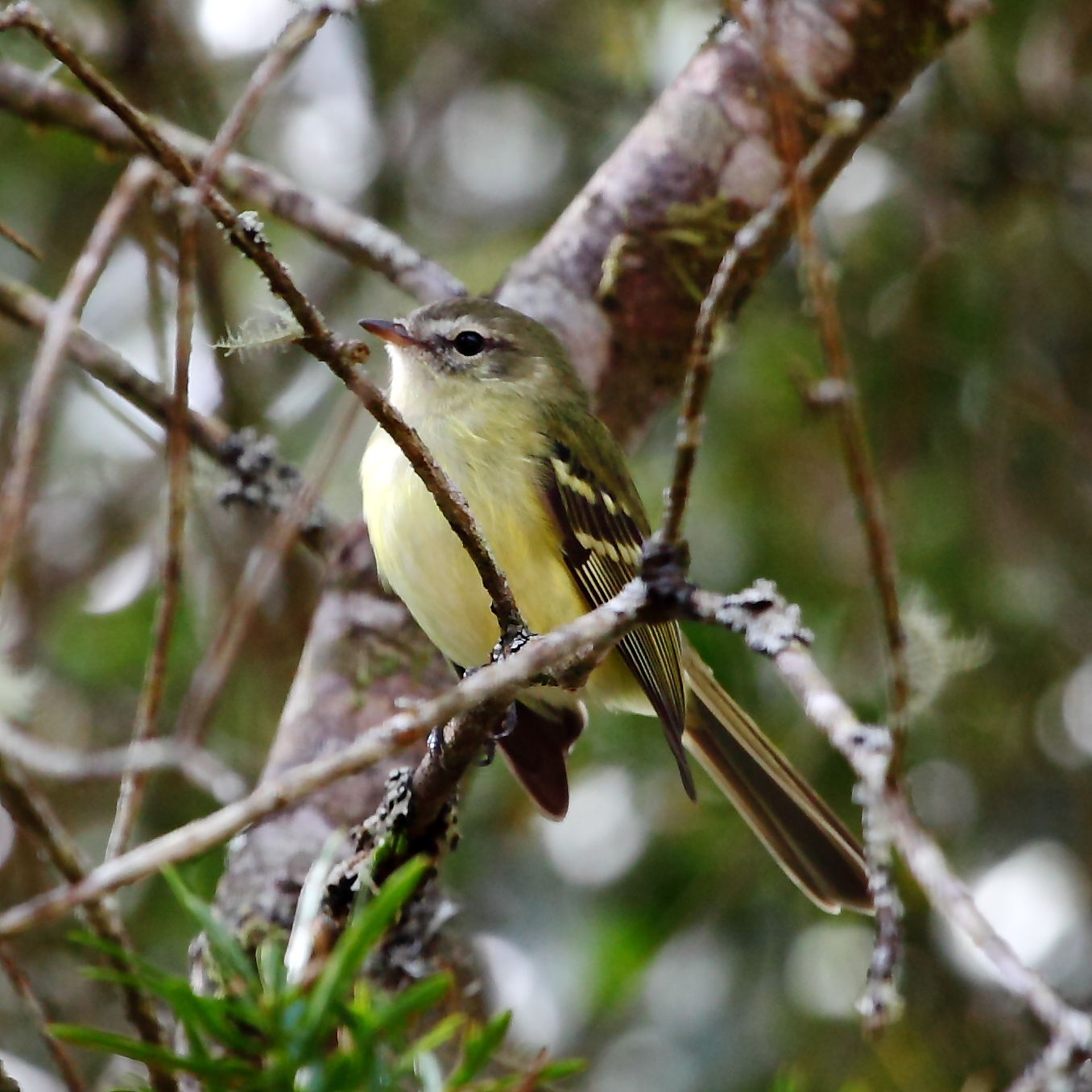
- At Campos do Jordão, São Paulo State, Brazil.

Conservation status
- Least Concern (IUCN 3.1)

Scientific classification
- Kingdom: Animalia
- Phylum: Chordata
- Class: Aves
- Order: Passeriformes
- Family: Tyrannidae
- Genus: Phyllomyias
- Species: P. virescens

Binomial name
- Phyllomyias virescens (Temminck, 1824)

Synonyms
- Xanthomyias virescens

= Greenish tyrannulet =

Species of bird

The greenish tyrannulet (Phyllomyias virescens) is a species of bird in subfamily Elaeniinae of family Tyrannidae, the tyrant flycatchers. It is found in Argentina, Brazil, Paraguay, and Uruguay.

== Taxonomy and systematics ==
In the early to mid twentieth century some authors placed the greenish tyrannulet in genus Xanthomyias; that genus was merged into Phyllomyias in the 1970s. Some of the same authors, and others, treated the greenish tyrannulet and Reiser's tyrannulet (P. reiseri) as conspecific. They were separated around the turn of the twentieth century. The two of them and Urich's tyrannulet (P. uruchi) form a superspecies.

The greenish tyrannulet is monotypic.

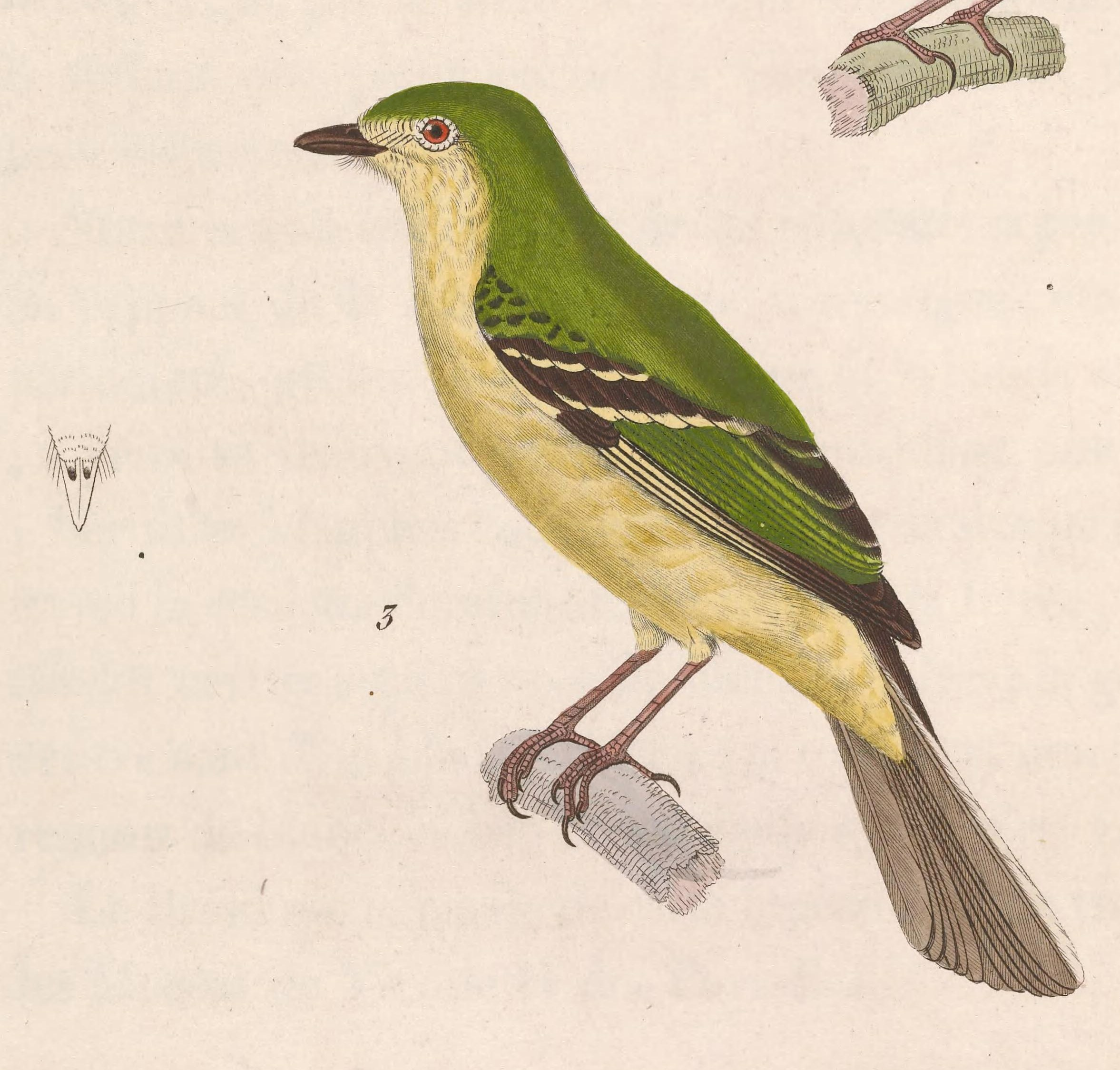
Phyllomyias virescens; illustration 1838.

== Description ==
The greenish tyrannulet is 12 to 13.5 cm (4.7 to 5.3 in) long and weighs 10 to 12 g (0.35 to 0.42 oz). The sexes have the same plumage. Adults have a bright olive crown, nape, back, and rump. They have white lores and supercilium, an olive line through the eye, and whitish ear coverts with faint darker speckles. Their wings are dusky with pale yellowish edges on the flight feathers and the ends of the coverts; the last show as two bars on the closed wing. Their tail is dusky. Their throat is whitish and their underparts yellow with faint olive streaks on the breast and sides. Their iris is brown, their short stubby bill brown to blackish with a brownish white base to the mandible, and their legs and feet medium to dark gray.

== Distribution and habitat ==
The greenish tyrannulet is found in southern Brazil in an area roughly bounded by southern Mato Grosso do Sul, Espírito Santo, and central Rio Grande do Sul, in southeastern Paraguay, and in Misiones and northern Corrientes provinces in northeastern Argentina. It has also been recorded as a vagrant in Uruguay. It inhabits the interior and edges of humid evergreen forest and secondary forest in the tropical and subtropical zones. In elevation it reaches 1,000 m (3,300 ft).

== Behavior ==
=== Movement ===
The greenish tyrannulet is believed to be a year-round resident throughout its range.

=== Feeding ===
The greenish tyrannulet's diet and foraging behavior have not been studied. It is known to forage at most levels of the forest, sometimes as low as 2 m (7 ft) above the ground.

=== Breeding ===
The greenish tyrannulet's breeding season has not been fully defined but includes October and November. Its nest is purse-like with a side entrance, made of moss, and suspended from a branch low to the ground. The clutch is two eggs. The incubation period, time to fledging, and details of parental care are not known.

=== Vocalization ===
The greenish tyrannulet's song is a "high, sharp, very short, nervous, twittering almost-trill (level, slightly rising or lowering, then rising)". It has been written as "chk-chk-chk-chk-chk-cheee-eeee-eeee-eeee-chu-choo". Another vocalization is a "low, chattered, fast 'piurrr' ".

== Status ==
The IUCN has assessed the greenish tyrannulet as being of Least Concern. It has a large range; its population size is not known and is believed to be decreasing. No immediate threats have been identified. It is considered uncommon in most of its range; it does occur in protected areas in all three countries it inhabits. It is "[a]pparently not entirely dependent on undisturbed forest; found also in secondary vegetation and edge habitat".
