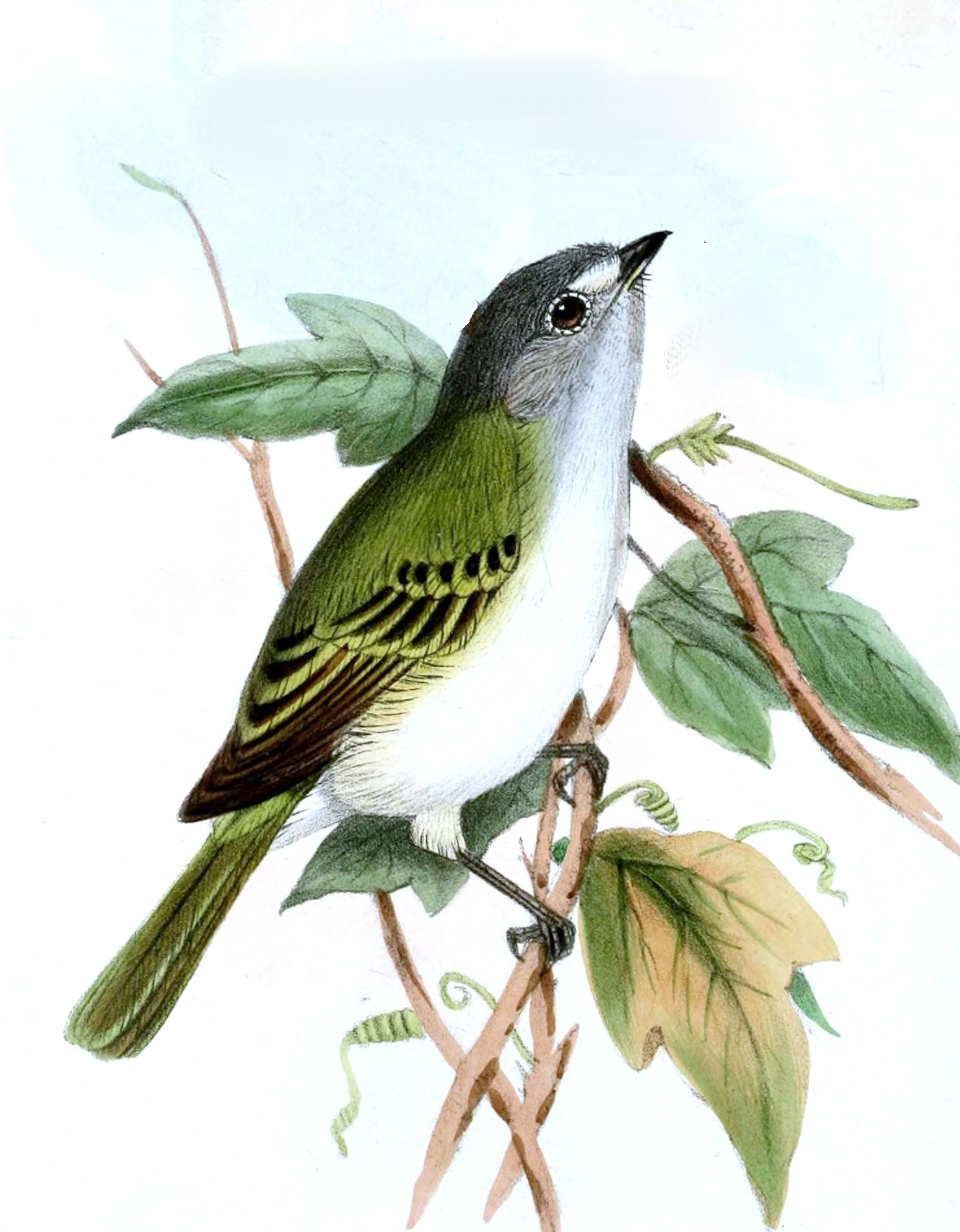

Conservation status
- Least Concern (IUCN 3.1)

Scientific classification
- Kingdom: Animalia
- Phylum: Chordata
- Class: Aves
- Order: Passeriformes
- Family: Tyrannidae
- Genus: Phyllomyias
- Species: P. griseocapilla

Binomial name
- Phyllomyias griseocapilla Sclater, PL, 1862

Synonyms
- Oreotriccus griseocapilla

= Grey-capped tyrannulet =

Species of bird

The grey-capped tyrannulet (Phyllomyias griseocapilla) is a Least Concern species of bird in subfamily Elaeniinae of family Tyrannidae, the tyrant flycatchers. It is endemic to Brazil.

== Taxonomy and systematics ==
The grey-capped tyrannulet was originally described as Phyllomyias griseocapilla. It was moved to genus Oreotriccus in the early twentieth century, and Oreotriccus was then merged into Phyllomyias following a 1977 publication.

The grey-capped tyrannulet is monotypic.

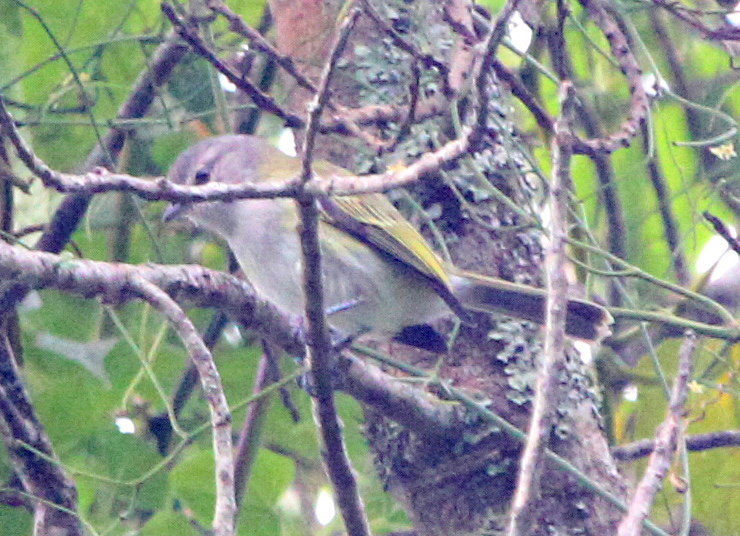
Grey-capped tyrannulet

== Description ==
The grey-capped tyrannulet is about 11 cm (4.3 in) long. The sexes have the same plumage. Adults have a slate-gray crown and nape and bright olive-green back and rump. Their lores and eye area are white with a faint dusky stripe through their eye. Their lower face is pale gray. Their wings are dusky with bright yellow edges on the flight feathers and the ends of the coverts; the latter show as two wing bars. Their tail is dusky olive. Their throat is grayish white, their breast pale gray, their flanks bright yellow-green, and their belly whitish. They have a brown iris, a small and rounded blackish bill, and gray legs and feet.

== Distribution and habitat ==
The grey-capped tyrannulet is found in eastern Brazil in south-central Bahia and further south from Minas Gerais and Espírito Santo to northeastern Rio Grande do Sul. It inhabits the interior and edges of humid primary forest and secondary forest in the tropical zone. In elevation it mostly occurs between 750 and 1,850 m (2,500 and 6,100 ft) but locally is found down to sea level.

== Behavior ==
=== Movement ===
The grey-capped tyrannulet is believed to be a year-round resident throughout its range.

=== Feeding ===
The grey-capped tyrannulet feeds on insects, small fruit, and berries; among the last mistletoe (Loranthaceae) is favored. It forages singly and in pairs and occasionally joins mixed-species feeding flocks. It forages mostly in the forest's mid-level, taking prey and fruits by gleaning while perched and while briefly hovering.

=== Breeding ===
The grey-capped tyrannulet's breeding season has not been fully defined but spans at least from October to January. One nest was a closed globe with a side entrance made mostly from Spanish moss (Tillandsia usneoides). It was built in a tree fork 6 m (20 ft) above the ground and contained two nestlings that both adults were feeding.

=== Vocalization ===
The grey-capped tyrannulet's song is a "short series of 1-4 high, clear, whistled 'weew--' notes". Its call is a "high, clear, drawn-out, rising 'weeeew' ".

== Status ==
The IUCN has assessed the grey-capped tyrannulet as Least Concern. Its population size is not known and is believed to be decreasing. "Agricultural conversion and deforestation for mining and plantation production historically threatened its lowland forests. Current key threats are urbanisation, industrialisation, agricultural expansion, colonisation and associated road-building. it is considered "[u]ncommon to relatively common, but patchily distributed". It occurs in several nominally protected areas, some of whose forests are still being cleared for agriculture and other uses.
