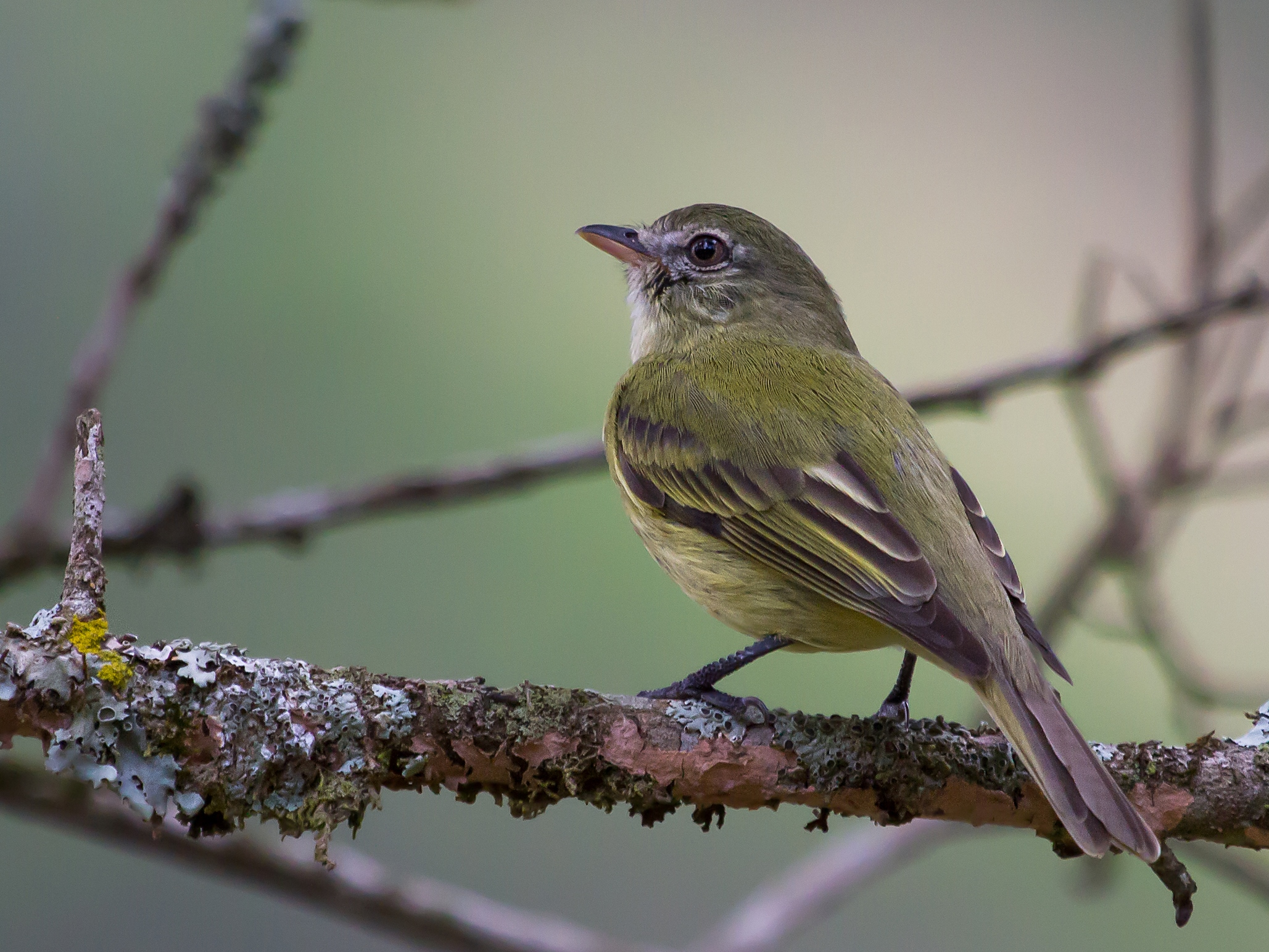
- Rough-legged tyrannulet (Acrochordopus burmeisteri)

Scientific classification
- Kingdom: Animalia
- Phylum: Chordata
- Class: Aves
- Order: Passeriformes
- Family: Tyrannidae
- Genus: Acrochordopus; Berlepsch & Hellmayr, 1905

Type species
- Phyllomyias burnmeisteri Rough-legged tyrannulet Cabanis and Heine, 1860

= Acrochordopus =

Genus of birds

Acrochordopus is a genus of small passerine birds in the tyrant flycatcher family Tyrannidae. The genus contains two species.

== Taxonomy ==
The genus Acrochordopus was introduced in 1905 by the ornithologists Hans von Berlepsch and Carl Eduard Hellmayr. They designated the type species as Phyllomyias subviridis Pelzeln which is a junior synonym of Phyllomyias burnmeisteri Cabanis and Heine, the rough-legged tyrannulet. The genus name combines Ancient Greek ακροχορδων/akrokhordōn, ακροχορδονος/akrokhordonos meaning "wart" with πους/pous, ποδος/podos meaning "foot".

The genus contains two species:

- Rough-legged tyrannulet, Acrochordopus burmeisteri
- White-fronted tyrannulet, Acrochordopus zeledoni

The two species are very similar in appearance and were formerly considered as conspecific. They were split based on differences in vocalization and genetics. These species were formerly placed in the genus Phyllomyias. A large molecular phylogenetic study by Michael Harvey and collaborators published in 2020 found that the genus Phyllomyias was paraphyletic. As part of the reorganization to create monotypic genera, the genus Acrochordopus was resurrected to contain the above two species.
