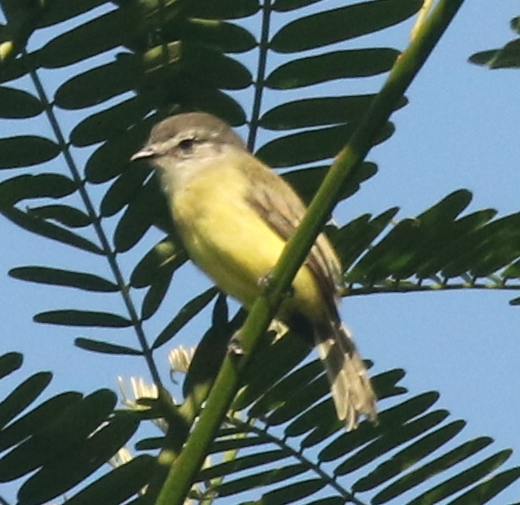

Conservation status
- Least Concern (IUCN 3.1)

Scientific classification
- Kingdom: Animalia
- Phylum: Chordata
- Class: Aves
- Order: Passeriformes
- Family: Tyrannidae
- Genus: Phyllomyias
- Species: P. griseiceps

Binomial name
- Phyllomyias griseiceps (Sclater, PL & Salvin, 1871)

= Sooty-headed tyrannulet =

Species of bird

The sooty-headed tyrannulet (Phyllomyias griseiceps) is a species of bird in subfamily Elaeniinae of family Tyrannidae, the tyrant flycatchers. It is found in Brazil, Colombia, Ecuador, French Guiana, Guyana, Panama, Peru, Suriname, and Venezuela.

== Taxonomy and systematics ==
The International Ornithological Committee and BirdLife International's Handbook of the Birds of the World treat the sooty-headed tyrannulet as monotypic. However, since 2019 the Clements taxonomy has assigned it four subspecies based on a study published in 2014.

This article follows the monotypic species model.

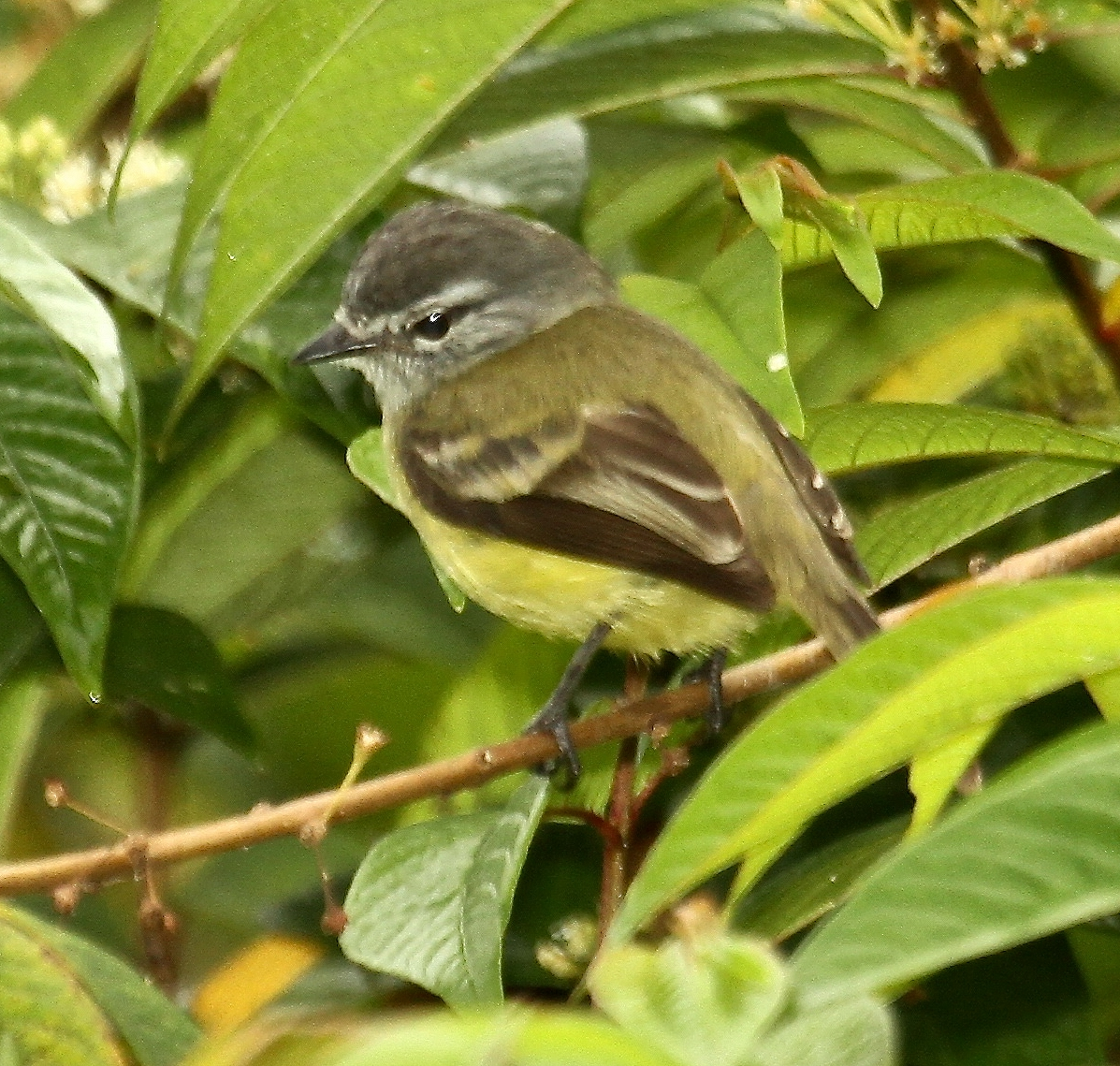
Sooty-headed tyrannulet, Copa Linga Lodge, Ecuador

== Description ==
The sooty-headed tyrannulet is about 10 cm (3.9 in) long and weighs about 8 g (0.28 oz). The sexes have the same plumage. Adults have a grayish to blackish crown and dull grayish olive nape, back, and rump. Their lores and supercilium are white with a dark stripe through their eye. Their lower face is grizzled. Their wings are dusky with narrow whitish edges to the inner flight feathers and the ends of the coverts. Their tail is dusky. Their throat is grayish white, their breast and flanks pale olive, and their belly bright yellow. They have a dark brown iris, a very small and rounded black bill, and black legs and feet.

== Distribution and habitat ==
The sooty-headed tyrannulet has a highly disjunct distribution. The separate populations are found thus:

- Extreme eastern Panama and slightly into northwestern Colombia
- In the Sierra Nevada de Santa Marta in northern Colombia
- In the Serranía del Perijá on the Colombia-Venezuela border
- From extreme southwestern Colombia south through western Ecuador to Loja Province
- From southern Napo Province in Ecuador south to central Peru
- The valleys of the Cauca and Magdalena rivers in Colombia and into western and northern Venezuela
- From eastern Venezuela east across Guyana and Suriname into French Guiana
- Locally in southeastern Venezuela and northern Amazonian Brazil

The sooty-headed tyrannulet primarily inhabits humid evergreen forest in the tropical zone. It shuns the forest interior and favors forest edges, clearings with scattered trees, and regrowing partially cleared areas. It also occurs in other relatively open landscapes like early succession secondary forest, forest on dry sandy soil, and coffe and cacao plantations. In elevation it reaches 1,800 m (5,900 ft) in Colombia, 1,100 m (3,600 ft) in Ecuador, 1,200 m (3,900 ft) in Peru, 1,300 m (4,300 ft) in Venezuela, and to about 500 m (1,600 ft) in the Guianas and Brazil.

== Behavior ==
=== Movement ===
The sooty-headed tyrannulet is a year-round resident throughout its range.

=== Feeding ===
The sooty-headed tyrannulet feeds primarily on insects and on lesser amounts of small fruits and berries. It usually forages alone or in somewhat separated pairs unless in a fruiting tree and occasionally joins mixed-species feeding flocks. It forages from the forest's mid-level to the canopy, taking prey and fruits by gleaning while perched and while briefly hovering.

=== Breeding ===
One sooty-headed tyrannulet nest is known. It was a small lichen-covered cup in the crotch of a small branch 13 m (43 ft) above the ground. Nothing else is known about the species' breeding biology.

=== Vocalization ===
The sooty-headed tyrannulet often sings from an open perch. Its song varies geographically, but in general is "an emphatic phrase of clear, short whistled notes, first one stressed, 'whip, whip-di-irip' or 'whit, whit-wheeu' ".

== Status ==
The IUCN has assessed the sooty-headed tyrannulet as being of Least Concern. It has a large range; its population size is not known and is believed to be stable. No immediate threats have been identified. It is considered local in Panama, fairly common in Colombia, more numerous in western Ecuador than eastern, "poorly known" in Peru, "locally common" in Venezuela, and local in Brazil. It occurs in several protected areas. "Because of its relatively large range and tolerance of converted habitat, this species is not considered to be at any risk."
