= Urich's tyrannulet =

Conservation status
- Endangered (IUCN 3.1)

Scientific classification
- Kingdom: Animalia
- Phylum: Chordata
- Class: Aves
- Order: Passeriformes
- Family: Tyrannidae
- Genus: Phyllomyias
- Species: P. urichi

Binomial name
- Phyllomyias urichi (Chapman, 1899)

Synonyms
- Xanthomyias urichi

Species of bird

Urich's tyrannulet (Phyllomyias urichi) is an Endangered species of bird in subfamily Elaeniinae of family Tyrannidae, the tyrant flycatchers. It is endemic to Venezuela.

== Taxonomy and systematics ==
In the early to mid twentieth century some authors placed Urich's tyrannulet in genus Xanthomyias; that genus was merged into Phyllomyias in the 1970s. For a time it was considered a subspecies of the greenish tyrannulet (P. virescens); they were separated around the turn of the twentieth century. The two of them and Reiser's tyrannulet (P. reiseri) form a superspecies.

Urich's tyrannulet is monotypic.

== History ==
Urich's tyrannulet was described in 1889 from a specimen collected the year before. It was next reported in the 1940s and a third time in 2005. In May 2021, an expedition sponsored by the American Bird Conservancy with support from the Cornell Lab of Ornithology was undertaken in order to determine if it still existed or was extinct. However, the site where the species was sighted in 2005 had been deforested by that point, and several other potential habitats had also been degraded. However, a thickly forested mountainside near Yucucual, Monagas, Venezuela was identified in a photo on Instagram as a potential habitat for the species. The expedition to this area was successful in spotting two different pairs of P. urichi, marking the first observation of the species in 16 years and the first clear photos and sound recordings ever taken of the species.

== Description ==
Urich's tyrannulet is 11.5 to 12 cm (4.5 to 4.7 in) long and weighs 7 to 8 g (0.25 to 0.28 oz). The sexes have the same plumage. Adults have a bright olive crown, nape, back, and rump with faint dusky to grayish tips on the crown feathers. They have white lores and supercilium. Their wings are dusky with pale yellowish white edges on the flight feathers and the ends of the coverts; the last show as two bars on the closed wing. Their tail is dusky olive. Their throat and lower face are whitish and their underparts pale yellow with faint olive streaks on the breast and sides. Their iris is brown, their small rounded bill has a blackish maxilla and a paler mandible, and their legs and feet are gray. Ornithologist David Ascanio, who led the team that rediscovered the species, has described it as resembling a "little tiny Shrek".

== Distribution and habitat ==
Urich's tyrannulet is positively known only from the eastern Venezuelan Coastal Range in northeastern Anzoátegui, Sucre, and northern Monagas states. There has been one unconfirmed sight record further east on the Paria Peninsula. It inhabits humid montane forest in the upper tropical zone. Most records are between elevations of 900 and 1,100 m (3,000 and 3,600 ft) though there is at least one from 800 m (2,600 ft).

== Behavior ==
=== Movement ===
Urich's tyrannulet is believed to be a year-round resident throughout its range.

=== Feeding ===
The diet and foraging behavior of Urich's tyrannulet have not been studied. It has been observed foraging about 7 or 8 m (23 or 26 ft) up in a tree, gleaning insects while moving among the branches.

=== Breeding ===
Nothing is known about the breeding biology of Urich's tyrannulet.

=== Vocalization ===
As of late 2024 xeno-canto had no recordings of Urich's tyrannulet vocalizations. The recordings made by the 2021 expedition members are deposited in the Cornell Lab of Ornithology's Macaulay Library.

== Status ==
The IUCN has assessed Urich's tyrannulet as Endangered. It has a very small range and as of 2025, its estimated population of between 250 and 2,500 mature individuals is believed to be decreasing. A very high percentage of the forest within its range has been cleared for crops (coffee, mango, banana, and citrus) and pasture. Even protection in Cueva del Guácharo National Park is only nominal as parts of it have been cleared and burned for coffee plantations.
