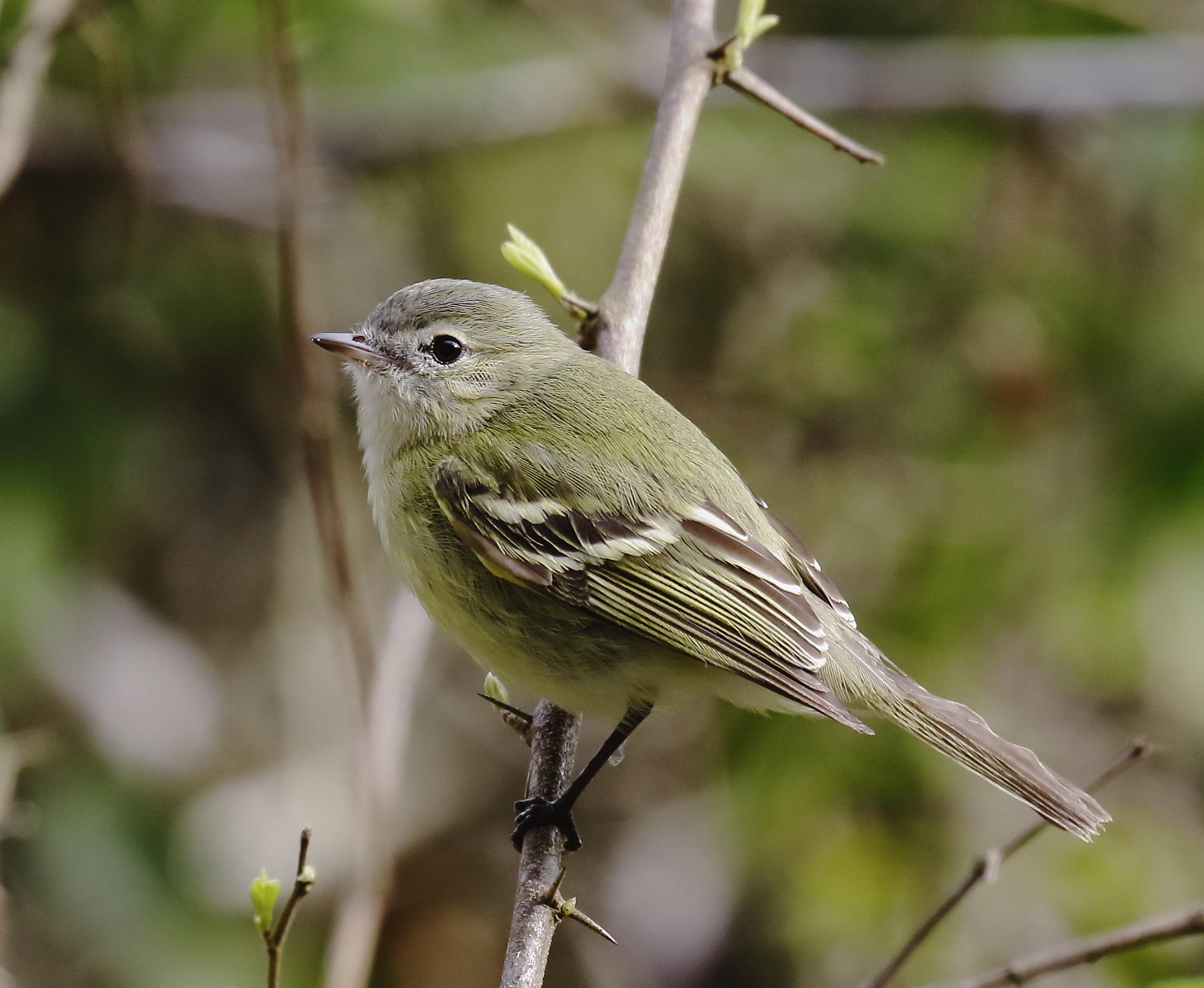

Conservation status
- Least Concern (IUCN 3.1)

Scientific classification
- Kingdom: Animalia
- Phylum: Chordata
- Class: Aves
- Order: Passeriformes
- Family: Tyrannidae
- Genus: Phyllomyias
- Species: P. reiseri

Binomial name
- Phyllomyias reiseri Hellmayr, 1905

Synonyms
- Xanthomyias reiseri

= Reiser's tyrannulet =

Species of bird

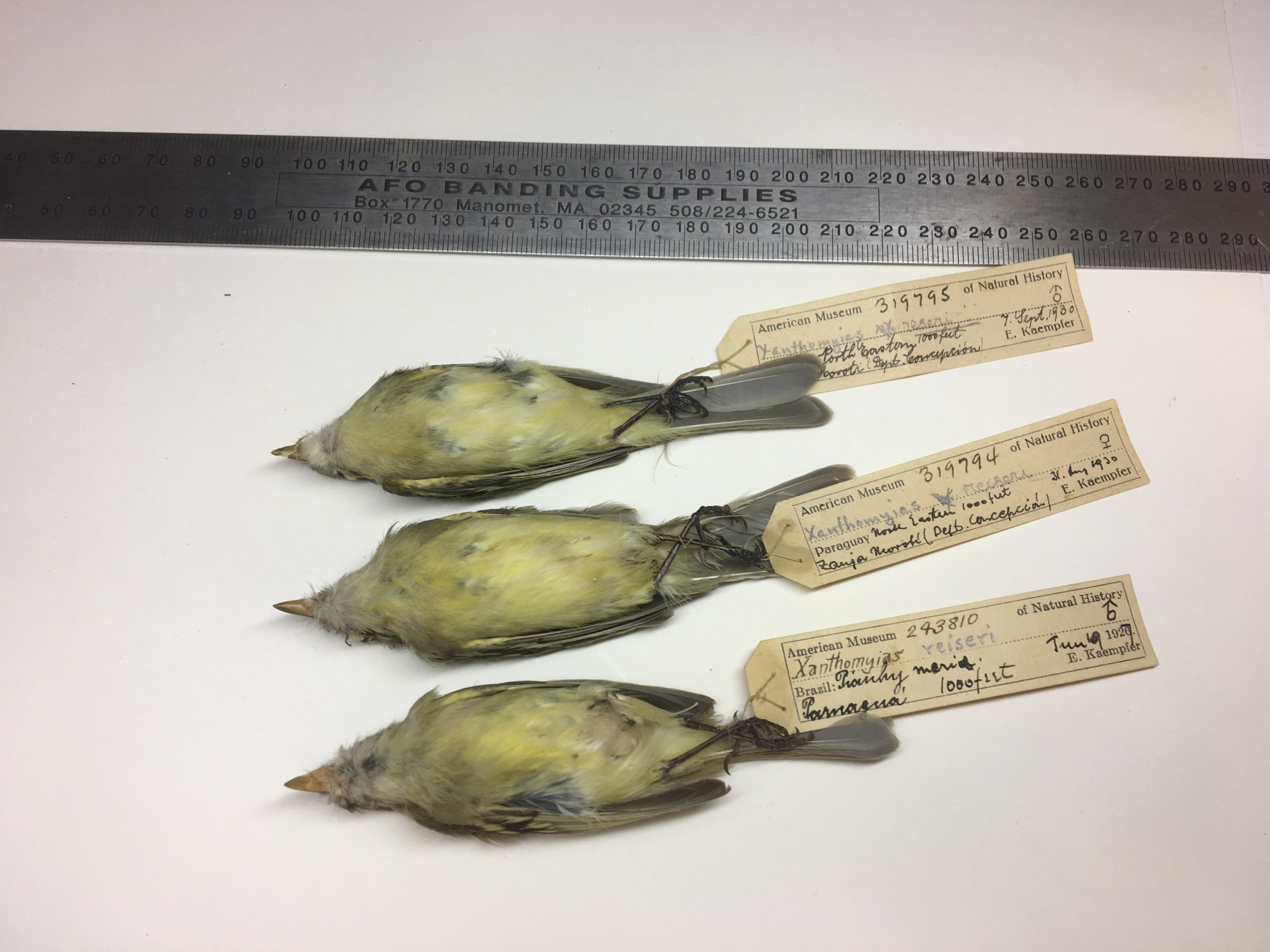
Reiser's tyrannulet specimens in AMNH collection

Reiser's tyrannulet (Phyllomyias reiseri) is a species of bird in subfamily Elaeniinae of family Tyrannidae, the tyrant flycatchers. It is found in Brazil and Paraguay.

== Taxonomy and systematics ==
In the early to mid twentieth century some authors placed Reiser's tyrannulet in genus Xanthomyias; that genus was merged into Phyllomyias in the 1970s. Some of the same authors, and others, treated Reiser's tyrannulet and the greenish tyrannulet (P. virescens) as conspecific. They were separated around the turn of the twentieth century. The two of them and Urich's tyrannulet (P. uruchi) form a superspecies.

Reiser's tyrannulet is monotypic.

== Description ==
Reiser's tyrannulet is 11 to 11.5 cm (4.3 to 4.5 in) long and weighs 7 to 8 g (0.25 to 0.28 oz). The sexes have the same plumage. Adults have a bright olive crown, nape, back, and rump with faint grayish tips on the crown feathers. They have yellowish white lores, supercilium, and cheeks and a thin olive line through the eye. Their wings are dusky with pale yellowish edges on the flight feathers and the ends of the coverts; the last show as two bars on the closed wing. Their tail is dusky olive. Their throat and lower face are whitish and their underparts pale yellow with faint olive streaks on the breast and sides. Their iris is pale brown, their short rounded bill has a blackish maxilla and a black-tipped pinkish to white mandible, and their legs and feet are gray.

== Distribution and habitat ==
Reiser's tyrannulet is found from southern Piauí state in Brazil southwest into east-central Paraguay's Concepción Department. It inhabits subtropical dry deciduous forest and, in the cerrado region, gallery forest .

== Behavior ==
=== Movement ===
Reiser's tyrannulet is believed to be a year-round resident throughout its range.

=== Feeding ===
The diet and foraging behavior of Reiser's tyrannulet have not been studied. It is thought to forage in the canopy and on the edges of the forest.

=== Breeding ===
Nothing is known about the breeding biology of Reiser's tyrannulet.

=== Vocalization ===
The song of Reiser's tyrannulet is a "series of rough, liquid notes moving down the scale, 'briu-briu-briu-briu-briu-briu-briu' ".

== Status ==
The IUCN has assessed Reiser's tyrannulet as being of Least Concern. Its population size is not known and is believed to be decreasing. No immediate threats have been identified. It is considered rare to uncommon and local, known from about 15 locations dispersed along its overall range. It is known from Cavernas do Peruaçu National Park in Brazil. "Severe degradation, destruction and fragmentation of cerradão habitat has already taken place and is ongoing...Its conservation status should be carefully re-evaluated, with a view to possible uplisting to Near Threatened."
