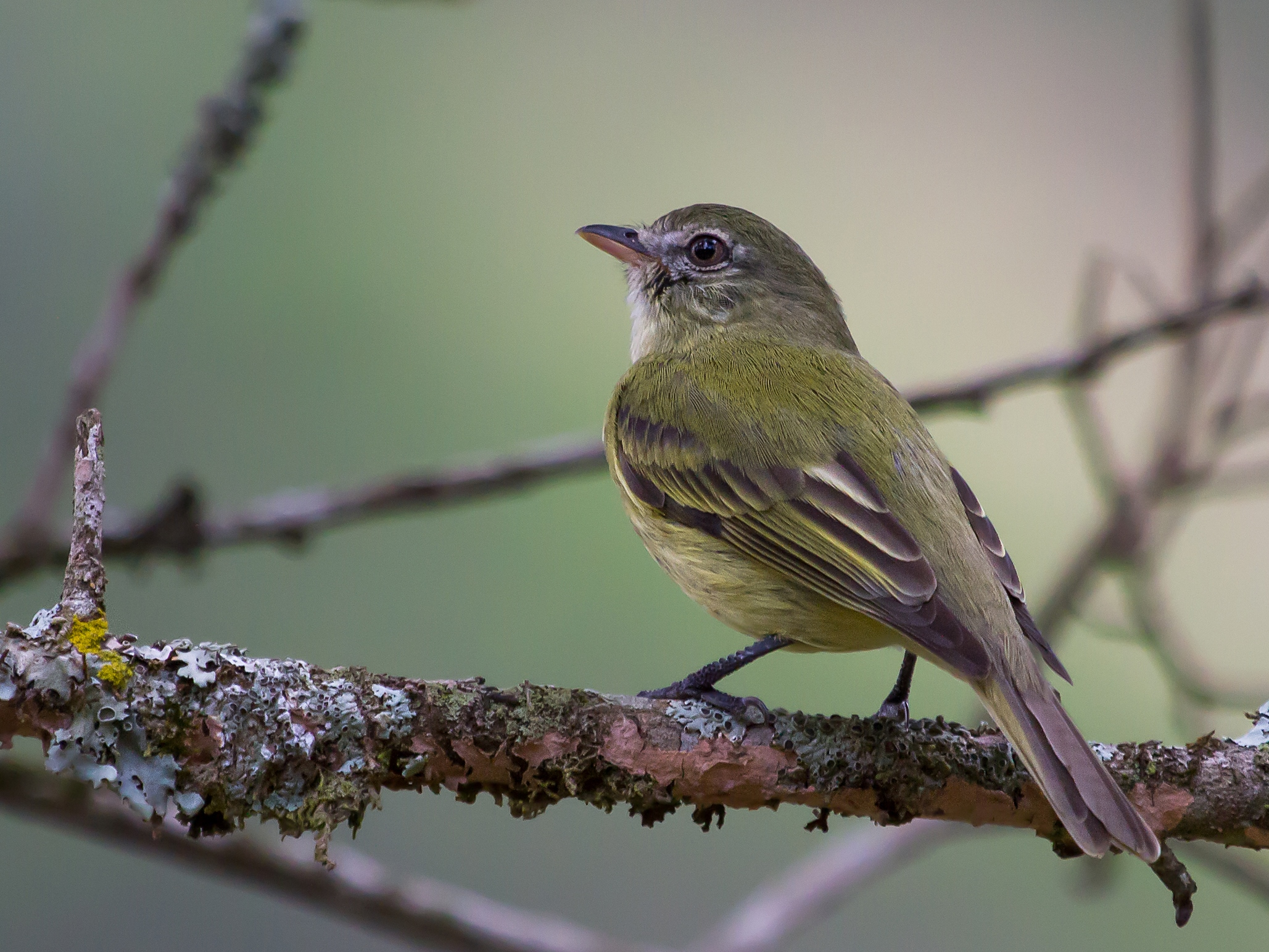

Conservation status
- Least Concern (IUCN 3.1)

Scientific classification
- Kingdom: Animalia
- Phylum: Chordata
- Class: Aves
- Order: Passeriformes
- Family: Tyrannidae
- Genus: Acrochordopus
- Species: A. burmeisteri

Binomial name
- Acrochordopus burmeisteri (Cabanis & Heine, 1860)

Synonyms
- Phyllomyias burmeisteri

= Rough-legged tyrannulet =

Species of bird

The rough-legged tyrannulet (Acrochordopus burmeisteri) is a species of bird in subfamily Elaeniinae of family Tyrannidae, the tyrant flycatchers. It is found in Argentina, Bolivia, Brazil, Paraguay, and Uruguay.

== Taxonomy and systematics ==
The rough-legged tyrannulet has a complicated taxonomic history. It was originally described in 1860 by the German ornithologists Jean Cabanis and Ferdinand Heine as Phyllomyias burmeisteri. During much of the twentieth century it was placed in genus Acrochordopus, which in the 1970s was merged into Phyllomyias. In September 2023 the South American Classification Committee of the American Ornithological Society (SACC) resurrected genus Acrochordopus and moved the rough-legged tyrannulet back into it. The International Ornithological Committee (IOC) followed suit in August 2024. As of September 2024 the Clements taxonomy and BirdLife International's Handbook of the Birds of the World (HBW) retain the species in genus Phyllomyias.

In addition, the rough-legged tyrannulet was formerly considered to be conspecific with the white-fronted tyrannulet (now Acrochordopus zeledoni). They were split by the SACC and IOC in the same reevaluation that led to the restoration of Acrochordopus. The SACC, IOC, Clements, and HBW all recognized the split though the last two retain the white-fronted in Phyllomyias.

The rough-legged tyrannulet is monotypic: No subspecies are recognized.

== Description ==
The rough-legged tyrannulet is about 11 to 12.5 cm (4.3 to 4.9 in) long and weighs about 12.5 g (0.44 oz). The sexes have the same plumage. Adults have an olive crown, nape, back, and rump; the crown is slightly darker than the rest. Their loral streak is white. Their lower face is grizzled whitish. Their wings are dusky with two pale olive-yellow to yellow bars. Their tail is dusky olive. Their throat is white and their underparts yellow with an olive wash on the breast and sides. They have a variable whitish to brown iris, a short thick bill with a blackish maxilla and a mandible that can be half blackish and half whitish to pale yellow or completely the lighter color, and grayish legs and feet with the tiny bumps that give the species its English name.

== Distribution and habitat ==
The rough-legged tyrannulet has a disjunct distribution. One population is found on the eastern slope of the Andes from La Paz Department in Bolivia south to Tucumán Province in Argentina. The other is found from southeastern Bahia to northern Rio Grande do Sul in Brazil, in southeastern Paraguay, and in northeastern Argentina's Misiones Province. In addition, the SACC has records of it as a vagrant in Uruguay. In the Andes the species inhabits montane deciduous forest in the Yungas bioregion. In the east it inhabits the tropical evergreen Atlantic Forest biome. It is usually found in the interior canopy and the forest edges but also in mature secondary forest. In elevation it reaches about 1,800 m (5,900 ft) in Argentina. In Brazil it occurs from sea level to at least 1,500 m (4,900 ft) and in Bolivia ranges between about 1,000 and 1,600 m (3,300 and 5,200 ft).

== Behavior ==
=== Movement ===
The rough-legged tyrannulet is a year-round resident in most of its range. However, those in the southernmost parts of its eastern range apparently move north for the austral winter.

=== Feeding ===
The rough-legged tyrannulet feeds on arthropods and small berries. It forages singly and in pairs and sometimes joins mixed-species feeding flocks. It forages mostly in the forest's mid- and upper levels, taking prey and fruits by gleaning while perched and while briefly hovering.

=== Breeding ===
The rough-legged tyrannulet's breeding season had not been fully defined but spans at least from October to December in the east and August to January in Argentina. A nest in Paraguay was a cup made of twigs and roots covered with lichen. It was about 20 m (66 ft) above the ground on a horizontal branch. One in Argentina was a cup made mostly of Usnea lichen with more leafy lichen on the outside. It was 7.6 m (25 ft) up on a fork in a horizontal branch. Both parents constructed the Argentina nest. The usual clutch size is not known, nor are the incubation period or time to fledging. Both parents are believed to incubate and provision nestlings.

=== Vocalization ===
What is believed to be the rough-legged tyrannulet's song is a "very/extremely high, sharp 'tu-weet' or level/slightly descending 'tweet-tweet--' " that can be repeated as many as nine times. The species is most vocal in the morning.

== Status ==
The IUCN has assessed the rough-legged tyrannulet as being of Least Concern. It has a large range; its population size is not known and is believed to be decreasing. No immediate threats have been identified. It is considered uncommon to locally common in most of its range but rare and very local in Bolivia. It occurs in several protected areas.
