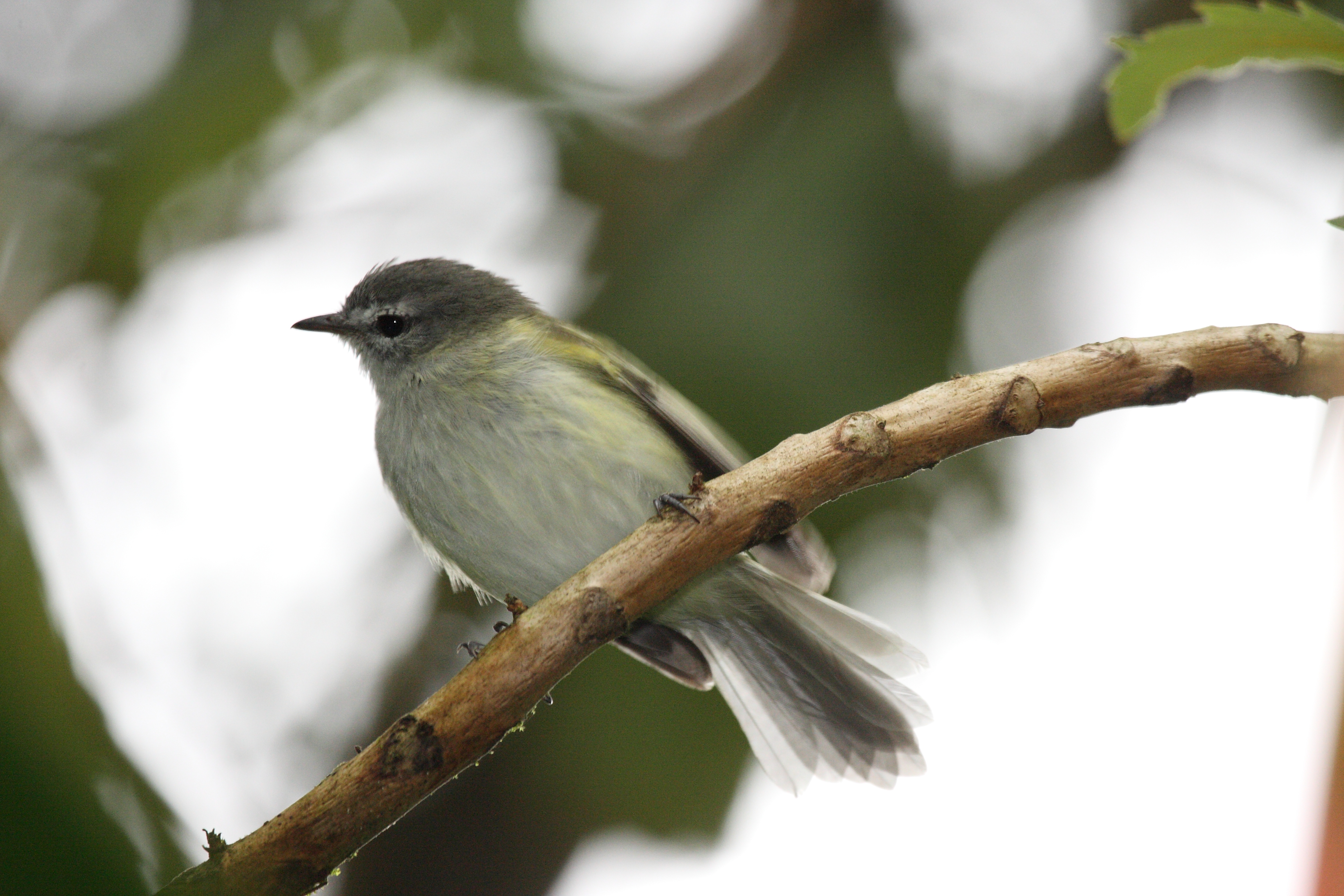

Conservation status
- Least Concern (IUCN 3.1)

Scientific classification
- Kingdom: Animalia
- Phylum: Chordata
- Class: Aves
- Order: Passeriformes
- Family: Tyrannidae
- Genus: Phyllomyias
- Species: P. sclateri

Binomial name
- Phyllomyias sclateri Berlepsch, 1901

= Sclater's tyrannulet =

Species of bird

Sclater's tyrannulet (Phyllomyias sclateri) is a species of bird in subfamily Elaeniinae of family Tyrannidae, the tyrant flycatchers. It is found in Argentina, Bolivia, and Peru.

== Taxonomy and systematics ==
In the early to mid twentieth century some authors placed Sclater's tyrannulet in genus Xanthomyias; that genus was merged into Phyllomyias in the 1970s. The species has two subspecies, the nominate P. s. sclateri (Berlepsch, 1901) and P. s. subtropicalis (Chapman, 1919).

The species' common name and specific epithet commemorate the British zoologist Philip Lutley Sclater.

== Description ==
Sclater's tyrannulet is 11.5 to 12.5 cm (4.5 to 4.9 in) long. The sexes have the same plumage. Adults of the nominate subspecies have a dull olive-green crown, nape, back, and rump with a grayish tinge on the crown. They have whitish lores and narrow supercilium. Their wings are dusky with pale yellow to whitish edges on the flight feathers and the ends of the coverts; the last show as two bars on the closed wing. Their tail is dusky olive. Their throat is grayish white and their lower face grizzled whitish. Their breast is pale gray that becomes pale yellowish on their flanks and belly. Subspecies P. s. subtropicalis compared to the nominate has a purer gray crown, more grayish green upperparts, a wider supercilium, white edges on the flight feathers, and very pale underparts with almost no yellow. Both subspecies have a brown iris, a blackish bill with a paler base to the mandible, and gray legs and feet.

== Distribution and habitat ==
Sclater's tyrannulet is found on the east slope of the Andes. The nominate subspecies is found in Bolivia from La Paz Department south through Tarija Department and into northwestern Argentina as are as Tucumán Province. Subspecies P. s. subtropicalis is found in southeastern Peru in Cuzco and Puno departments. The species primarily inhabits the interior of humid montane forest and cloudforest; it also occurs at the forest edges and in clearings and woodlands heavy with alder (Alnus). In elevation it occurs between 1,500 and 2,000 m (4,900 and 6,600 ft) in Peru and northern Bolivia and between 400 and 1,500 m (1,300 and 4,900 ft) in southern Bolivia and Argentina.

== Behavior ==
=== Movement ===
Sclater's tyrannulet is believed to be a year-round resident throughout its range.

=== Feeding ===
Sclater's tyrannulet feeds on insects. It forages mostly in the forest canopy but also in its mid-level. It captures prey from vegetation by gleaning while perched and while briefly hovering. It often joins mixed-species foraging flocks dominated by Thraupidae tanagers.

=== Breeding ===
The breeding season of Sclater's tyrannulet has not been defined. One nest was an open cup made of twigs and lined with feathers; it was built in a clump of epiphytes on a tree branch. The clutch size, incubation period, time to fledging, and details of parental care are not known.

=== Vocalization ===
What is thought to be the song of Sclater's tyrannulet is "a deep, gruff chanting: djeer djeer djeer djeer interspersed with sharper tchik tchik thcik notes".

== Status ==
The IUCN has assessed Sclater's tyrannulet as being of Least Concern. Its population size is not known and is believed to be decreasing. No immediate threats have been identified. It is considered rare to uncommon across its range. It occurs in several protected areas.
