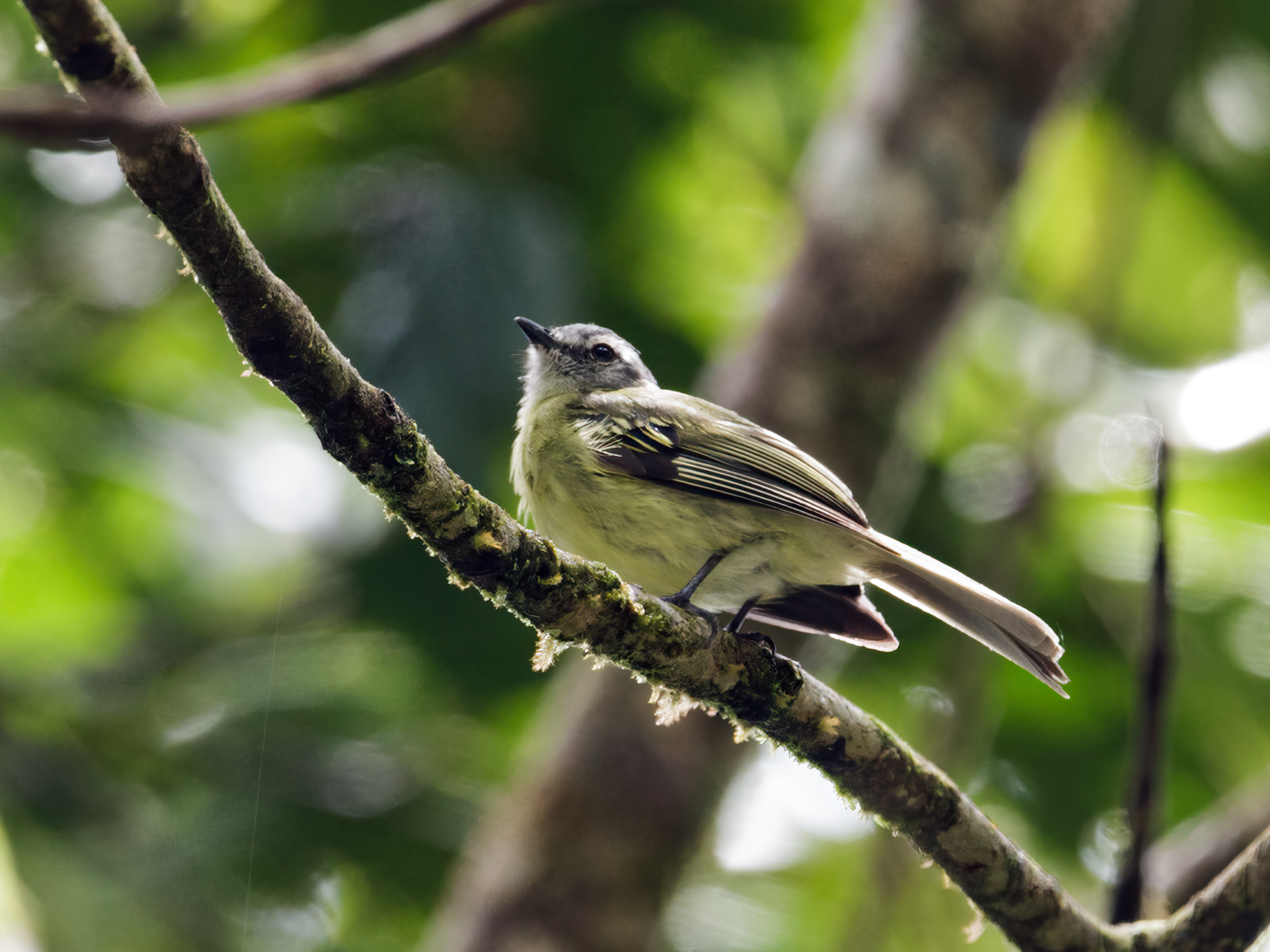

Conservation status
- Least Concern (IUCN 3.1)

Scientific classification
- Kingdom: Animalia
- Phylum: Chordata
- Class: Aves
- Order: Passeriformes
- Family: Tyrannidae
- Genus: Phyllomyias
- Species: P. plumbeiceps

Binomial name
- Phyllomyias plumbeiceps (Lawrence, 1869)

Synonyms
- Pogonotriccus plumbeiceps; Oreotriccus plumbeiceps

= Plumbeous-crowned tyrannulet =

Species of bird

The plumbeous-crowned tyrannulet (Phyllomyias plumbeiceps) is a species of bird in subfamily Elaeniinae of family Tyrannidae, the tyrant flycatchers. It is found in Colombia, Ecuador, and Peru.

== Taxonomy and systematics ==
The plumbeous-crowned tyrannulet was originally described as Pogonotriccus plumbeiceps. It was moved to genus Oreotriccus in the early twentieth century, and Oreotriccus was then merged into Phyllomyias following a 1977 publication.

The plumbeous-crowned tyrannulet is monotypic.

== Description ==
The plumbeous-crowned tyrannulet is about 11.5 cm (4.5 in) long. Males weigh about 11 g (0.39 oz) and females about 8 g (0.28 oz). The sexes have the same plumage. Adults have a gray crown and bright olive nape, back, and rump. Their lores and supercilium are white with a dusky stripe through their eye. Their lower face is pale gray or whitish. Their wings are dusky with yellow to yellowish white edges on most flight feathers and the ends of the coverts. Their tail is dusky olive. Their throat is grayish white, their breast and flanks yellow with an olive wash, and their belly bright yellow. They have a brown to gray-brown iris, a black bill with sometimes a brown or pinkish cream base to the mandible, and gray or dark gray legs and feet.

== Distribution and habitat ==
The plumbeous-crowned tyrannulet has a disjunct distribution along the Andes. It is found in all three of Colombia's Andean ranges, on the east slope through Ecuador, and on the east slope through most of Peru. It inhabits the interior and edges of humid montane forest in the subtropical and tropical zones. In elevation it occurs between 1,300 and 2,300 m (4,300 and 7,500 ft) in Colombia, between 1,200 and 2,200 m (3,900 and 7,200 ft) in Ecuador, and between 1,200 and 1,900 m (3,900 and 6,200 ft) in Peru.

== Behavior ==
=== Movement ===
The plumbeous-crowned tyrannulet is a year-round resident throughout its range.

=== Feeding ===
The plumbeous-crowned tyrannulet's diet has not been detailed. It is known to feed on insects and probably also eats small fruits and berries. It forages singly or in pairs and often joins mixed-species feeding flocks. It forages from the forest's mid-level to the canopy, typically taking prey and fruits while briefly hovering.

=== Breeding ===
Nothing is known about the plumbeous-crowned tyrannulet's breeding biology.

=== Vocalization ===
The plumbeous-crowned tyrannulet sings more loudly than expected for its small size. One description of its song is "a series of 5-8 short hard notes 'pik pik pik pik pik'...given at relatively long intervals". Another is "a slightly accelerating, rising or rising-falling series of sharp, moderate-pitched notes: pip-pip-PIP-PIP-PIP-pip, sometimes ending with a lower trill: pip-pip-PIP-PIPtrr. Its call is "a rich rising-falling chatter: drr'r'I'I'I'r'r'r".

== Status ==
The IUCN has assessed the plumbeous-crowned tyrannulet as being of Least Concern. It has a large range; its population size is not known and is believed to be stable. No immediate threats have been identified. It is considered uncommon in Colombia, "scarce (but easy to overlook, and doubtless underrecorded)" in Ecuador, and "rare to uncommon but probably overlooked; locally may be fairly common" in Peru. "As a species that depends upon forest, Plumbeous-crowned Tyrannulet potentially is at risk from human activities that destroy or degrade forests, such as expanding agriculture, mining, road construction, and logging".
