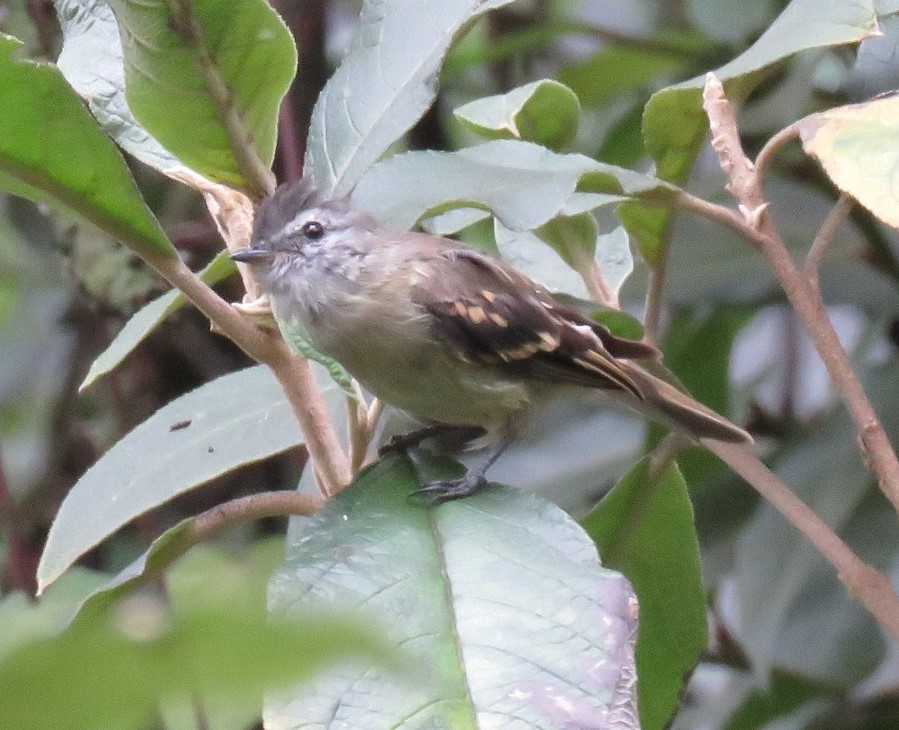

Conservation status
- Least Concern (IUCN 3.1)

Scientific classification
- Kingdom: Animalia
- Phylum: Chordata
- Class: Aves
- Order: Passeriformes
- Family: Tyrannidae
- Genus: Tyranniscus
- Species: T. uropygialis

Binomial name
- Tyranniscus uropygialis (Lawrence, 1869)

Synonyms
- Mecocerculus uropygialis; Phyllomyias uropygialis

= Tawny-rumped tyrannulet =

Species of bird

The tawny-rumped tyrannulet (Tyranniscus uropygialis) is a species of bird in subfamily Elaeniinae of family Tyrannidae, the tyrant flycatchers. It is found in Bolivia, Colombia, Ecuador, Peru, Venezuela, and possibly Argentina.

== Taxonomy and systematics ==
The tawny-rumped tyrannulet was originally described as Mecocerculus uropygialis. During much of the twentieth century it was placed in genus Tyranniscus and in the 1970s was transferred to genus Phyllomyias. A study published in 2020 showed that Phyllomyias was polyphyletic and that the tawny-rumped and several other tyrannulets did not belong in it. In September 2023 the South American Classification Committee of the American Ornithological Society (SACC) resurrected genus Tyranniscus and moved the tawny-rumped tyrannulet back into it. The International Ornithological Committee (IOC) followed suit in August 2024. As of September 2024 the Clements taxonomy and BirdLife International's Handbook of the Birds of the World (HBW) retain the species in genus Phyllomyias.

The tawny-rumped tyrannulet is monotypic.

== Description ==
The tawny-rumped tyrannulet is about 10 to 11.5 cm (3.9 to 4.5 in) long and weighs about 8 to 9 g (0.28 to 0.32 oz). The sexes have the same plumage. Adults have a dark brown crown. Their nape and back are brownish olive and their rump and uppertail coverts bright cinnamon. They have white lores and supercilium. They have a thin dark line through the eye and a grayish lower face. Their wings are dark brown with two bright buffy bars, yellow edges to the inner flight feathers, and bright orange-buff edges to the outer ones. Their tail is dusky. Their throat is grayish white, their breast and flanks olive-brown, and their belly yellow to yellowish white. They have a dark brown iris, a small and rounded black bill, and black legs and feet.

== Distribution and habitat ==
The tawny-rumped tyrannulet has a disjunct distribution. It is found in the Andes of Venezuela's Mérida state, in Colombia's Eastern Andes south to western Meta Department, in Colombia's Western Andes in Cauca and Nariño departments, in Ecuador on both Andean slopes, in Peru on most of the eastern Andean slope and with a few records in the northern part of the western, and in Bolivia's Andes south to Tarija Department. Unconfirmed sight records in far northwestern Argentina lead the South American Classification Committee of the American Ornithological Society to rate it as hypothetical in that country. The species inhabits humid montane forest in the subtropical and temperate zones. There it favors areas of dense growth such as thickets, the edges of clearings, shrubby edges near treeline, bushy ravines, elfin forest, and stands of Chusquea bamboo. In elevation it occurs at about 3,100 m (10,200 ft) in Venezuela, between 1,800 and 2,800 m (5,900 and 9,200 ft) in Colombia, mostly between 2,100 and 3,100 m (6,900 and 10,200 ft) in Ecuador, and mostly between 2,500 and 3,600 m (8,200 and 11,800 ft) but locally down to 1,800 m (5,900 ft) in Peru.

== Behavior ==
=== Movement ===
The tawny-rumped tyrannulet is believed to be a year-round resident in most of its range but is suspected to make slight elevational movements.

=== Feeding ===
The tawny-rumped tyrannulet feeds on insects and probably also small fruits. It forages singly and in pairs, usually as part of a mixed-species feeding flock. It forages mostly in the forest's canopy or in the upper part of shrubby vegetation, taking prey by gleaning while perched and while briefly hovering.

=== Breeding ===
Nothing is known about the tawny-rumped tyrannulet's breeding biology beyond that a fledgling was noted in December in Bolivia.

=== Vocalization ===
The tawny-rumped tyrannulet's song is an "[i]nconspicuous 2-note 'tseep-tseep' or 'tzeep, zéé-u', singly or in series", and is sung most often in the early morning. It has also been put into words as "tzeep, TEASE-you", "pseee-psít", and "squee squeeze-it".

== Status ==
The IUCN has assessed the tawny-rumped tyrannulet as being of Least Concern. It has a large range; its population size is not known and is believed to be stable. No immediate threats have been identified. It is considered "numerous" in Venezuela, "uncommon" in Colombia, "uncommon to locally fairly common" on the east slope in Peru and rare on the western, and common in Bolivia. It occurs in many national parks in Ecuador, Peru, and Bolivia and "exhibits tolerance of degraded habitats and is unlikely to become threatened in immediate future.
