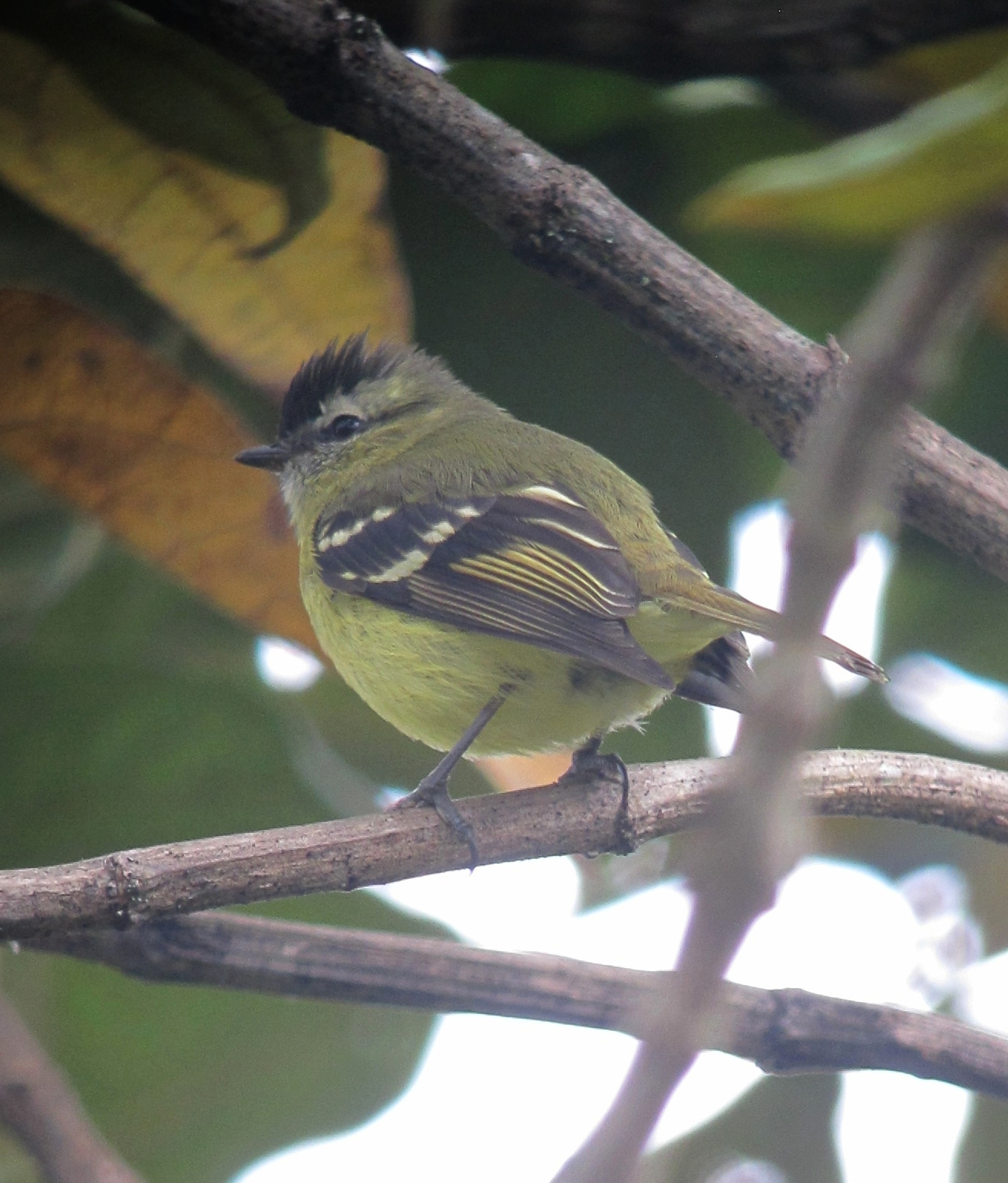
- Black-capped tyrannulet (Tyranniscus nigrocapillus)

Scientific classification
- Kingdom: Animalia
- Phylum: Chordata
- Class: Aves
- Order: Passeriformes
- Family: Tyrannidae
- Genus: Tyranniscus; Cabanis and Heine, 1860

Type species
- Tyrannulus nigricapillus Black-capped tyrannulet Lafresnaye, 1845

= Tyranniscus =

Genus of birds

Tyranniscus is a genus of small passerine birds in the tyrant flycatcher family Tyrannidae. The genus contains three species.

== Taxonomy ==
The genus Tyranniscus was introduced in 1860 by the German ornithologists Jean Cabanis and Ferdinand Heine to accommodate a single species, Tyrannulus nigricapillus, the black-capped tyrannulet, that had first been formally described in 1845 by French ornithologist Frédéric de Lafresnaye. The genus name is a diminutive of the Ancient Greek τυραννος/turannos meaning "tyrant".

The genus contains three species:

- Black-capped tyrannulet, Tyranniscus nigrocapillus
- Ashy-headed tyrannulet, Tyranniscus cinereiceps
- Tawny-rumped tyrannulet, Tyranniscus uropygialis

These species were formerly placed in the genus Phyllomyias. A large molecular phylogenetic study by Michael Harvey and collaborators published in 2020 found that the genus Phyllomyias was paraphyletic. As part of the reorganization to create monophyletic genera, the genus Tyranniscus was resurrected to contain the above three species.
