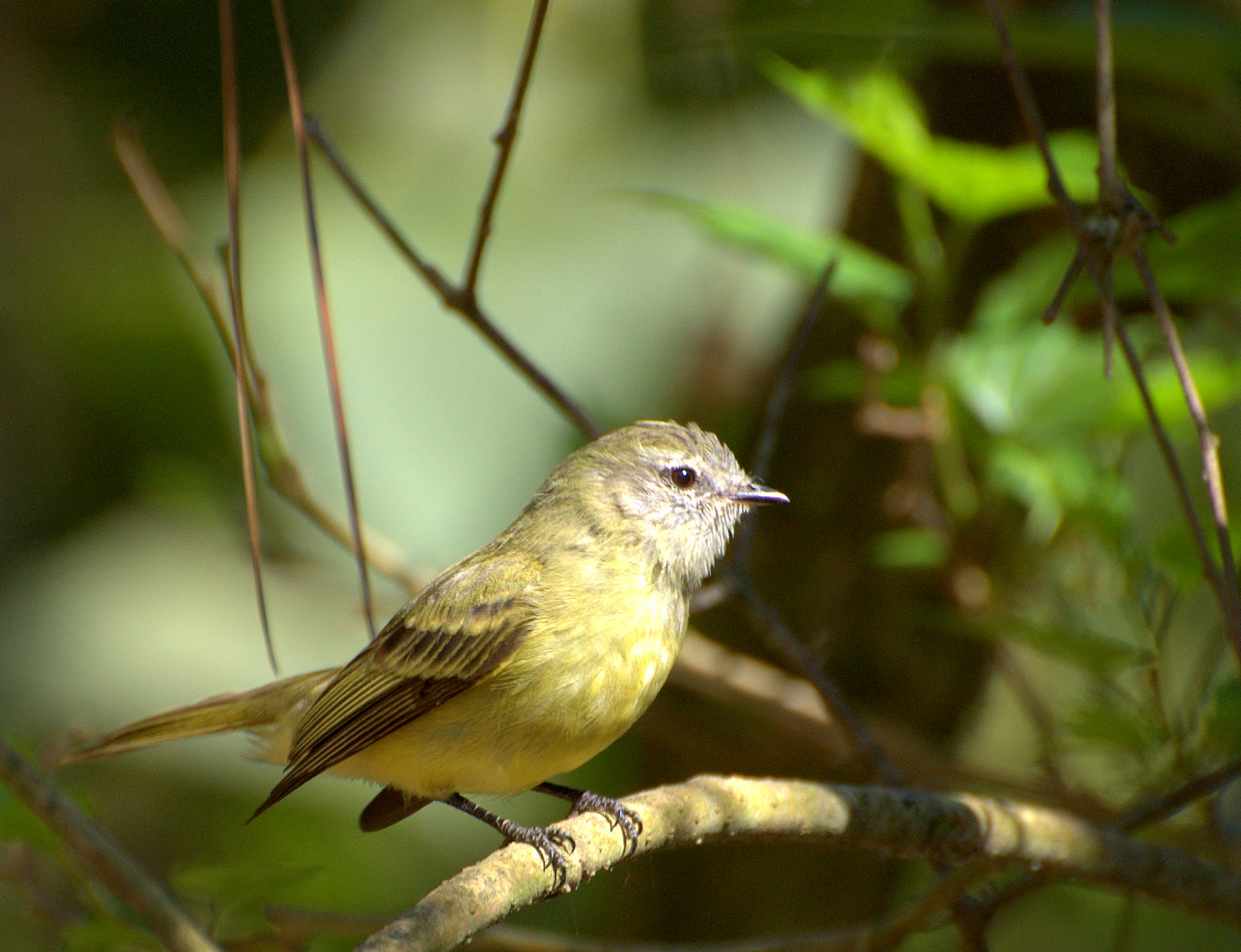
- Planalto tyrannulet (Phyllomyias fasciatus)

Scientific classification
- Kingdom: Animalia
- Phylum: Chordata
- Class: Aves
- Order: Passeriformes
- Family: Tyrannidae
- Genus: Phyllomyias; Cabanis & Heine, 1860

Type species
- Platyrhynchus brevirostris Planalto tyrannulet Spix, 1825

= Phyllomyias =

Genus of birds

Phyllomyias is a genus of small birds in the tyrant-flycatcher family Tyrannidae. They are found in wooded habitats of Central and South America. Some species are among the most common birds in their range, while other are rare and threatened. They have a short, stubby bill, are greenish above, yellowish or whitish below, and all except the sooty-headed tyrannulet have pale wing-bars or edging. They feed on small arthropods and fruits. Most species regularly take part in mixed species flocks.

== Taxonomy ==
The genus Phyllomyias was introduced in 1860 by the German ornithologists Jean Cabanis and Ferdinand Heine. The genus name combines the Ancient Greek φυλλον/phullon meaning "leaf" with Modern Latin myias meaning "flycatcher". The type species was subsequently designated in 1888 by Philip Sclater as Platyrhynchus brevirostris Spix, now a subspecies of the Planalto tyrannulet.

== Species ==
The genus formerly included more species. A molecular phylogenetic study published in 2020 found that the genus was paraphyletic. In the rearrangement to create monophyletic genera three species were moved to the resurrected genus Tyranniscus and two species to the resurrected genus Acrochordopus. The genus Phyllomyias now contains 9 species:

Image	Common name	Scientific name	Distribution
	Greenish tyrannulet	Phyllomyias virescens	Argentina, Brazil, and Paraguay
	Reiser's tyrannulet	Phyllomyias reiseri	central Brazil and northern Paraguay
	Urich's tyrannulet	Phyllomyias urichi	Venezuela
	Sclater's tyrannulet	Phyllomyias sclateri	Argentina, Bolivia, and Peru
	Yungas tyrannulet	Phyllomyias weedeni	north-western Bolivia and far south-eastern Peru
	Planalto tyrannulet	Phyllomyias fasciatus	eastern Brazil, extreme north-eastern Bolivia, eastern Paraguay, and far north-eastern Argentina
	Sooty-headed tyrannulet	Phyllomyias griseiceps	Brazil, Colombia, Ecuador, Guyana, Panama, Peru, and Venezuela
	Plumbeous-crowned tyrannulet	Phyllomyias plumbeiceps	Colombia, Ecuador, and Peru
	Grey-capped tyrannulet	Phyllomyias griseocapilla	Brazil
