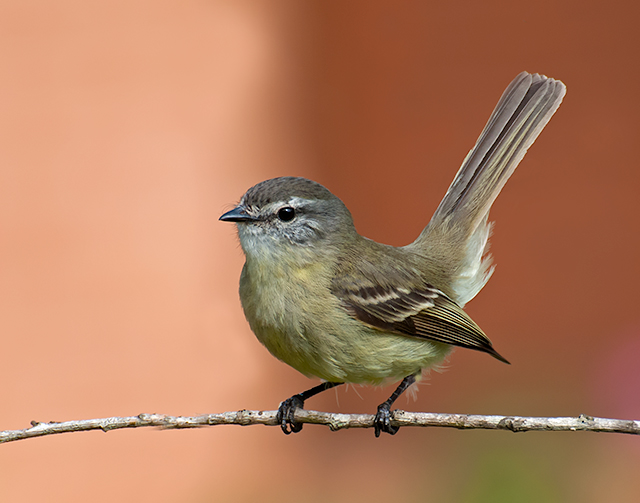
- In São Paulo, Brazil

Conservation status
- Least Concern (IUCN 3.1)

Scientific classification
- Kingdom: Animalia
- Phylum: Chordata
- Class: Aves
- Order: Passeriformes
- Family: Tyrannidae
- Genus: Phyllomyias
- Species: P. fasciatus

Binomial name
- Phyllomyias fasciatus (Thunberg, 1822)

= Planalto tyrannulet =

Species of bird

The planalto tyrannulet (Phyllomyias fasciatus) is a species of bird in subfamily Elaeniinae of family Tyrannidae, the tyrant flycatchers. It is found in Argentina, Bolivia, Brazil, and Paraguay.

== Taxonomy and systematics ==
The planalto tyrannulet has three subspecies, the nominate P. f. fasciatus (Thunberg, 1822), P. f. caerae (Hellmayr, 1927), and P. f. brevirostris (Spix, 1825). P. f. caerae might merit recognition as a separate species.

== Description ==
The planalto tyrannulet is 11 to 11.5 cm (4.3 to 4.5 in) long. The sexes have the same plumage. Adults of the nominate subspecies have dull grayish-olive to brownish-olive crowns, napes, backs, and rumps, with the crown being the grayest part. Their lores, supercilium, partial eyering, and lower face are whitish with a dark stripe through their eye. Their wings are dusky with pale olive to whitish edges to the flight feathers and the ends of the coverts; The latter show as two pale bars on the closed wing. Their tail is dusky. Their throat is whitish and their underparts yellow with an olive wash on the breast and sides. Subspecies P. f. brevirostris has darker olive upperparts than the nominate, with pale olive (not whitish) on the wings and wing coverts, a smaller area of white on the throat, and darker yellow underparts. P. f. caerae resembles brevirostris but has a darker brown crown, duller and less yellow upperparts, and underparts midway between those of the other two subspecies. All subspecies have a brown iris, a short stubby blackish bill, and gray legs and feet.

== Distribution and habitat ==
The nominate subspecies of the planalto tyrannulet is found in eastern Brazil in an area bounded roughly by eastern Pará, western Bahia, southern Mato Grosso, and southern Goiás and from there into extreme northeastern Bolivia in Santa Cruz Department. Subspecies P. f. brevirostris is found in southeastern Brazil from Minas Gerais and Espírito Santo south to Rio Grande do Sul, in eastern Paraguay, and in northeastern Argentina's Misiones Province. P. f. caerae is found in northeastern Brazil from Ceará and Rio Grande do Norte south to Sergipe. The species primarily inhabits humid tropical evergreen forest. It is found less often in semi-deciduous woodland and gallery forest. In elevation it ranges between sea level and 1,800 m (5,900 ft) but is most numerous between 500 and 800 m (1,600 and 2,600 ft).

== Behavior ==
=== Movement ===
The planalto tyrannulet is a year-round resident in most or all of its range; there is some evidence that the population in Rio Grande do Sul moves north after the austral summer.

=== Feeding ===
The planalto tyrannulet feeds on insects and small fruits. It typically forages singly or in pairs in the forest canopy and often joins mixed-species feeding flocks. It takes prey from vegetation by gleaning while perched and while briefly hovering.

=== Breeding ===
The planalto tyrannulet breeds between September and February. One nest was a cup made from moss and fungal hypha covered inside and out with lichen. It was 7 m (23 ft) above the ground in a branch crotch and contained two eggs. The incubation period, time to fledging, and details of parental care are not known.

=== Vocalization ===
The planalto tyrannulet's song differs geographically. In the southeastern part of its range it sings "a slow series of 3-4 slightly descending, plaintive 'puh-puh--' minor-key notes". Elsewhere it sings a "slightly higher-pitched and more distinctly descending series of 3 more major-keyed notes".

== Status ==
The IUCN has assessed the planalto tyrannulet as being of Least Concern. It has a large range; its population size is not known and is believed to be decreasing. No immediate threats have been identified. It is considered fairly common to locally common in much of its range and occurs in several protected areas in Brazil.
