= Andean tyrant =

Andean tyrant has been split into 2 species:

- Jelski's black tyrant, Knipolegus signatus
- Plumbeous tyrant, Knipolegus cabanisi
