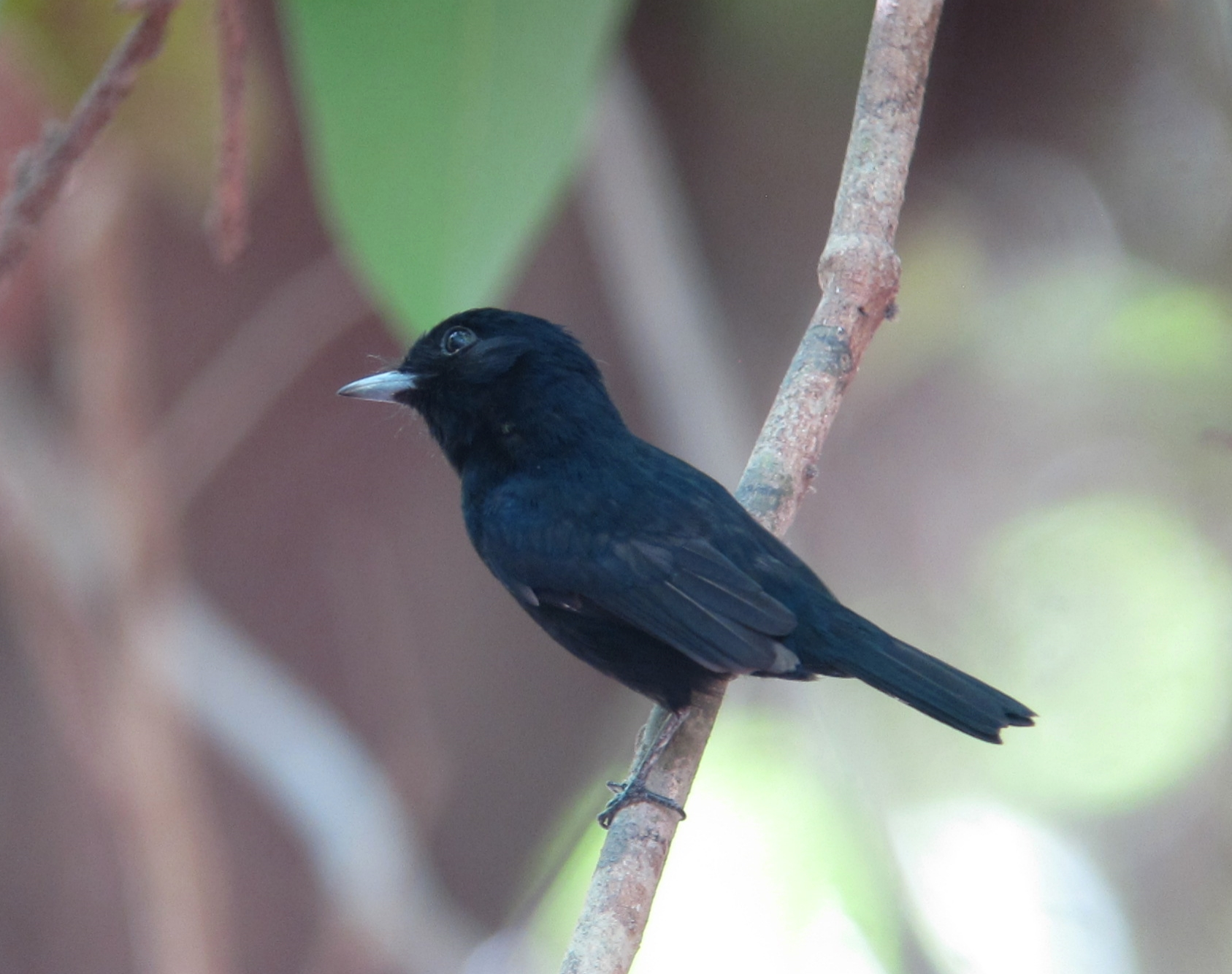

Conservation status
- Least Concern (IUCN 3.1)

Scientific classification
- Kingdom: Animalia
- Phylum: Chordata
- Class: Aves
- Order: Passeriformes
- Family: Tyrannidae
- Genus: Knipolegus
- Species: K. poecilocercus

Binomial name
- Knipolegus poecilocercus (Pelzeln, 1868)

= Amazonian black tyrant =

Amazonian black-tyrant

Species of bird

The Amazonian black-tyrant (Knipolegus poecilocercus) is a species of bird in the family Tyrannidae, the tyrant flycatchers. It is particularly native to riverbanks of the Amazon rainforest.

== Taxonomy and systematics ==
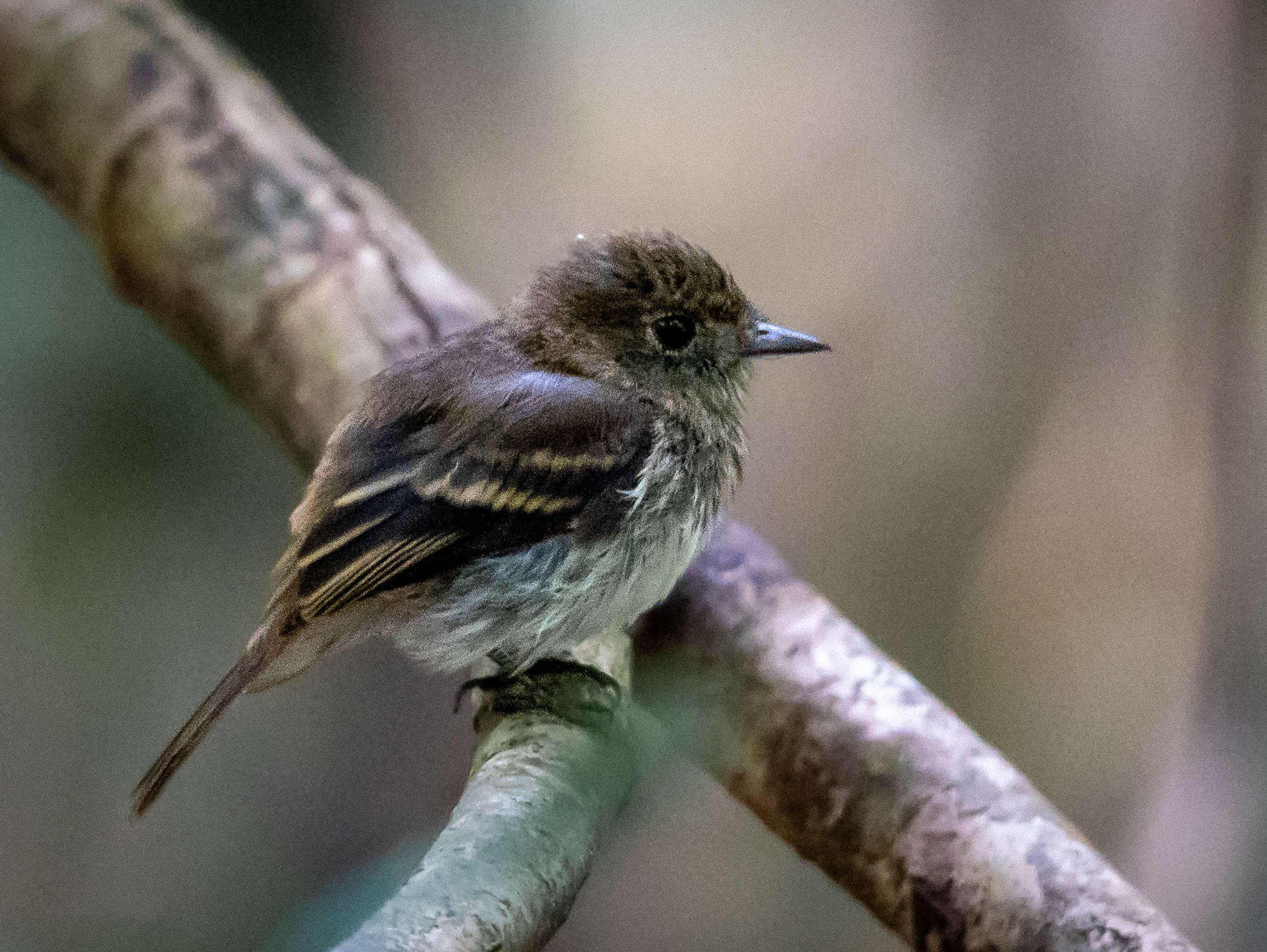
A female Amazonian black tyrant in Anavilhanas National Park, Novo Airão, Amazonas, Brazil

The Amazonian black tyrant was formally described by August von Pelzeln in 1868 as Empidochanes coecilocerecus. It was later transferred to genus Phaeotriccus which was still later merged into Knipolegus.

The Amazonian black tyrant is monotypic. It is called "maria-preta-do-igapó" in Brazilian Portuguese, "Viudita-negra Amazónica" in Ecuadorian and Peruvian Spanish, and "Atrapamoscas Remoloncito" in Venezuelan Spanish.

== Description ==
The Amazonian black tyrant is about 12.7 to 13.5 cm (5.0 to 5.3 in) long and weighs about 14 g (0.49 oz). It has unusually large eyes. Adult males are almost entirely glossy black with a slight bluish sheen. Their primaries have a brownish tinge. Adult females have a mostly olive-brown head and upperparts with grayish white lores and eye-ring and rufous uppertail coverts. Their wings are dusky with buff edges on the flight feathers and cinnamon-buff tips on the coverts that show as two wing bars. Their tail is dusky with cinnamon edges on the feathers. Their underparts are mostly pale buff with brownish olive streaks on the lower throat, across the breast, and along the flanks. Both sexes have a dark brown iris and black legs and feet. Males have a bluish or bluish gray bill with a black tip; female's bills are dusky brown. It and the riverside tyrant (H. orenocensis) are very similar, but the riverside is larger and generally inhabits more open landscapes.

== Distribution and habitat ==
The Amazonian black tyrant is found from eastern Colombia east into western Venezuela's Apure state and south through its Amazonas state into northwestern Brazil and western Guyana. It also ranges along the Ucayali River in northeastern Peru to the upper Amazon and in Brazil along the Amazonian tributary rivers Negro, Branco, Madeira, lower Xingu, and Tocantins, and along the Amazon's main stem to its delta. There is an isolated population in extreme eastern Ecuador and sightings have been documented in Suriname.

The Amazonian black tyrant inhabits várzea forest where it favors understory thickets and areas near open water with dense vines. In Ecuador and Peru it is known almost entirely at blackwater rivers and lakes. In elevation it ranges from sea level to 350 m (1,100 ft) in Brazil and up to 300 m (1,000 ft) in Colombia and 200 m (700 ft) in Venezuela and Ecuador.

== Behavior ==
=== Movement ===
The Amazonian black tyrant is a year-round resident.

=== Feeding ===
The Amazonian black tyrant feeds on insects. It usually forages singly or in pairs, and females sometimes join mixed-species feeding flocks. It perches within about 2 m (7 ft) of the ground and usually in cover. It takes prey mostly with sallies to glean it from foliage; it also sometimes takes it on the ground or in mid-air close over water.

=== Breeding ===
The Amazonian black tyrant's breeding season has not been defined but includes February in Venezuela and July in Brazil. Males make a display in which they jump vertically from a perch, calls "see-sa'lik" in mid-air, and drop to the original perch. The species' one known nest was "an untidy ball of moss and grass" in a branch fork about 1 m (3 ft) above the ground by a small stream. Nothing else is known about the species' breeding biology.

=== Vocal and non-vocal sounds ===
The Amazonian black tyrant is usually quiet. Displaying males make a "see-sa'lik" call and a "faint clicking ic-dik" that might be from their wings. They also make a buzzy "bzzééa" and a "high tsik". Females make a loud "pit-pit" call.

== Status ==
The IUCN has assessed the Amazonian black tyrant as being of Least Concern. It has a large range; its population size is not known and is believed to be decreasing. No immediate threats have been identified. Though its range overall encompasses 4,960,000 km^{2} (1,920,000 sq mi) it is not known how much of it the species actually occupies. The Amazonian black tyrant is considered "uncommon" in Colombia, "rare and local" in Ecuador, "locally common" in Venezuela, and "apparently very local" in Peru. It occurs in a few protected areas in Venezuela and Brazil.
