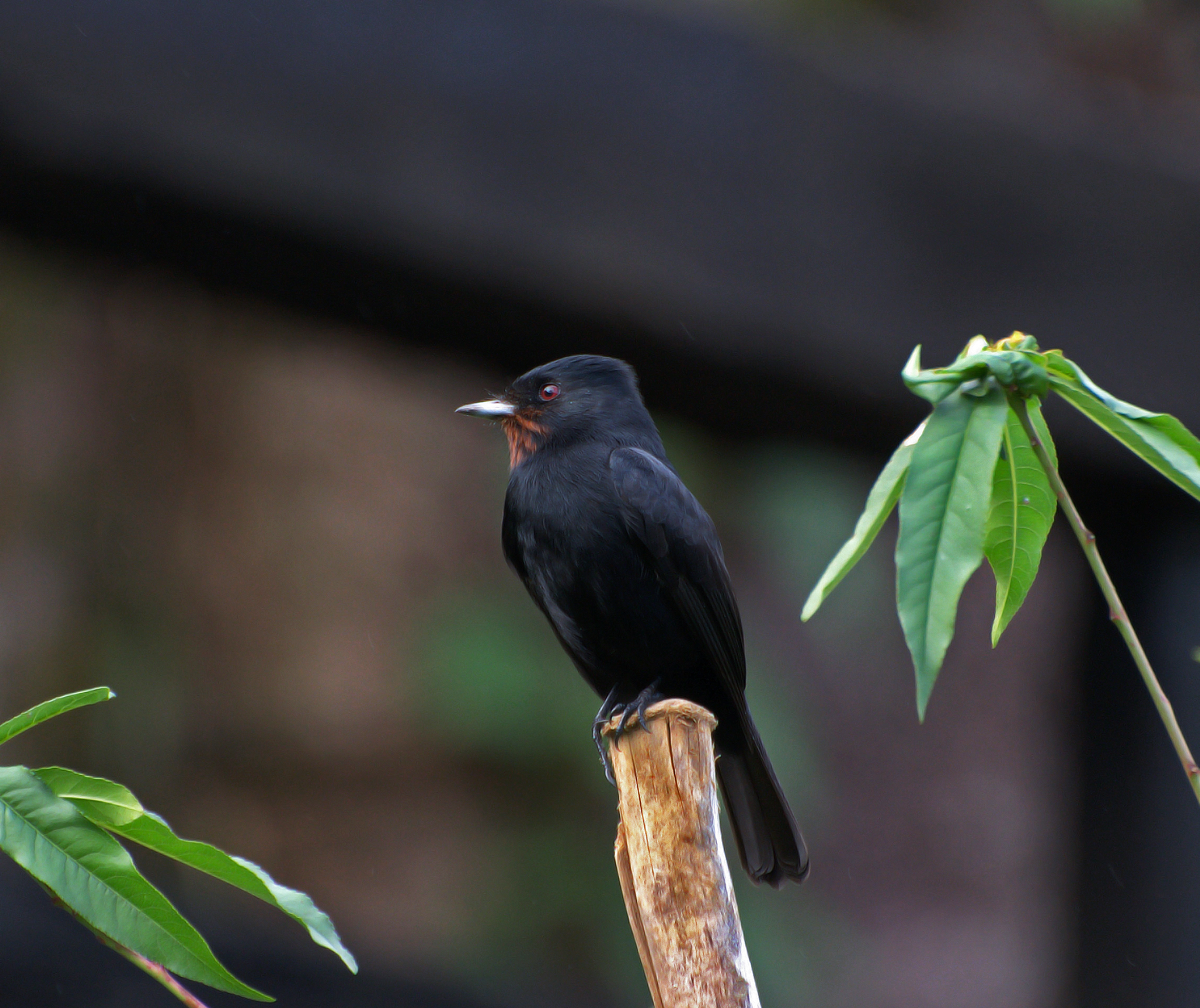
- In Parque Nacional do Itatiaia, Rio de Janeiro, Brazil

Conservation status
- Least Concern (IUCN 3.1)

Scientific classification
- Kingdom: Animalia
- Phylum: Chordata
- Class: Aves
- Order: Passeriformes
- Family: Tyrannidae
- Genus: Knipolegus
- Species: K. nigerrimus

Binomial name
- Knipolegus nigerrimus (Vieillot, 1818)

= Velvety black tyrant =

Species of bird

The velvety black tyrant (Knipolegus nigerrimus) is a species of bird in the family Tyrannidae, the tyrant flycatchers. It is endemic to Brazil.

== Taxonomy and systematics ==
The velvety black tyrant was formally described in 1818 as Muscicapa nigerrima, placing it in the Old World flycatcher family. It was later transferred to genus Knipolegus, which was erected in 1826 with the blue-billed black tyrant (K. cyanirostris) as the type species.

The velvety black tyrant's taxonomy is unsettled. The IOC and BirdLife International's Handbook of the Birds of the World assign it two subspecies, the nominate M. n. nigerrimus (Vieillot, 1818) and M. n. hoflingae (Frederico Lencioni-Neto, 1996). The Clements taxonomy does not recognize hoflingae, treating the species as monotypic.

This article follows the two-subspecies model.

== Description ==
The velvety black tyrant is 17.5 to 18 cm (6.9 to 7.1 in) long. Adult males of the nominate subspecies are almost entirely glossy blue-black and have a small bushy crest. Their primaries have white bases that are conspicuous in flight but usually not visible at rest. Adult females are also mostly glossy blue-black. They do not have a crest but have a black-streaked chestnut throat. Subspecies M. n. hoflingae is smaller than the nominate. Males have brown primaries and females have a smaller throat patch than the nominate. Both sexes of both subspecies have a dark red iris, a pale bluish gray bill, and black legs and feet.

== Distribution and habitat ==
The velvety black tyrant has a disjunct distribution. The nominate subspecies is found in the southeast, from Minas Gerais and Espirito Santo south to Rio Grande do Sul. Subspecies M. n. hoflingae is found further north, in eastern Brazil between Pernambuco and central Bahia. It inhabits montane grasslands, typically those with rocky areas and some trees and shrubs that the species tends to be near. In elevation it mostly ranges between 1,800 and 2,700 m (5,900 and 8,900 ft) but locally is found as low as 700 m (2,300 ft).

== Behavior ==
=== Movement ===
The velvety black tyrant is mostly a year-round resident though some elevational migration by the nominate subspecies has been noted in Rio de Janeiro state.

=== Feeding ===
The velvety black tyrant feeds on insects. It usually forages in pairs, sallying for prey from a perch low in a bush or tree.

=== Breeding ===
Almost nothing definite is known about the velvety black tyrant's breeding biology. Males make a display flight. The species is thought to nest in burrows among rocks near a stream.

=== Vocalization ===
As of April 2025 xeno-canto had eight recordings of velvety black tyrant vocalizations; the Cornell Lab of Ornithology's Macaulay Library had one of them and five others. Males make "a short high See" in their display flight. Their call is "a somewhat hoarse sounding dry trilling note krrr [or sometimes] See.rrrrr".

== Status ==
The IUCN has assessed the velvety black tyrant as being of Least Concern. It has a large range; its population size is not known and is believed to be stable. No immediate threats have been identified. It is considered generally uncommon to fairly common but locally common. It occurs in several national parks and preserves.
