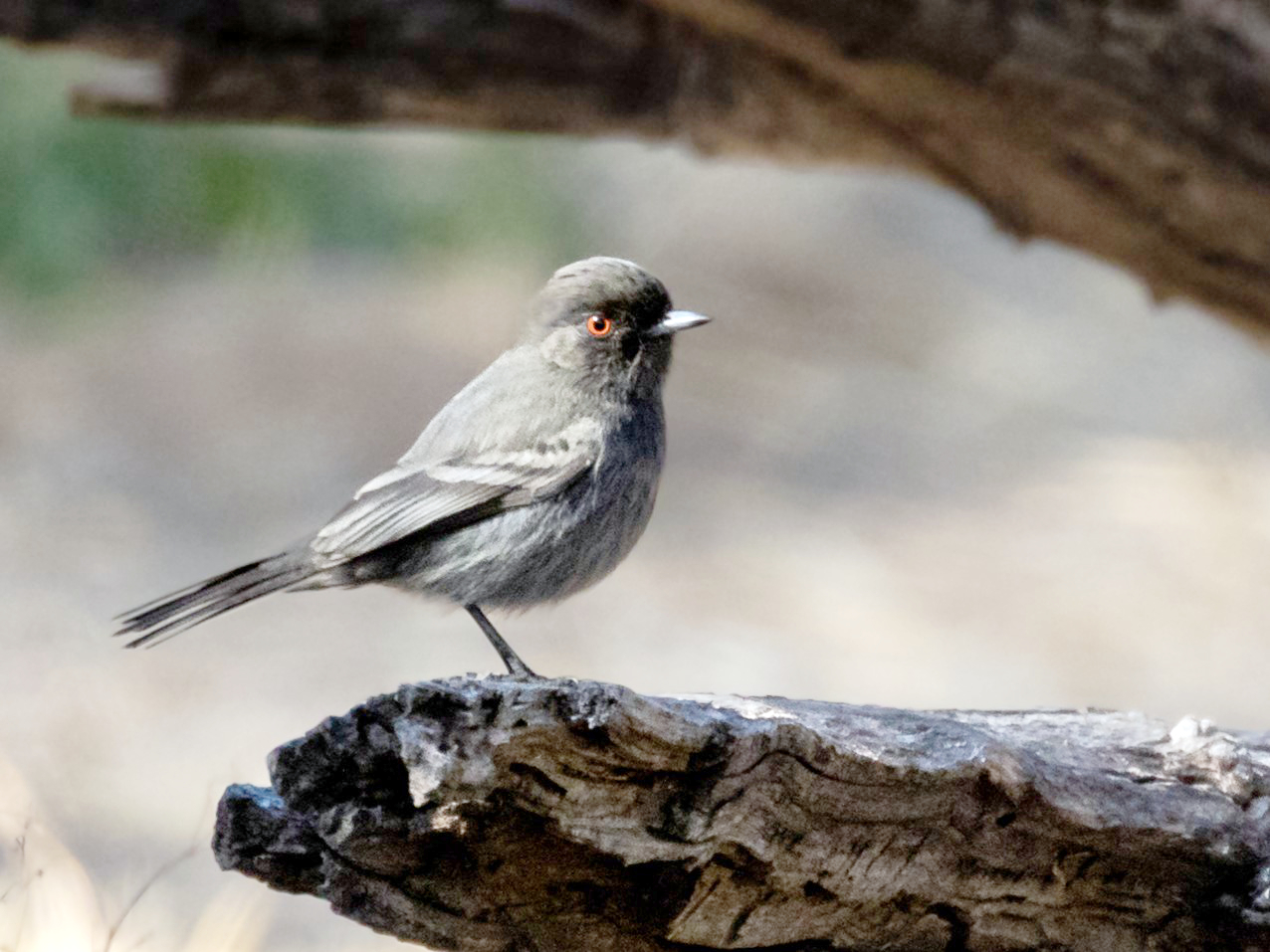
- Male

Conservation status
- Least Concern (IUCN 3.1)

Scientific classification
- Kingdom: Animalia
- Phylum: Chordata
- Class: Aves
- Order: Passeriformes
- Family: Tyrannidae
- Genus: Knipolegus
- Species: K. striaticeps

Binomial name
- Knipolegus striaticeps (d'Orbigny & Lafresnaye, 1837)

= Cinereous tyrant =

Species of bird

The cinereous tyrant, or cinereous black-tyrant, (Knipolegus striaticeps) is a species of bird in the family Tyrannidae, the tyrant flycatchers. It is found in Argentina, Bolivia, and Paraguay, and as a vagrant to Brazil.

== Taxonomy and systematics ==
The cinereous tyrant was formally described in 1837 as Muscisaxicola striaticeps. During the first two thirds of the twentieth century it was placed in the monotypic genus Entotriccus but by the 1980s it was placed in its current genus Knipolegus.

The cinereous tyrant is monotypic.

== Description ==
The cinereous tyrant is 13 to 13.5 cm (5.1 to 5.3 in) long. Adult males are shades of gray. ("Cinereous" means ash-colored.) They have mostly dark gray upperparts. Their head is darker than their body, giving the appearance of a hood, though the face is blackish gray. Their wings are dusky gray or blackish gray with grayish edges on the inner remiges and thin pale gray tips on the coverts that show as two wing bars. Their tail is dusky with pale outer webs on the outer feathers. Their throat and breast are a duskier gray than their back and their belly is grayish white or whitish with thin dusky streaks. Adult females have a mostly olive-brown head and upperparts with a rufous crown, whitish lores, dusky streaks on the nape, and rufous uppertail coverts. Their wings are olive-brown with white tips on the coverts that show as two wing bars. Their tail is olive-brown with rufous inner webs to the feathers. Their throat and breast are buff with thin gray streaks on the breast. Their belly is whitish. Males have a bright scarlet iris and females a pale brown iris. Both sexes have a black bill and black legs and feet.

== Distribution and habitat ==
The cinereous tyrant is found from eastern Bolivia's Santa Cruz Department south through western Paraguay into northwestern Argentina as far as western Córdoba and northern San Luis provinces. It has also occurred as a vagrant in extreme western Mato Grosso do Sul in southwestern Brazil. It inhabits the edges and openings of woodlands in the Gran Chaco. In elevation it mostly occurs below 1,000 m (3,300 ft) but locally reaches 1,900 m (6,200 ft).

== Behavior ==
=== Movement ===
The cinereous tyrant is apparently partially migratory, with some southern birds migrating north for the austral winter.

=== Feeding ===
The cinereous tyrant feeds on insects. It mostly forages singly and occasionally in pairs. It sits erect on an exposed perch and captures prey in mid-air with sallies from it ("hawking").

=== Breeding ===
The cinereous tyrant's breeding season has not been fully defined but includes at least November to February in Argentina. Males make a display flight from a perch up to about 15 m (50 ft) above the ground and drops with folded wings to a different perch. The species' nest is an open cup made from grass, horsehair, and feathers; some have been placed in a cactus. The clutch is two eggs. The incubation period, time to fledging, and details of parental care are not known.

=== Vocalization ===
The cinereous tyrant is mostly silent. Males give a "ts-ip" call before the display flight and during the drop makes a "skidi-ik: noise that might actually be from its wings. The latter is also written as "tikitip".

== Status ==
The IUCN has assessed the cinereous tyrant as being of Least Concern. It has a large range; its population size is not known and is believed to be stable. No immediate threats have been identified. It is considered fairly common to locally common. "Chaco woodland is increasingly being cleared for cattle grazing and agriculture, putting this species at some risk."
