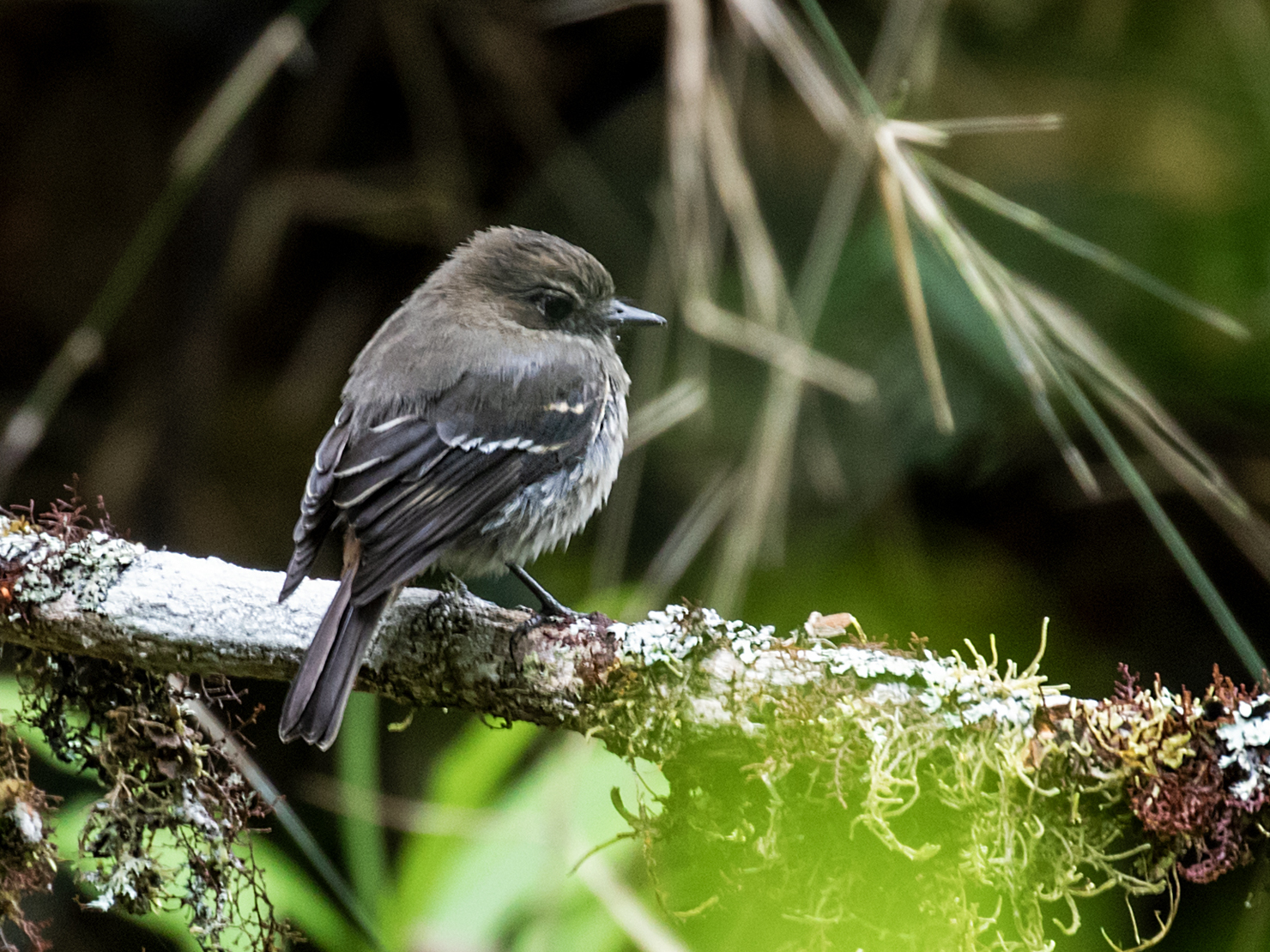
- Female

Conservation status
- Least Concern (IUCN 3.1)

Scientific classification
- Kingdom: Animalia
- Phylum: Chordata
- Class: Aves
- Order: Passeriformes
- Family: Tyrannidae
- Genus: Knipolegus
- Species: K. signatus

Binomial name
- Knipolegus signatus (Taczanowski, 1875)

Synonyms
- Ochthodiaeta signatus (protonym)

= Jelski's black tyrant =

Species of bird

Jelski's black tyrant, or Andean tyrant, (Knipolegus signatus) is a species of bird in the family Tyrannidae, the tyrant flycatchers. It is found in Ecuador and Peru.

== Taxonomy and systematics ==
Jelski's black tyrant has a complicated taxonomic history. It was formally described in 1875 as Ochthodiaeta signatus. Genus Ochthodiaeta was later merged into Myiotheretes. By the 1980s most authors had moved the species into Knipolegus. What is now the plumbeous tyrant (K. cabanisi) had been described as a species. By the 1980s the two were generally treated as conspecific though authors were beginning to suggest again treating them separately. The single species was called the Andean tyrant and plumbeous tyrant by different authors. Following a 2012 publication, in 2013 the South American Classification Committee of the American Ornithological Society split the two, calling signatus Jelski's black-tyrant and cabanisi the plumbeous tyrant. The IOC, BirdLife International's Handbook of the Birds of the World (HBW), and the Clements taxonomy followed suit beginning in 2014. However, as of early 2025 some confusion remains. The IOC, Clements, and the SACC all call signatus Jelski's black tyrant or black-tyrant. HBW calls it the Andean black-tyrant. The IOC calls cabanisi the plumbeous tyrant. Clements, the SACC, and HBW call it the plumbeous black-tyrant.

The four taxonomic systems agree that Jelski's black tyrant is monotypic.

== Description ==
Jelski's black tyrant is 14.5 to 16.5 cm (5.7 to 6.5 in) long. Adult males are entirely sooty black. Adult females have mostly dark olive-brown upperparts with more rufous uppertail coverts. Their wings are dark olive-brown with whitish to buff edges on the coverts that show as two wing bars. Their tail is dusky with thin cinnamon-rufous edges to the feathers. Their underparts are mostly heavily streaked with dark grayish olive and their undertail coverts are dark buffy. Both sexes have a dark red or chestnut iris, a blackish bill, and black legs and feet. Juveniles are similar to adult females but with a rusty wash on the upperparts, white wing bars, and paler yellow-tinged bars separating the dark one on the underparts.

== Distribution and habitat ==
Jelski's black tyrant has a disjunct distribution. It is found in the Cordillera del Cóndor straddling the border between southern Ecuador and northern Peru and separately in Peru from southern Amazonas Department south to Junín Department. It primarily inhabits the interior of humid montane forest and woodlands and less frequently the edges. It also occurs in thickets of alder (Alnus) and Podocarpus regrowing in disturbed areas. In elevation it ranges between 1,800 and 3,050 m (5,900 and 10,000 ft) but mostly occurs below 2,700 m (8,900 ft).

== Behavior ==
=== Movement ===
Jelski's black tyrant is a year-round resident.

=== Feeding ===
The diet and foraging behavior of Jelski's black tyrant are little known. It is believed to feed mostly on insects.

=== Breeding ===
Nothing is known about the breeding biology of Jelski's black tyrant.

=== Vocalization ===
As of May 2025 neither xeno-canto nor the Cornell Lab of Ornithology's Macaulay Library had any recordings of Jelski's black tyrant vocalizations.

== Status ==
The IUCN has assessed Jelski's black tyrant as being of Least Concern. It has a large range; its population size is not known and is believed to be decreasing. No immediate threats have been identified. It is barely known in the Cordillera del Cóndor, having been first recorded there in 2001. It is considered rare elsewhere in Peru.
