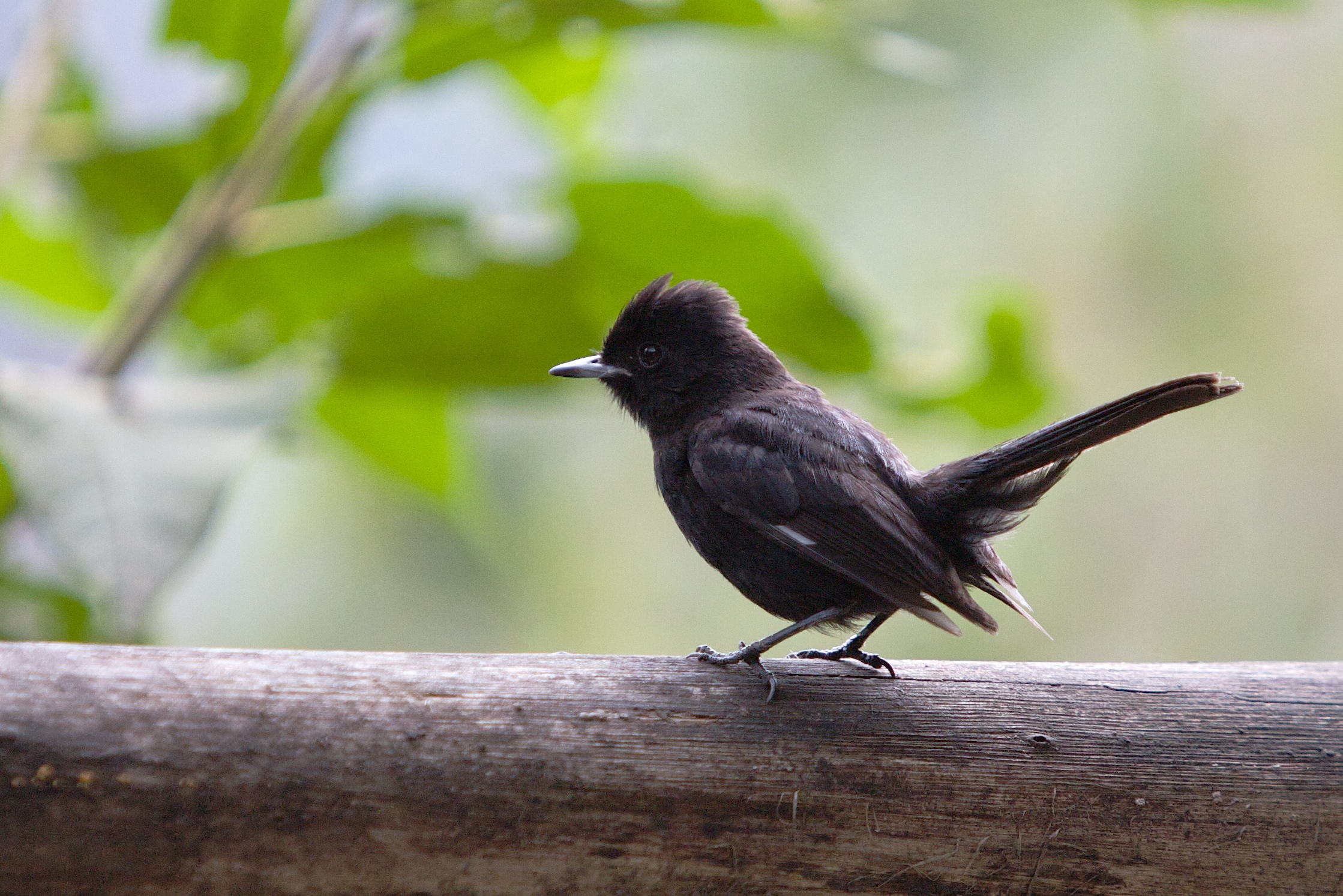
- Near Machu Picchu, Peru

Conservation status
- Least Concern (IUCN 3.1)

- Least Concern (IUCN 3.1)

Scientific classification
- Kingdom: Animalia
- Phylum: Chordata
- Class: Aves
- Order: Passeriformes
- Family: Tyrannidae
- Genus: Knipolegus
- Species: K. aterrimus

Binomial name
- Knipolegus aterrimus Kaup, 1853
- Range of K. a. aterrimus and K. a. anthracinus; that of K. a. heterogyna not shown. (See the taxonomy and status sections.)

= White-winged black tyrant =

Species of bird

The white-winged black tyrant (Knipolegus aterrimus) is a species of bird in the family Tyrannidae, the tyrant flycatchers. It is found in Argentina, Bolivia, Paraguay, Peru, and as a vagrant to Brazil and Chile.

== Taxonomy and systematics ==
The white-winged black tyrant was formally described in 1853 as Cnipolegus aterrimus. The genus' spelling was later changed to Knipolegus.

What is now Knipolegus franciscanus was long treated as a subspecies of K. aterrimus. By 2008 HBW had treated it as a full species. Following a 2012 publication that confirmed its status, other taxonomic systems followed suit, though they variously call it the Sao Francisco black tyrant and caatinga black-tyrant.

The white-winged black tyrant's further taxonomy is unsettled. The IOC and the Clements taxonomy assign it three subspecies, the nominate K. a. aterrimus (Kaup, 1853), K. a. anthracinus (Heine, 1860), and K. a. heterogyna (Berlepsch, 1907). BirdLife International's Handbook of the Birds of the World (HBW) recognizes heterogyna as a separate species, the white-rumped black-tyrant. Clements recognizes heterogyna as the "white-winged black-tyrant (white-rumped)" within the species.

This article follows the one species, three-subspecies model.

== Description ==
The white-winged black tyrant is 16 to 18 cm (6.3 to 7.1 in) long. Adult males of the nominate subspecies are almost entirely shiny black. Their wings have a wide white band on the inner webs of the primaries and secondaries that is very conspicuous in flight but usually hidden when perched. Adult females have a mostly grayish brown head and upperparts with a slightly darker crown, whitish mottling on the face and lores, and a bright cinnamon-rufous rump. Their wings are grayish brown with rufous or whitish edges on the remiges and whitish-buff or cinnamon-buff tips on the coverts that show as two wing bars. Their tail has a bright cinnamon-rufous base; the rest is dark brown with a still darker band across the end. Their underparts are mostly buffy ochraceous that is darkest on the breast and lighter on the throat and belly. Males of subspecies K. a. anthracinus are a duller black than the nominate. Females have less rufous on their tail than the nominate and dusky streaks on the breast. Males of K. a. heterogyna are identical to the nominate. Females have darker upperparts and paler underparts than the nominate. Their wing's markings are much whiter and their rump, uppertail coverts, and tail are a much paler buffy white. Both sexes of all subspecies have a dark brown iris and black legs and feet. Males have a blue-gray bill with a black tip; females have a black bill with a bluish base to the mandible.

== Distribution and habitat ==
The white-winged black tyrant has a disjunct distribution. Subspecies K. a. heterogyna is found separately from the other two, in Peru's Marañón River valley between the departments of Cajamarca and Ancash (not shown on map). Subspecies K. a. anthracinus is found from Junín Department in central Peru south and east into northwestern Bolivia's La Paz Department. The nominate subspecies is found from southern La Paz and Cochabamba departments in Bolivia south through western Paraguay and Argentina as far as Chubut Province. The species has also occurred as a vagrant in Brazil and Chile.

The white-winged black tyrant inhabits a variety of somewhat open arid and semi-arid landscapes. These include scrublands, woodlands, the edges of thicker forest, and secondary forest. In elevation it mostly ranges overall between 1,500 and 3,000 m (4,900 and 9,800 ft) but occasionally is found as low as 250 m (800 ft) and as high as 3,800 m (12,500 ft). In Peru it occurs between 1,800 and 3,600 m (5,900 and 11,800 ft).

== Behavior ==
=== Movement ===
The white-winged black tyrant is a partial migrant. Subspecies K. a. heterogyna and the northern populations of the other two subspecies are year-round residents. Southern populations move north in the austral winter to northeastern Argentina, western Paragiuy, and southern Bolivia.

=== Feeding ===
The white-winged black tyrant feeds on insects though details are lacking. It usually forages singly, perching erect in the open though sometimes in the canopy. It makes sallies from the perch to glean prey from foliage or to pounce on it on the ground.

=== Breeding ===
The white-winged black tyrant's breeding season has not been fully described but spans at least from October to February. Males make a display flight from a perch, pausing at the peak and dropping with open wings to the same or another perch. There are some differences in the display among the subspecies. The species' nest is an open cup made from twigs and lined with feathers and hair. It is usually placed low to the ground in a tree or bush and sometimes directly on the ground. The clutch is two to three eggs that are white with reddish marks on the large end. The incubation period, time to fledging, and details of parental care are not known.

=== Vocal and non-vocal sounds ===
At the peak of the flight display males make some clicks and buzzes, apparently with their bill and wings. Males sing during the display. Those of the northern population of the nominate subspecies begin with "a single low-pitched mechanical tok followed by two more closely spaced tok sounds, immediately proceeded by two high-pitched buzzy notes in quick succession, the first rising slightly and the second slightly downslurred". The song of the southern population is "an initial short, sharply rising note, followed by two low-pitched mechanical tok sounds, followed by two more buzzy vocal notes given quickly". Its most usual call is a "high-pitched...burry, noticeably downslurred Freer". Subspecies K. a. anthracinus sings a "thin, buzzy pi-dri'DZEER". Its calls are "quiet chatters and a single, descending dzeew".

== Status ==
The IUCN follows HBW taxonomy and so has assessed the "white-rumped" and "white-winged" black tyrants separately. The "white-rumped" (as Knipolegus heterogyna) has a restricted range of about 22,600 km^{2} (8,700 sq mi). The "white-winged" has a large range. Both are assessed as being of Least Concern; their population sizes are not known and are believed to be stable. No immediate threats to either have been identified. The species sensu lato is considered fairly common to common overall and uncommon to fairly common in Peru. It occurs in several protected areas. "Subspecies heterogyna has a particularly small range [in] an area well known to be suffering from severe habitat loss."
