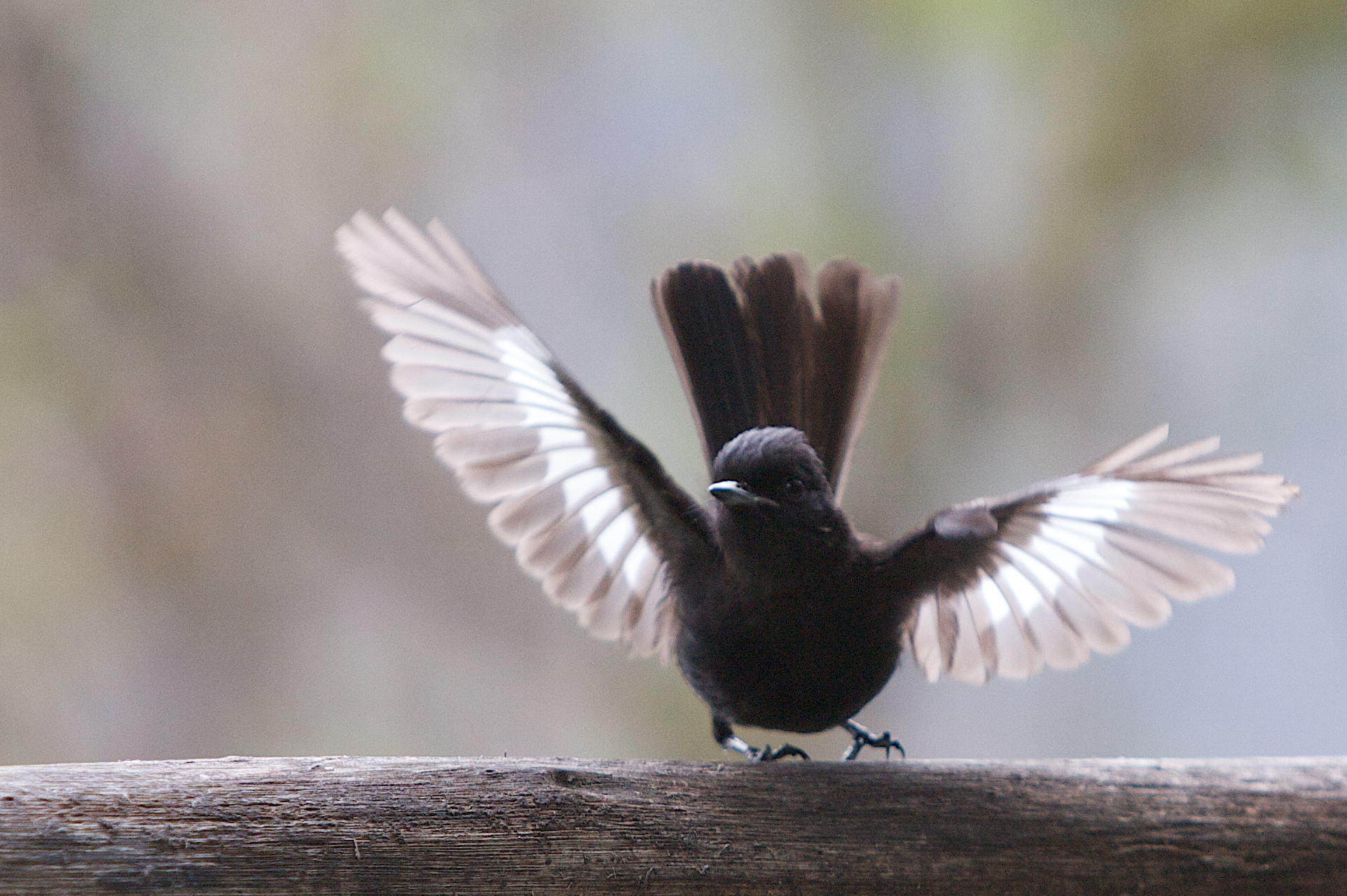
- White-winged black tyrant near Machu Picchu, Peru

Scientific classification
- Kingdom: Animalia
- Phylum: Chordata
- Class: Aves
- Order: Passeriformes
- Family: Tyrannidae
- Genus: Knipolegus; F. Boie, 1826

Type species
- Muscicapa cyanirostris Vieillot, 1818

= Knipolegus =

Genus of birds

Knipolegus is a genus of South American birds, the black tyrants, in the tyrant flycatcher family Tyrannidae.

The genus was erected by the German zoologist Friedrich Boie in 1826 with the blue-billed black tyrant as the type species. The genus name combines the Ancient Greek knips meaning "insect" and legō meaning "to pick".

== Species ==
The genus contains the following 12 species:

Image	Common name	Scientific name	Distribution
	Blue-billed black tyrant	Knipolegus cyanirostris	Argentina, Bolivia, Brazil, Paraguay, and Uruguay.
	Jelski's black tyrant	Knipolegus signatus	Peru
	Plumbeous tyrant	Knipolegus cabanisi	southeastern Peru, western Bolivia and northern Argentina.
	Cinereous tyrant	Knipolegus striaticeps	Bolivia, western Paraguay, northern Argentina
	White-winged black tyrant	Knipolegus aterrimus	Argentina, Bolivia, Chile, Paraguay, Peru, and Uruguay.
	Hudson's black tyrant	Knipolegus hudsoni	central Argentina and winters northwards, reaching Bolivia and Paraguay.
	Rufous-tailed tyrant	Knipolegus poecilurus	Bolivia, Brazil, Colombia, Ecuador, Guyana, Peru, and Venezuela.
	Riverside tyrant	Knipolegus orenocensis	Brazil, Colombia, Ecuador, Peru, and Venezuela.
	Amazonian black tyrant	Knipolegus poecilocercus	Brazil, Colombia, Ecuador, Guyana, Peru, and Venezuela.
	Crested black tyrant	Knipolegus lophotes	Brazil, Uruguay and northeastern Paraguay
	Velvety black tyrant	Knipolegus nigerrimus	Brazil
	Sao Francisco black tyrant or Caatinga black tyrant	Knipolegus franciscanus	Brazil.
