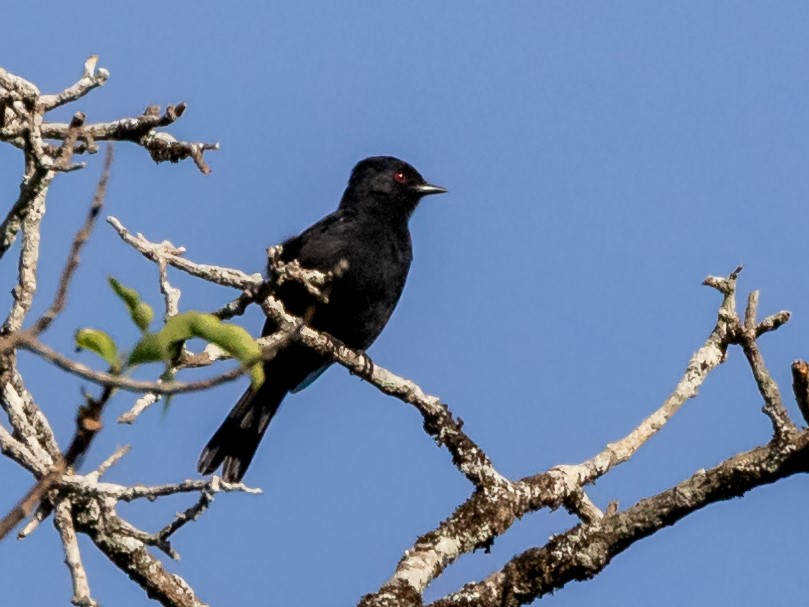
- Male
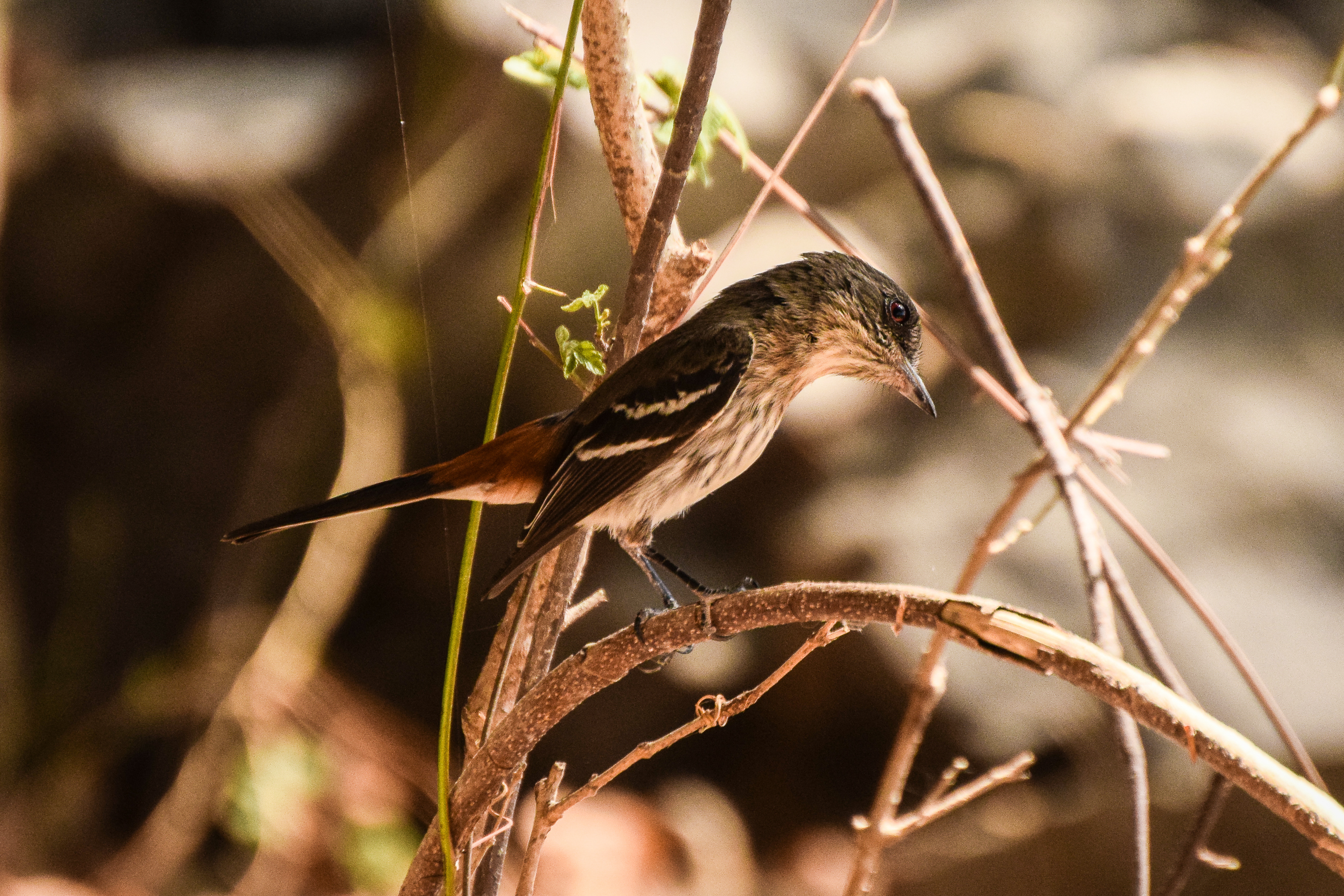
- Female

Conservation status
- Least Concern (IUCN 3.1)

Scientific classification
- Kingdom: Animalia
- Phylum: Chordata
- Class: Aves
- Order: Passeriformes
- Family: Tyrannidae
- Genus: Knipolegus
- Species: K. franciscanus

Binomial name
- Knipolegus franciscanus Snethlage, 1928

= São Francisco black tyrant =

Sao Francisco black tyrant

Species of bird

The Sao Francisco black tyrant (Knipolegus franciscanus), also known as the caatinga black tyrant or Brazilian black tyrant, is a species of bird in the family Tyrannidae, the tyrant flycatchers. It is endemic to Brazil.

== Taxonomy and systematics ==
The Sao Francisco black tyrant was formally described in 1928 as a subspecies of the white-winged black tyrant (K. aterrimus). By 2008 BirdLife International's Handbook of the Birds of the World (HBW) had treated it as a full species. Following a 2012 publication that confirmed its status, other taxonomic systems followed suit, variously calling it the Sao Francisco black tyrant and caatinga black-tyrant. (Note: The IOC, which is the Wikipedia standard for bird names, spells the English name Sao Francisco black tyrant with no diacritics. The other major taxonomic systems call the species the caatinga black-tyrant.)

The Sao Francisco black tyrant is monotypic.

== Description ==
The Sao Francisco black tyrant is 16 to 16.5 cm (6.3 to 6.5 in) long. One female weighed 20.5 g (0.72 oz). Adult males are almost entirely shiny black. Their wings have a wide white band at the base of the primaries that is conspicuous in flight but usually hidden when perched. Adult females have a mostly brownish gray head and upperparts with a rufous-buff rump, uppertail coverts, and base of the tail. The rest of their tail is dark. Their wings are brownish gray with whitish edges on the innermost remiges and pale tips on the coverts that show as two wing bars. Their underparts are mostly whitish with heavy dusky streaking and a buffish wash on the breast and undertail coverts. Both sexes have a blackish bill and dark gray or blue-gray legs and feet. Males have a red iris; the female's is orange-red.

== Distribution and habitat ==
The Sao Francisco black tyrant is found in east-central Brazil's São Francisco River basin. It has several discrete subpopulations in southwestern Bahia, northern and central Minas Gerais, southeastern Tocantins, northeastern Goiás, and the Federal District. It primarily inhabits caatinga scrublands and semi-deciduous dry forest. It greatly favors areas with outcrops of limestone or sandstone though it occasionally occurs some distance from them.

== Behavior ==
=== Movement ===
The Sao Francisco black tyrant is mostly a year-round resident though movement by some individuals away from its preferred habitat appear to be seasonal.

=== Feeding ===
The Sao Francisco black tyrant is assumed to feed mostly on insects though details are lacking. It usually forages singly or in pairs, though in the non-breeding season is sometimes joins mixed-species feeding flocks. It perches unobtrusively at any level of the forest but usually in the canopy or sub-canopy. It captures prey mostly with short sallies to glean it from leaves and branches and occasionally in mid-air "(hawking)". It will also drop to the ground to take prey.

=== Breeding ===
Nothing is known about the Sao Francisco black tyrant's breeding biology.

=== Vocalization ===
The Sao Francisco black tyrant's vocalizations are very poorly known. As of May 2025 xeno-canto had only two recordings of them; the Cornell Lab of Ornithology's Macaulay Library had one of those and five others. Males apparently give "very short and high-pitched notes".

== Status ==
The IUCN originally in 2004 assessed the Sao Francisco black tyrant as being of Least Concern, then in 2005 as Near Threatened, and since 2013 again as of Least Concern. It has a large overall range though its sub-populations are not contiguous. Its population size is not known and is believed to be decreasing. Mining and conversion of habitat to ranching and farming are the principal threats. "Limestone-derived soils are the most fertile in the region, so clearance for pasture and irrigated cultures has been widespread. The destruction of dry forest has been extensive since the early 1960s." It is considered "rather uncommon and local" though locally common and occurs in several protected areas.
