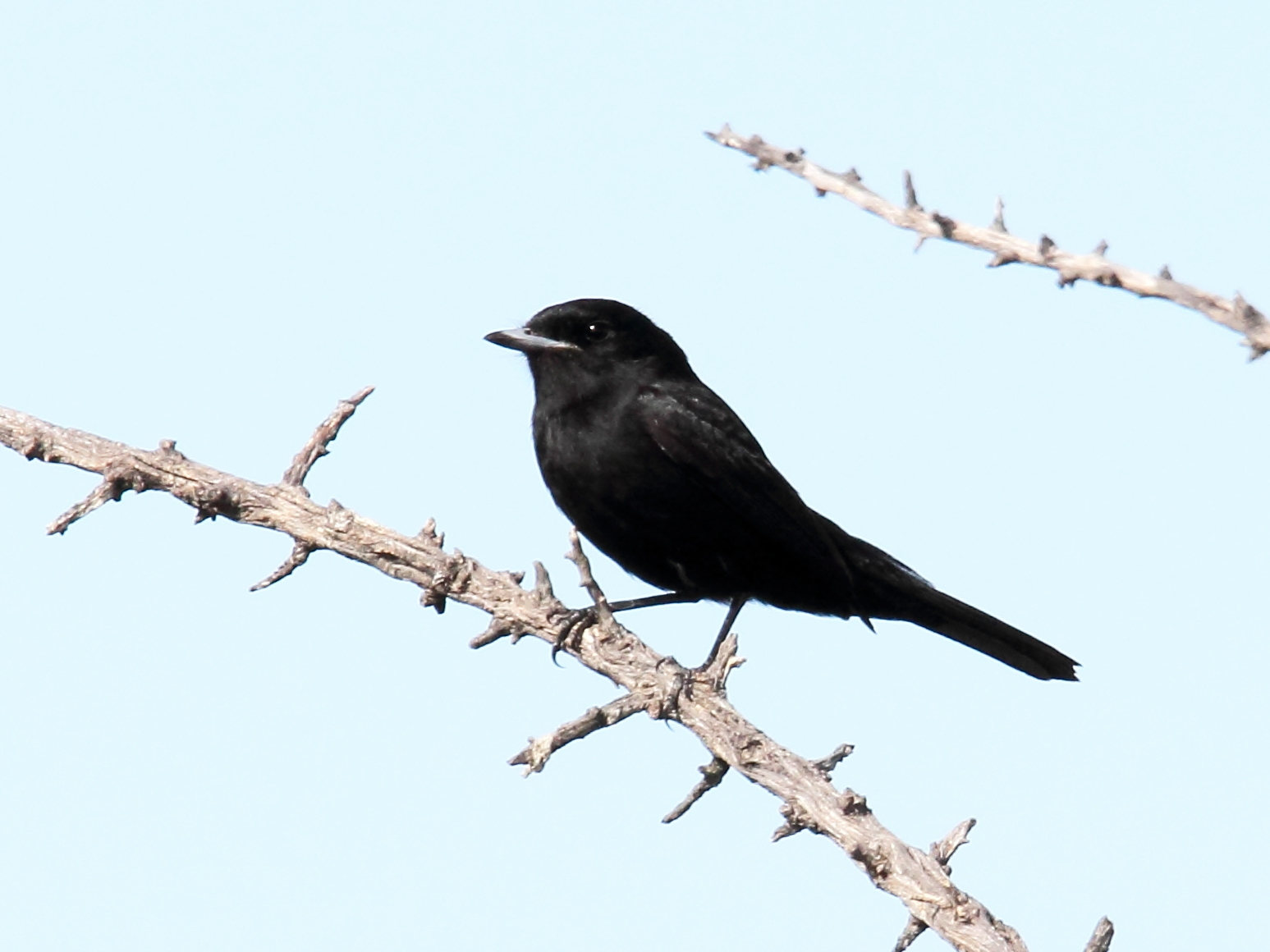

Conservation status
- Least Concern (IUCN 3.1)

Scientific classification
- Kingdom: Animalia
- Phylum: Chordata
- Class: Aves
- Order: Passeriformes
- Family: Tyrannidae
- Genus: Knipolegus
- Species: K. hudsoni

Binomial name
- Knipolegus hudsoni Sclater, PL, 1872
- Breeding Non-Breeding

= Hudson's black tyrant =

Species of bird

Hudson's black tyrant (Knipolegus hudsoni) is a species of bird in the family Tyrannidae, the tyrant flycatchers. It is found in Argentina, Bolivia, Paraguay, and as a vagrant to Brazil and Peru.

== Taxonomy and systematics ==
Hudson's black tyrant was formally described by Philip Sclater in 1872 as Cnipolegus hudsoni. Sclater gave it the specific epithet hudsoni to honor Argentine-British ornithologist William Henry Hudson, who collected the first four specimens. The genus' spelling was later changed to Knipolegus. For a time the species was moved to genus Phaeotriccus but a 2012 publication confirmed its return to Knipolegus.

Hudson's black tyrant is monotypic.

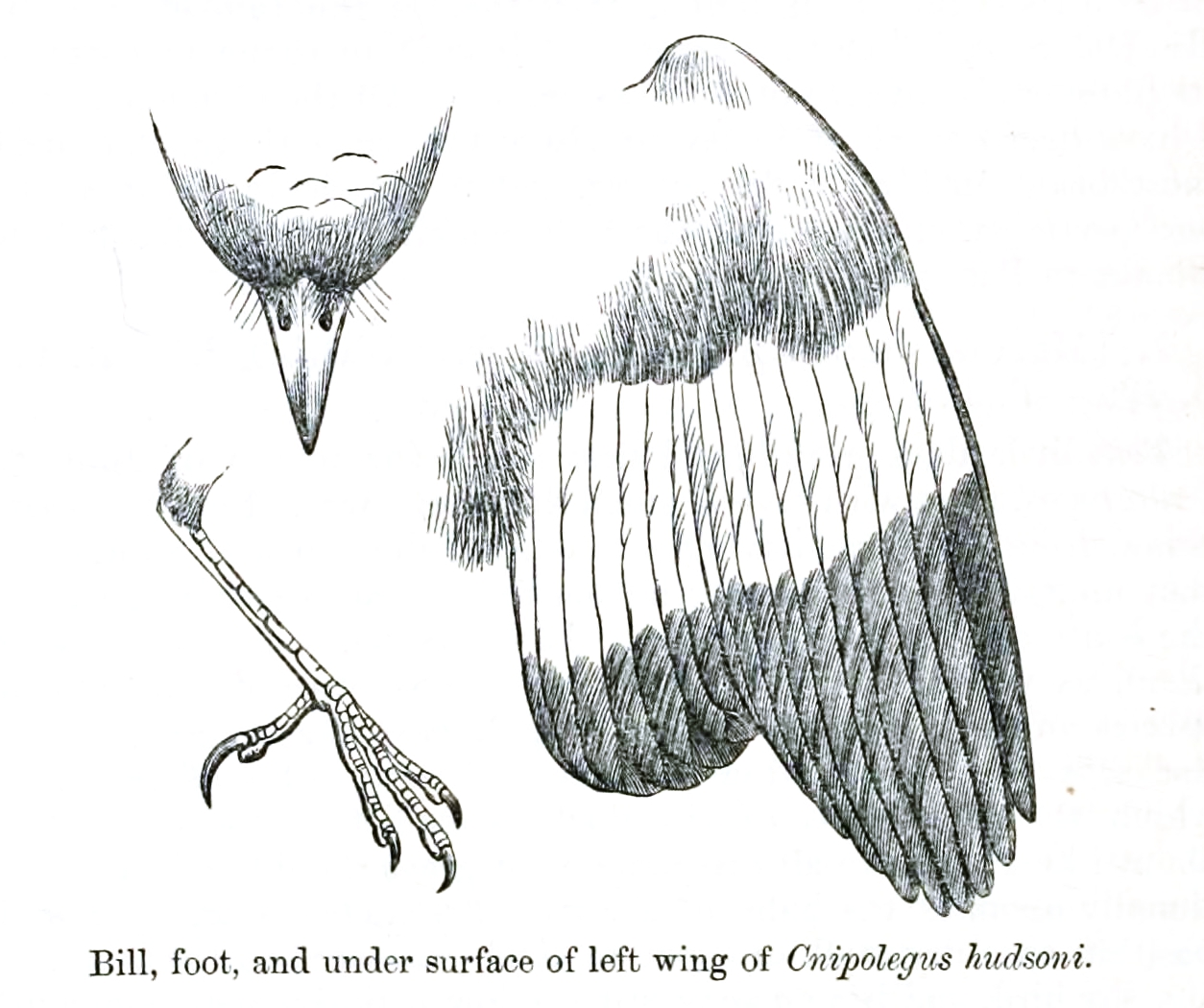
Illustration from the species' formal description

== Description ==
Hudson's black tyrant is about 15 to 15.5 cm (5.9 to 6.1 in) long. Adult males are almost entirely shiny black. Their wings have a wide white band on the inner webs of the primaries that is very conspicuous in flight but usually hidden when perched. They also has some whitish on the lower flanks. Adult females have a mostly grayish brown head and upperparts with a rufous rump and basal half of the tail. The rest of the tail is grayish brown with a blackish band across the end. Their wings are dusky with buff tips on the coverts that show as two wing bars. Their underparts are mostly buffy to ochre with dusky-olive streaks on the breast that extend more lightly onto the belly. Both sexes have a red iris, a blue-gray bill with a black tip, and black legs and feet.

== Distribution and habitat ==
Hudson's black tyrant is found from northern Bolivia south through western Paraguay into Argentina as far south as eastern Neuquén, northern Río Negro, and southwestern Buenos Aires provinces. It has also occurred as a vagrant in Brazil and Peru. The species inhabits somewhat open woodland and scrubland; in the north it also inhabits Gran Chaco woodlands, shrubby pastures, and gardens. In elevation it is found mostly below 500 m (1,600 ft).

== Behavior ==
=== Movement ===
Hudson's black tyrant is a complete migrant. It breeds from central Argentina south and moves north for the austral winter to northern Argentina, Paraguay, and Bolivia.

=== Feeding ===
Hudson's black tyrant feeds on insects. It usually forages in dense cover near the ground. Nothing else is known about its foraging behavior and diet.

=== Breeding ===
The breeding season of Hudson's black tyrant has not been defined. Males make a display in which they jump among the branches of a dead tree and sometimes flutter up from there. The species' nest is an open cup that is usually in a small tree or bush. Nothing else is known about its breeding biology.

=== Vocal and non-vocal sounds ===
Hudson's black tyrant makes an "[i]rregular ric-tic-titireetic and snapping sounds".

== Status ==
The IUCN has assessed Hudson's black tyrant as being of Least Concern. It has a large range; its population size is not known and is believed to be stable. No immediate threats have been identified. It is considered rare to locally uncommon though fairly common to common during the breeding season in south-central Argentina's Lihué Calel National Park.
