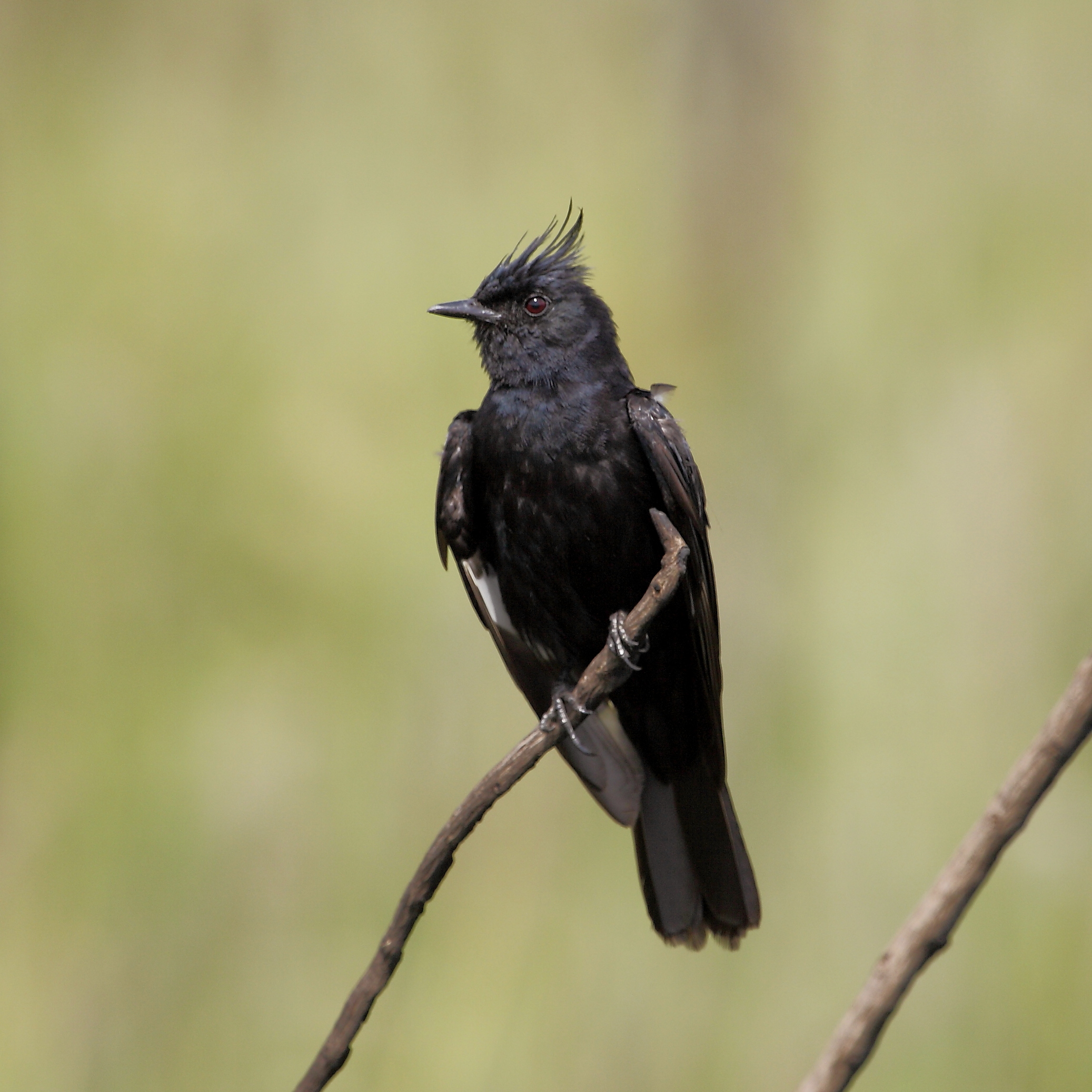

Conservation status
- Least Concern (IUCN 3.1)

Scientific classification
- Kingdom: Animalia
- Phylum: Chordata
- Class: Aves
- Order: Passeriformes
- Family: Tyrannidae
- Genus: Knipolegus
- Species: K. lophotes

Binomial name
- Knipolegus lophotes Boie, F, 1828

= Crested black tyrant =

Species of bird

The crested black tyrant (Knipolegus lophotes) is a species of bird in the family Tyrannidae, the tyrant flycatchers. It is found in Brazil, Paraguay, and Uruguay.

== Taxonomy and systematics ==
The crested black tyrant is monotypic.

== Description ==
The crested black tyrant is 20 to 21 cm (7.9 to 8.3 in) long. Unique in its genus, it has a long thin crest. The sexes have the same plumage; males are slightly larger than females. Adults are almost entirely glossy blue-black. Their remiges have white bases that are conspicuous in flight but usually not visible at rest. Both sexes have a dark red or reddish-brown iris, a black bill, and black legs and feet.

The crested black tyrant and the phainopepla (Phainopepla nitens), a member of the silky-flycatcher family Ptiliogonatidae, are almost alike in appearance. Often such a close resemblance is a result of competitive mimicry. They inhabit similar landscapes, however their ranges are more than 4,000 km (2,500 mi) apart so mimicry cannot be the reason.

== Distribution and habitat ==
The crested black tyrant is found in Brazil from southern Bahia south to Rio Grande do Sul and west to southern Mato Grosso and its range continues into northern and eastern Uruguay. There is a small separate population in Amambay Department in eastern Paraguay. The species inhabits shrubby cerrado grasslands and pastures, usually those with some stands of trees. In elevation it ranges from near sea level to 1,100 m (3,600 ft).

== Behavior ==
=== Movement ===
The crested black tyrant is a year-round resident.

=== Feeding ===
The crested black tyrant feeds mostly on insects and occasionally includes small fruits in its diet. It usually forages in pairs, though not close to each other. It captures prey with sallies from a perch.

=== Breeding ===
The crested black tyrant's breeding season has not been fully defined but appears to span at least September to November. Its only known nest was an open cup made from twigs, roots, and lichens. It was on a rock ledge about 3.5 m (10 ft) above the ground; the site was damp, shady, and hidden. Nothing else is known about the species' breeding biology.

=== Vocalization ===
As of April 2025 xeno-canto and the Cornell Lab of Ornithology's Macaulay Library each had nine recordings of crested black tyrant vocalizations; one of them was in both. The species is usually silent, but its flight song is a "very high téetwee-twee-twee (middle twee lowest pitched)".

== Status ==
The IUCN has assessed the crested black tyrant as being of Least Concern. It has a large range; its population size is not known and is believed to be stable. No immediate threats have been identified. It is poorly known and appears to be uncommon to fairly common. It occurs in several national parks and preserves in Brazil.
