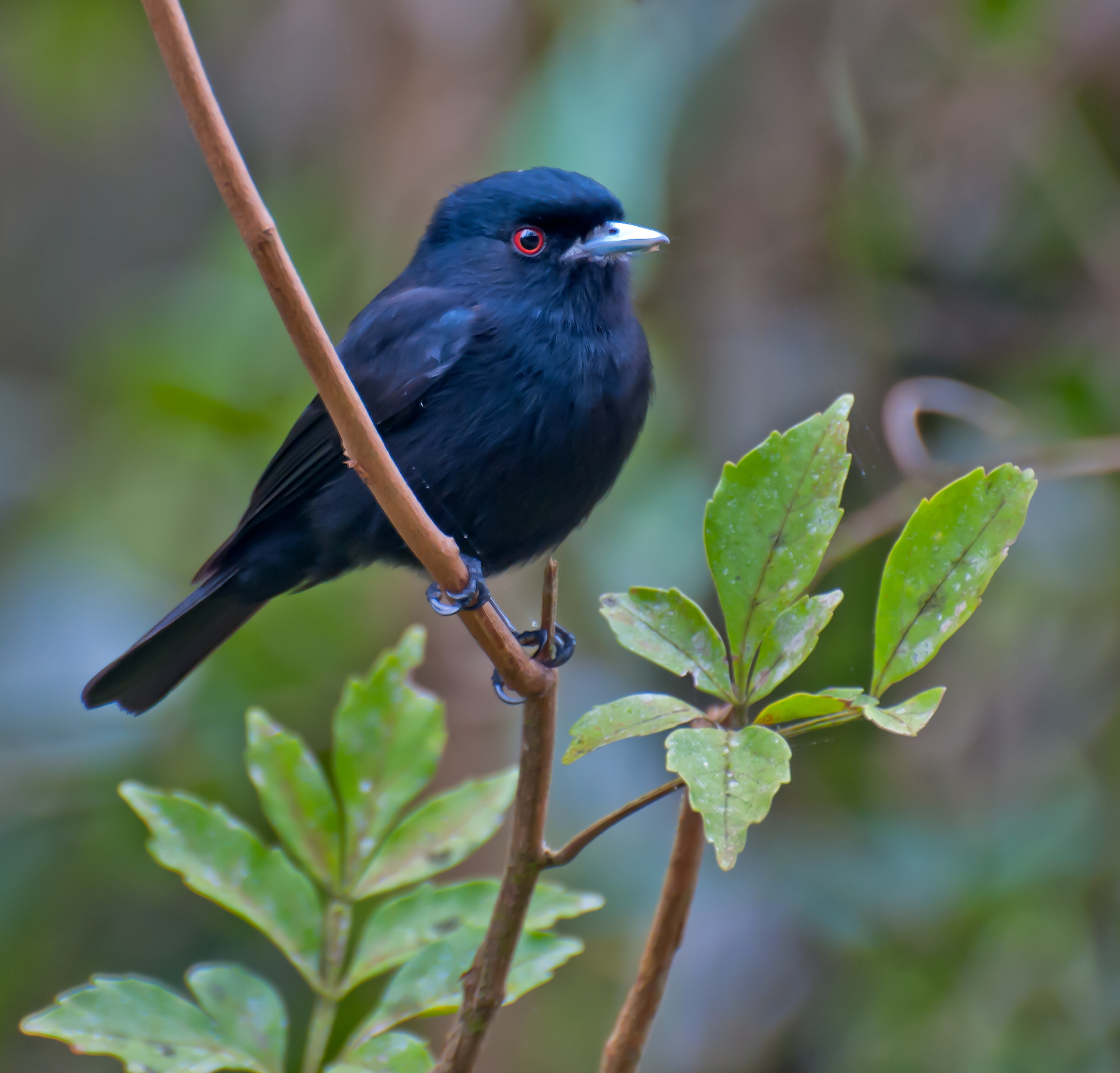
- Male in São Paulo, Brazil
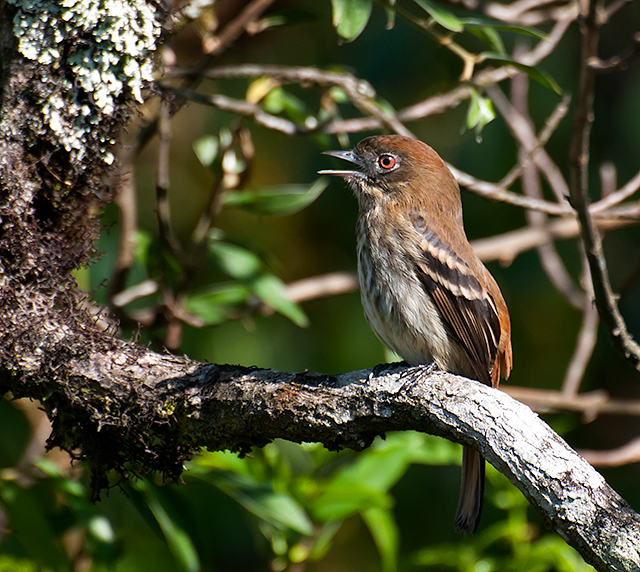
- Female in Minas Gerais, Brazil

Conservation status
- Least Concern (IUCN 3.1)

Scientific classification
- Kingdom: Animalia
- Phylum: Chordata
- Class: Aves
- Order: Passeriformes
- Family: Tyrannidae
- Genus: Knipolegus
- Species: K. cyanirostris

Binomial name
- Knipolegus cyanirostris (Vieillot, 1818)
- Year-round Non-Breeding

= Blue-billed black tyrant =

Species of bird

The blue-billed black tyrant (Knipolegus cyanirostris) is a species of bird in the family Tyrannidae, the tyrant flycatchers. It is found in Argentina, Brazil, Paraguay, and Uruguay.

== Taxonomy and systematics ==
The blue-billed black tyrant was formally described in 1818 as Muscicapa cyanirostris, placing it in the Old World flycatcher family. It was later transferred to genus Knipolegus, which was erected in 1826 with it as the type species.

The blue-billed black tyrant is monotypic.

== Description ==
The blue-billed black tyrant is 14.5 to 15 cm (5.7 to 5.9 in) long. Adult males are almost entirely glossy black but for faint white edges on the underside of their remiges. Adult females have mostly rufous-brown upperparts. Their crown is a brighter rufous, their rump rufous, and their tail coverts bright cinnamon. Their wings are blackish with buff to cinnamon edges on the coverts that show as two wing bars. Their tail is dusky with rufous edges to the feathers. Their underparts are mostly whitish to yellowish white with heavy blackish brown streaks and their crissum is cinnamon-rufous. Males have a bright red iris, a pale blue bill with a black tip, and black legs and feet. Females have a pale red to orange iris, a blackish bill with usually a bluish mandible, and black legs and feet.

== Distribution and habitat ==
The blue-billed black tyrant is found from Mato Grosso do Sul, Minas Gerais, and Espírito Santo in southern Brazil south through Uruguay and eastern Paraguay into Argentina to northern Buenos Aires Province. It primarily inhabits the edges of humid forest and gallery forest and shuns their interiors. Less often it also occurs into semi-open scrublands near forest. In elevation it ranges from sea level to 2,200 m (7,200 ft).

== Behavior ==
=== Movement ===
The blue-billed black tyrant is a partial migrant. Most of the southern population moves north for the austral winter into far northern Argentina, Mato Grosso do Sul, and eastern Paraguay. It does not breed in those areas.

=== Feeding ===
The blue-billed black tyrant feeds on insects. It usually forages in pairs, perching low in the forest and taking prey by gleaning while perched and with short sallies to take it in mid-air ("hawking").

=== Breeding ===
The blue-billed black tyrant breeds in November and December in Argentina; its season further north is not known. Males make a short flight display, looping from a perch in front of a female with wings raised on the descent. Its nest is an open cup made from small sticks and grass lined with softer plant fibers and feathers. It is typically placed on a tree branch. The clutch is one to three eggs. The incubation period, time to fledging, and details of parental care are not known. Nest parasitism by shiny cowbirds (Molothrus bonariensis) has been observed.

=== Vocalization ===
The blue-billed black tyrant is not highly vocal. Its call is an "extr. high, staccato whic".

== Status ==
The IUCN has assessed the blue-billed black tyrant as being of Least Concern. It has a large range; its population size is not known and is believed to be decreasing. No immediate threats have been identified. It is considered uncommon to locally common or locally abundant. It occurs in many protected areas in Brazil and at least one in Argentina.
