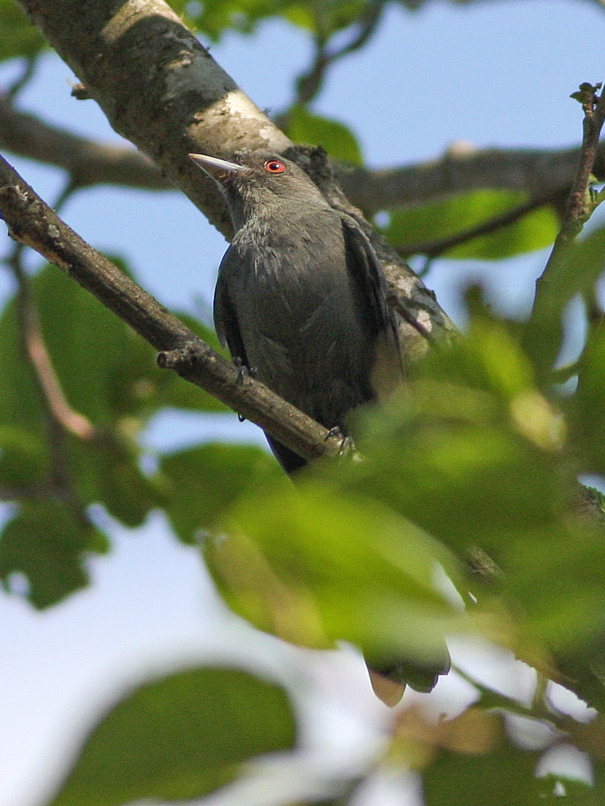

Conservation status
- Least Concern (IUCN 3.1)

Scientific classification
- Kingdom: Animalia
- Phylum: Chordata
- Class: Aves
- Order: Passeriformes
- Family: Tyrannidae
- Genus: Knipolegus
- Species: K. cabanisi

Binomial name
- Knipolegus cabanisi Schulz, 1882

= Plumbeous tyrant =

Plumbeous Black-Tyrant

Species of bird

The plumbeous tyrant (Knipolegus cabanisi) is a species of bird in the family Tyrannidae, the tyrant flycatchers. It is found in Argentina, Bolivia, and Peru.

== Taxonomy and systematics ==
The plumbeous tyrant has a complicated taxonomic history. It was formally described in 1882 as Cnipolegus cabanisi. The genus was later spelled Knipolegus. By the 1980s it was widely treated as a subspecies of Knipolegus signatus, which was called by different authors the Andean tyrant and plumbeous tyrant. Following a 2012 publication, in 2013 the South American Classification Committee of the American Ornithological Society split the two, calling signatus Jelski's black-tyrant and cabanisi the plumbeous tyrant. The IOC, BirdLife International's Handbook of the Birds of the World (HBW), and the Clements taxonomy followed suit beginning in 2014. However, as of early 2025 some confusion remains. The IOC calls cabanisi the plumbeous tyrant. Clements, the SACC, and HBW call it the plumbeous black-tyrant.

The four taxonomic systems agree that the plumbeous (black-) tyrant is monotypic.

== Description ==
The plumbeous tyrant is 14.5 to 16.5 cm (5.7 to 6.5 in) long. Adult males are almost entirely dark slate gray above and somewhat paler below with lower belly the palest. Their wings and tail are dusky with white edges on the inner webs of the remiges. Adult females have mostly dull brown upperparts with bright rufous uppertail coverts. Their wings are dull brown with buffy white edges on the coverts that show as two wing bars. Their tail is dull brown with bright rufous edges to the feathers. Their underparts are buffy white with wide grayish olive streaks that sometimes cover the breast. Males have an orange to red iris, a blue-gray to bluish ivory bill, and dark brown to dark gray legs and feet. Females have a brown to orange iris, a blackish or black-tipped gray bill, and black legs and feet.

== Distribution and habitat ==
The plumbeous tyrant is found in the Andes from eastern Cuzco and northern Puno departments in southern Peru south through Bolivia into northwestern Argentina as far as southeastern Catamarca Province. It primarily inhabits the interior of humid montane forest and woodlands and less frequently the edges. It also occurs in thickets of alder (Alnus) and Podocarpus regrowing in disturbed areas. In elevation it ranges between 700 and 2,700 m (2,300 and 8,900 ft) but occurs only above 1,800 m (5,900 ft) in Peru.

== Behavior ==
=== Movement ===
The plumbeous tyrant is a year-round resident.

=== Feeding ===
The diet and foraging behavior of the plumbeous tyrant are little known. It feeds mostly on insects. It usually forages singly and does not join mixed-species feeding flocks.

=== Breeding ===
The plumbeous tyrant's breeding season has not been fully defined but appears to span at least October to February. Males make a display flight, whirring its wings while ascending to about 10 m (35 ft) above the ground, gliding at the peak, and dropping with closed wings to a perch. The species' nest is an open cup made from grass and moss and lined with feathers. It is typically placed on a horizontal branch up to about 4 m (13 ft) above the ground. The clutch is one to three eggs that are white with chestnut marks at the larger end. The incubation period, time to fledging, and details of parental care are not known. Nest parasitism by shiny cowbirds (Molothrus bonariensis) has been observed.

=== Vocalization ===
As of April 2025 xeno-canto had five recordings of plumbeous tyrant vocalizations; the Cornell Lab of Ornithology's Macaulay Library had one of them and three others. The species is mostly silent. At the peak of the display flight males utter "a rich tchick!". The species' call is "a rapid, low chirri'jurriew" that is accompanied by bill snapping.

== Status ==
The IUCN has assessed the plumbeous tyrant as being of Least Concern. It has a large range; its population size is not known and is believed to be decreasing. No immediate threats have been identified. It is rare in Peru and fairly common in Argentina and at least parts of Bolivia. It occurs in national parks in all three countries within its range.
