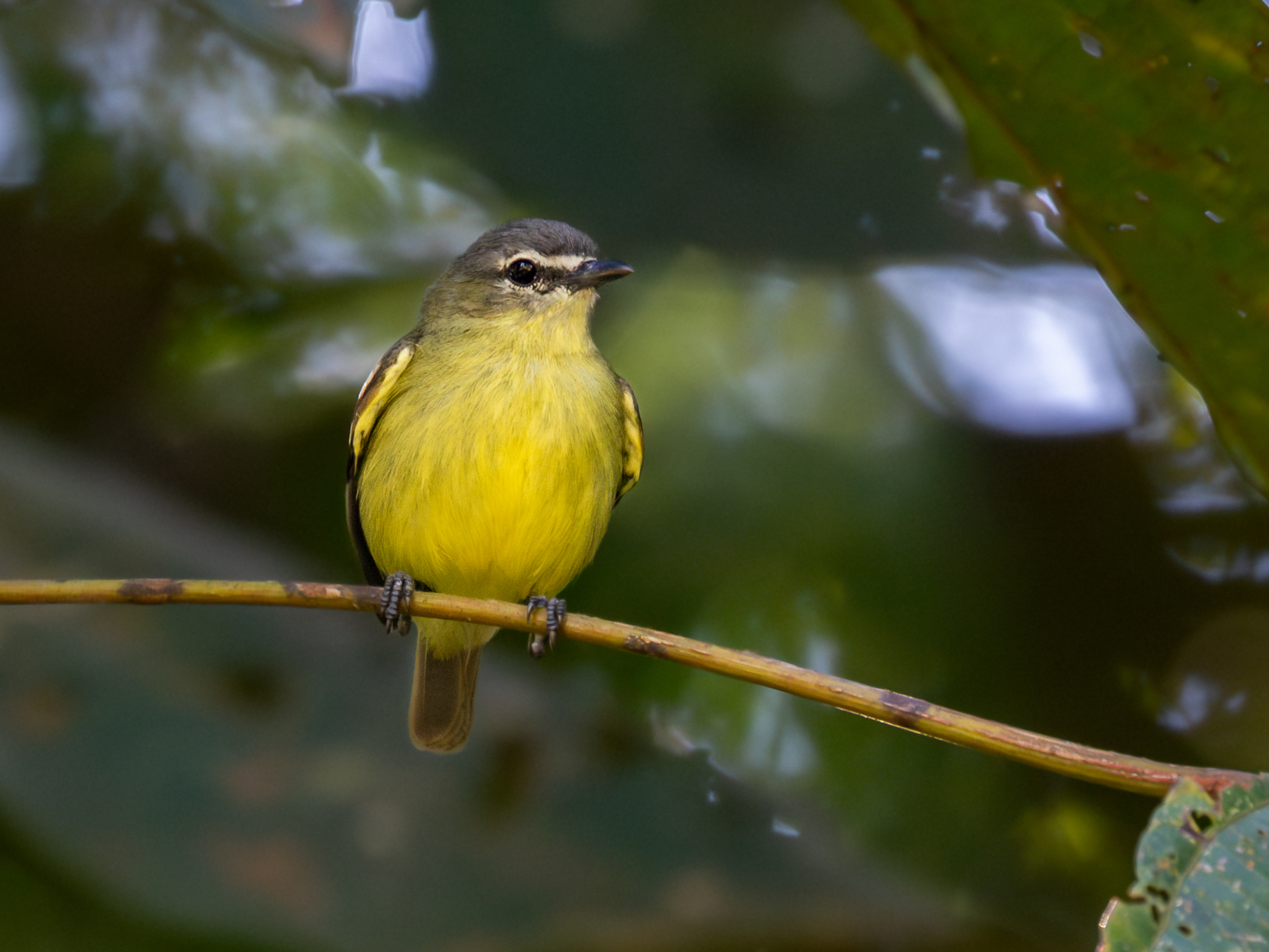
- White-lored tyrannulet at Porto Velho, Rondônia, Brazil

Conservation status
- Least Concern (IUCN 3.1)

Scientific classification
- Kingdom: Animalia
- Phylum: Chordata
- Class: Aves
- Order: Passeriformes
- Family: Tyrannidae
- Genus: Ornithion
- Species: O. inerme

Binomial name
- Ornithion inerme Hartlaub, 1853

= White-lored tyrannulet =

Species of bird

The white-lored tyrannulet (Ornithion inerme) is a species of bird in subfamily Elaeniinae of family Tyrannidae, the tyrant flycatchers. It is found in Bolivia, Brazil, Colombia, Ecuador, French Guiana, Guyana, Peru, Suriname, and Venezuela.

== Taxonomy and systematics ==
The white-lored tyrannulet is monotypic.

== Description ==
The white-lored tyrannulet is 8 to 9 cm (3.1 to 3.5 in) long and weighs about 6 to 8 g (0.21 to 0.28 oz). It is a small flycatcher with a rather thick bill. The sexes have the same plumage. Adults have a gray crown and nape with a white line from past the eye to past the eye across the forehead and gray lores on an otherwise olive face. Their upperparts are olive. Their wings are blackish with thin greenish yellow edges on the secondaries. Their greater and median wing coverts have pale yellow tips that show as two rows of spots on the closed wing. Their tail is grayish with green edges on the outer feathers. Their throat is whitish and the rest of their underparts mostly pale yellow with a light olivaceous wash on the breast and sides. Both sexes have a dark brown iris, a black bill, and dark gray or black legs and feet. Juveniles have ochraceous wing bars and are otherwise like adults.

== Distribution and habitat ==
The white-lored tyrannulet has a disjunct distribution. By far the larger of its two ranges encompasses almost the entire Amazon Basin. It stretches from the base of the Andes of Colombia, Ecuador, Peru and Bolivia east through southern and eastern Venezuela, the Guianas, and almost the entire northern half of Brazil. The species is also found along the southeastern Brazilian coast from Alagoas and Bahia south to Rio de Janeiro state. The white-lored tyrannulet inhabits tropical lowland evergreen forest. It favors the canopy but apparently is more abundant at edges such as along watercourses, lakes, and openings caused by fallen trees. In Colombia it often occurs in terra firme forest and in Brazil in várzea forest. In elevation it ranges from sea level to 1,000 m (3,300 ft) in Brazil, to 500 m (1,600 ft) in Colombia, 600 m (2,000 ft) in Ecuador, 1,000 m (3,300 ft) in Peru, and 950 m (3,100 ft) in Venezuela.

== Behavior ==
=== Movement ===
The white-lored tyrannulet is a year-round resident throughout its range.

=== Feeding ===
The white-lored tyrannulet's behavior is much like that of a vireo (Vireonidae). It feeds almost exclusively on arthropods though details are lacking. It usually forages singly or in pairs in the forest canopy and often joins mixed-species feeding flocks. It takes prey by gleaning from leaves, twigs, and stems while perched, sometimes hanging to reach them. It also feeds by short upward flutter flights and by briefly hovering.

=== Breeding ===
The white-lored tyrannulet's breeding biology is almost completely unknown. The only data point to its breeding season including December in Peru.

=== Vocalization ===
Many authors note that the white-lored tyrannulet is highly vocal and is heard more often than seen. Its song is described as a "persistently repeated, rather high-pitched and wheezy pee, dee-dee-deet or pee, dee-deet", "a series of thin, rising whistles (usually 3–4): weet-weet-weet?", and "a high, metallic, and ringing sree-de-de-de; when excited a faster, longer swee'di-di-di-di-d'd'd'd'd'd'ddd, ending in [a] metallic accelerating trill that attenuates somewhat".

== Status ==
The IUCN has assessed the white-lored tyrannulet as being of Least Concern. It has an extremely large range; its population size is not known and is believed to be decreasing. No immediate threats have been identified. It is considered fairly common in Colombia, uncommon to locally fairly common in Ecuador, and fairly common in Peru and Venezuela. "Human activity has little short-term direct effect on White-lored Tyrannulet, other than the local effects of habitat destruction."
