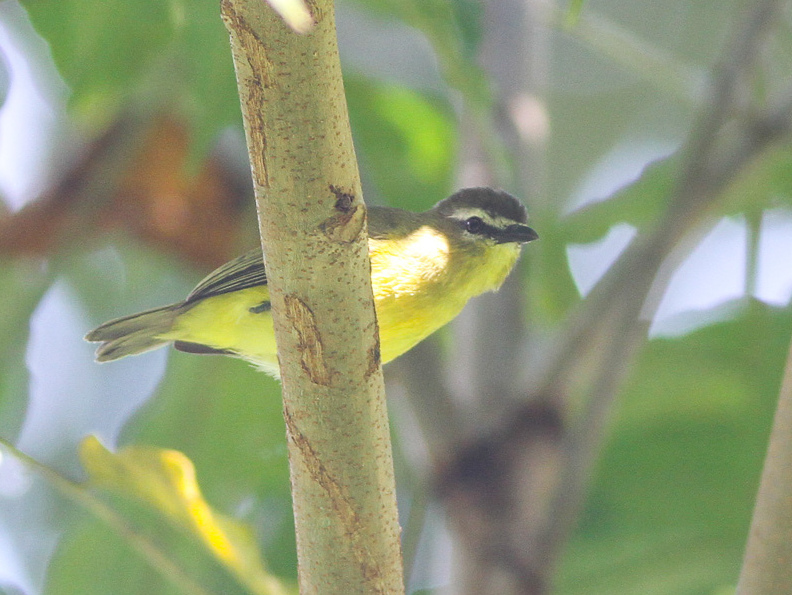

Conservation status
- Least Concern (IUCN 3.1)

Scientific classification
- Kingdom: Animalia
- Phylum: Chordata
- Class: Aves
- Order: Passeriformes
- Family: Tyrannidae
- Genus: Ornithion
- Species: O. brunneicapillus

Binomial name
- Ornithion brunneicapillus (Lawrence, 1862)

= Brown-capped tyrannulet =

Species of bird

The brown-capped tyrannulet (Ornithion brunneicapillus) is a species of bird in subfamily Elaeniinae of family Tyrannidae, the tyrant flycatchers. It is found in Colombia, Costa Rica, Ecuador, Panama, and Venezuela and reported for the first time in Nicaragua in 2011.

== Taxonomy and systematics ==
The brown-capped tyrannulet and the yellow-bellied tyrannulet (O. semiflavum) were for a time considered to be conspecific and now are deemed a superspecies. Both are now monotypic.

== Description ==
The brown-capped tyrannulet is about 8 cm (3.1 in) long and weighs about 7 to 8 g (0.25 to 0.28 oz). It is a small flycatcher with a pointed bill. The sexes have the same plumage. Adults have a brownish olive to dark brown crown with a white forehead, lores, and supercilium on an otherwise olive face. Their upperparts are olive. Their wings and tail are dusky olive. Their underparts are bright yellow with faint olive streaks on the breast and flanks. Both sexes have a brown iris, a black bill with an arched maxilla, and dark gray legs and feet. Juveniles have a more olive crown, a less distinct supercilium, paler tips on the wing coverts, and paler yellow underparts than adults.

== Distribution and habitat ==
The brown-capped tyrannulet is found in far southern Nicaragua, along the Caribbean slope of Costa Rica and to central Panama, on both the Caribbean and Pacific slopes from central Panama to Colombia, then south on the Pacific slope through Colombia and to Ecuador's El Oro Province. It also occurs locally from northeastern Colombia into northwestern Venezuela and separately in northern Venezuela. The species inhabits the tropical and lower subtropical zones, primarily in the interior and edges of humid evergreen forest, mature secondary forest, semi-open woodlands, and coffee plantations. In elevation it ranges from sea level to 900 m (3,000 ft) in Costa Rica, to 750 m (2,500 ft) in Panama, to 1,300 m (4,300 ft) in Colombia, to 400 m (1,300 ft) in Ecuador, and to 1,200 m (3,900 ft) in Venezuela.

== Behavior ==
=== Movement ===
The brown-capped tyrannulet is a year-round resident throughout its range.

=== Feeding ===
The brown-capped tyrannulet's behavior is much like that of a warbler (Parulidae) or vireo (Vireonidae). It feeds almost exclusively on arthropods. It usually forages singly or in pairs, and from the forest's mid-level to the canopy but lower on its edges. It often joins mixed-species feeding flocks. It takes most prey by gleaning from leaves, twigs, and stems while perched.

=== Breeding ===
The brown-capped tyrannulet breeds between January and August. Its nest is "an untidy flat saucer" made from twigs, leaf petioles, and bark, and typically in a branch fork between about 3.5 and 12 m (10 and 40 ft) above the ground. Nothing else is known about the species' breeding biology.

=== Vocalization ===
The brown-capped tyrannulet's primary vocalization is a "[s]eries of 4–6 high metallic or piping whistles, each slightly downward-slurred, slight pause after first note, 'pee, pey-pey-pew' ". It also makes a "single high-pitched 'peeep' ".

== Status ==
The IUCN has assessed the brown-capped tyrannulet as being of Least Concern. It has a large range; its estimated population of at least 500,000 mature individuals is believed to be decreasing. No immediate threats have been identified. It is considered uncommon to fairly common across its range and occurs in several protected areas.
