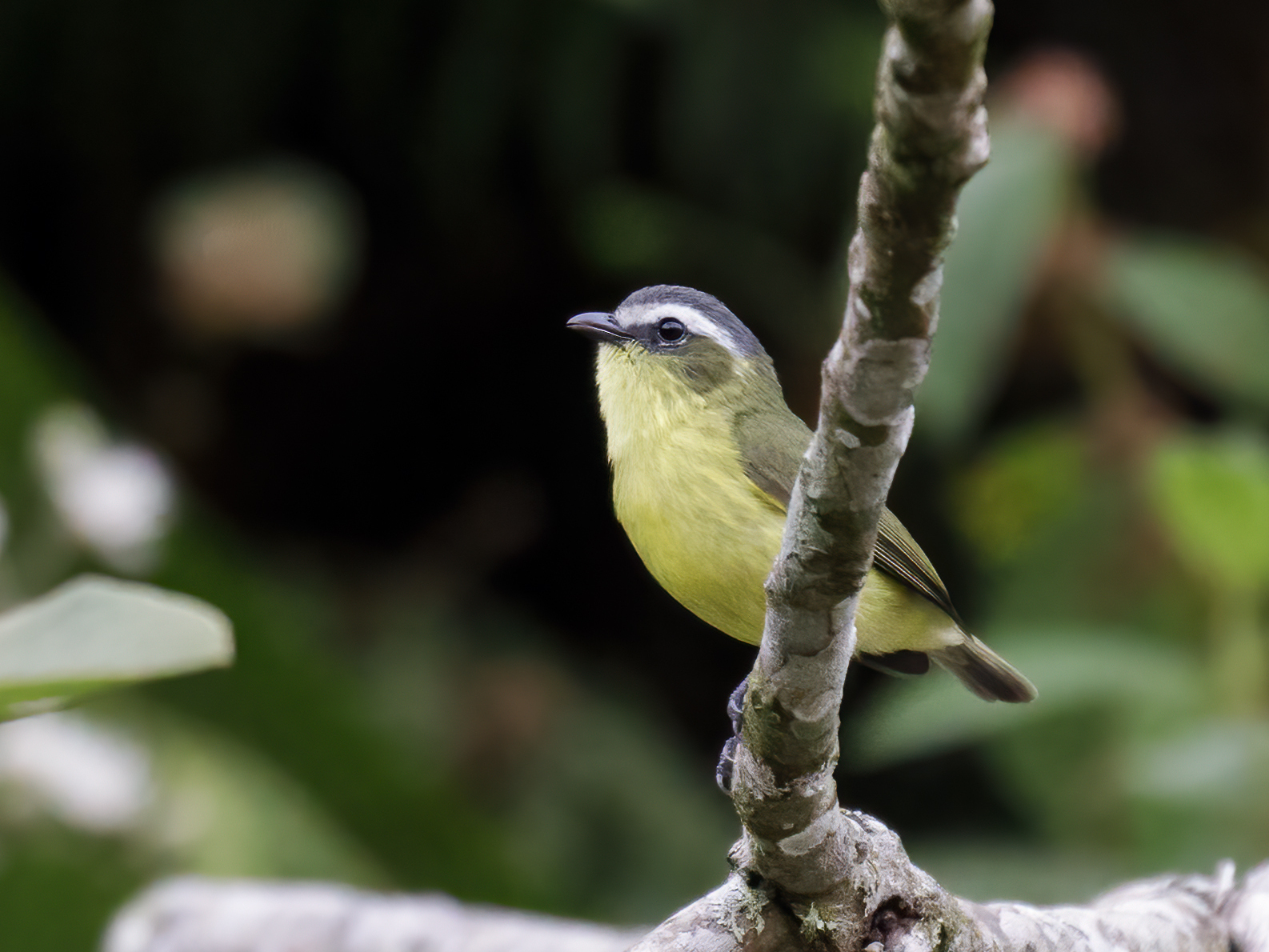

Conservation status
- Least Concern (IUCN 3.1)

Scientific classification
- Kingdom: Animalia
- Phylum: Chordata
- Class: Aves
- Order: Passeriformes
- Family: Tyrannidae
- Genus: Ornithion
- Species: O. semiflavum

Binomial name
- Ornithion semiflavum (Sclater, PL & Salvin, 1860)

= Yellow-bellied tyrannulet =

Species of bird

The yellow-bellied tyrannulet (Ornithion semiflavum) is a species of bird in subfamily Elaeniinae of family Tyrannidae, the tyrant flycatchers. It is found in Belize, Costa Rica, Guatemala, Honduras, Mexico, Nicaragua, and Panama.

== Taxonomy and systematics ==
The yellow-bellied tyrannulet and the brown-capped tyrannulet (O. brunneicapillus) were for a time considered to be conspecific and now are deemed a superspecies. Both are now monotypic.

== Description ==
The yellow-bellied tyrannulet is 8 to 9 cm (3.1 to 3.5 in) long and weighs about 7 to 8 g (0.25 to 0.28 oz). It is a small flycatcher with a pointed bill. The sexes have the same plumage. Adults have a slate-grey crown with a white forehead, lores, and supercilium on an otherwise olive-brown face. Their upperparts are bright olive. Their wings and tail are dusky olive. Their underparts are bright yellow with faint olive streaks on the breast and flanks. Both sexes have a brown iris, a black bill with an arched maxilla, and dark gray legs and feet. Juveniles have a brown tinge on their crown and upperparts and paler yellow underparts than adults.

== Distribution and habitat ==
The yellow-bellied tyrannulet is found from Veracruz and Oaxaca in southern Mexico south through Guatemala, Belize, Honduras, Nicaragua, and Costa Rica into extreme western Panama. It is not found on the Yucatán Peninsula or in El Salvador. It occurs on the Caribbean slope from Mexico into northern Costa Rica and on the Pacific slope from central Costa Rica into Panama. The species inhabits the tropical zone, primarily the interior and edges of humid evergreen forest and mature secondary forest, plantations, gardens with tall trees, and taller semi-deciduous scrublands. In elevation it ranges from sea level to 1,500 m (4,900 ft) in most of its range but reaches only 600 m (2,000 ft) in Costa Rica.

== Behavior ==
=== Movement ===
The yellow-bellied tyrannulet is a year-round resident throughout its range.

=== Feeding ===
The yellow-bellied tyrannulet's behavior is much like that of a warbler (Parulidae) or vireo (Vireonidae). It feeds almost exclusively on arthropods. It usually forages singly or in pairs, and from the forest's mid-level to the canopy but lower on its edges. It occasionally joins mixed-species feeding flocks. It takes most prey by gleaning from leaves, twigs, and stems while perched.

=== Breeding ===
The yellow-bellied tyrannulet apparently breeds between March and June. Its nest is thought to be globe-shaped and hidden in a clump of bromeliads or in a large dead and curled leaf. Nothing else is known about the species' breeding biology.

=== Vocalization ===
The yellow-bellied tyrannulet's call is "a high-pitched whistle (weeauuuu or peauuuu)" that is sometimes doubled. It also makes "an agitated 'rubber duck' quality series of whistles pip'a'pip'a-pip-pip-peauuu-peauuu-pip'a-pip'a'pip'a".

== Status ==
The IUCN has assessed the yellow-bellied tyrannulet as being of Least Concern. It has a large range; its estimated population of at least 50,000 mature individuals is believed to be decreasing. No immediate threats have been identified. It is considered uncommon in northern Central America and very uncommon in Costa Rica. It is found in several protected areas in Belize, Guatemala, and Costa Rica.
