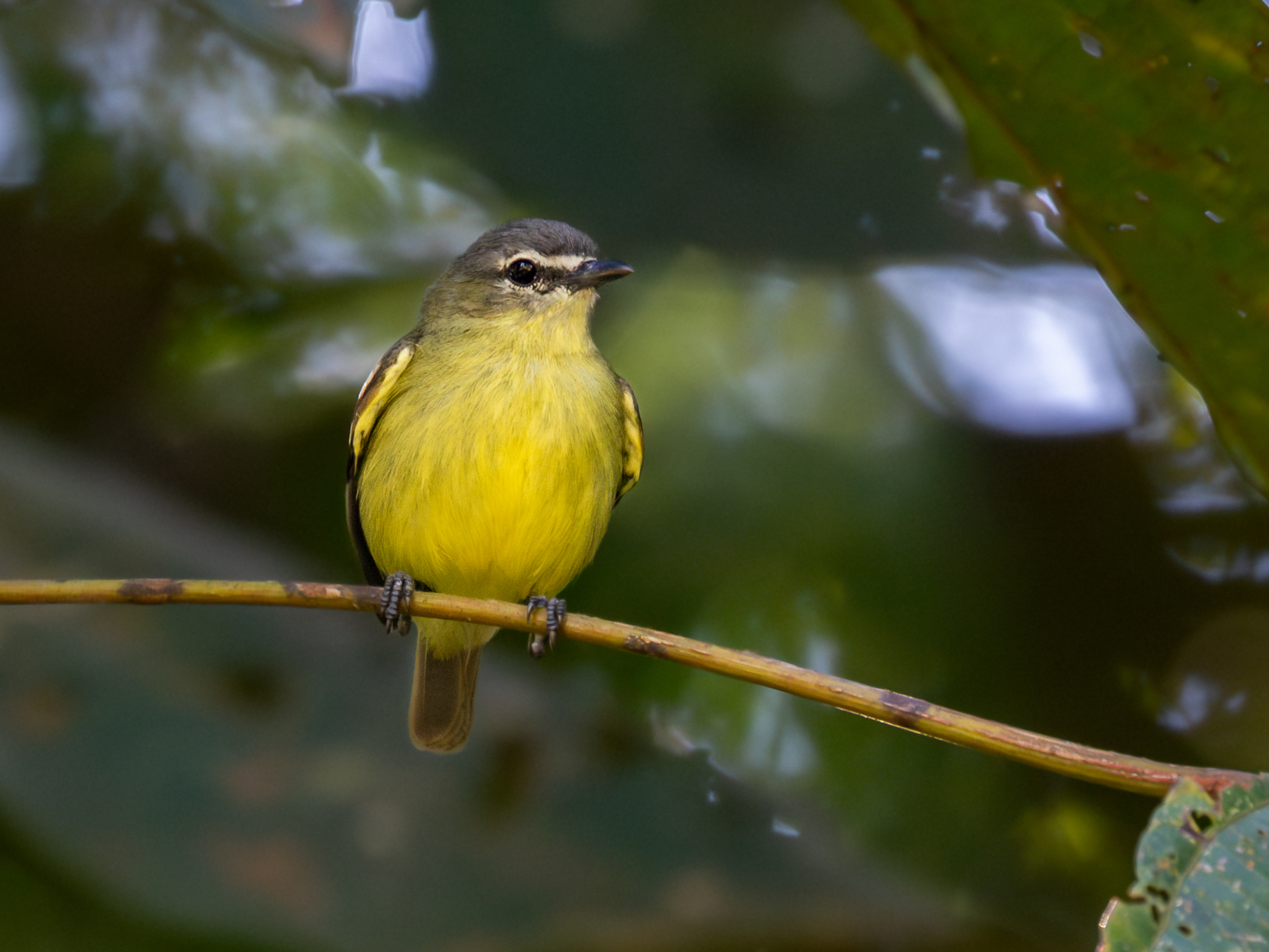
- White-lored tyrannulet (Ornithion inerme)

Scientific classification
- Kingdom: Animalia
- Phylum: Chordata
- Class: Aves
- Order: Passeriformes
- Family: Tyrannidae
- Genus: Ornithion; Hartlaub, 1853

Type species
- Ornithion inerme Hartlaub, 1853

= Ornithion =

Genus of birds

Ornithion is a genus of birds in the large tyrant flycatcher family Tyrannidae.

== Species ==
The genus contains three species:

Genus Ornithion – Hartlaub, 1853 – three species
Common name	Scientific name and subspecies	Range	Size and ecology	IUCN status and estimated population
Brown-capped tyrannulet	Ornithion brunneicapillus (Lawrence, 1862)	Colombia, Costa Rica, Ecuador, Panama, and Venezuela.	Size: Habitat: Diet:	LC
White-lored tyrannulet	Ornithion inerme Hartlaub, 1853	Bolivia, Brazil, Colombia, Ecuador, French Guiana, Guyana, Peru, Suriname, and Venezuela.	Size: Habitat: Diet:	LC
Yellow-bellied tyrannulet	Ornithion semiflavum (Sclater, PL & Salvin, 1860)	Belize, Costa Rica, Guatemala, Honduras, Mexico, and Nicaragua.	Size: Habitat: Diet:	LC
