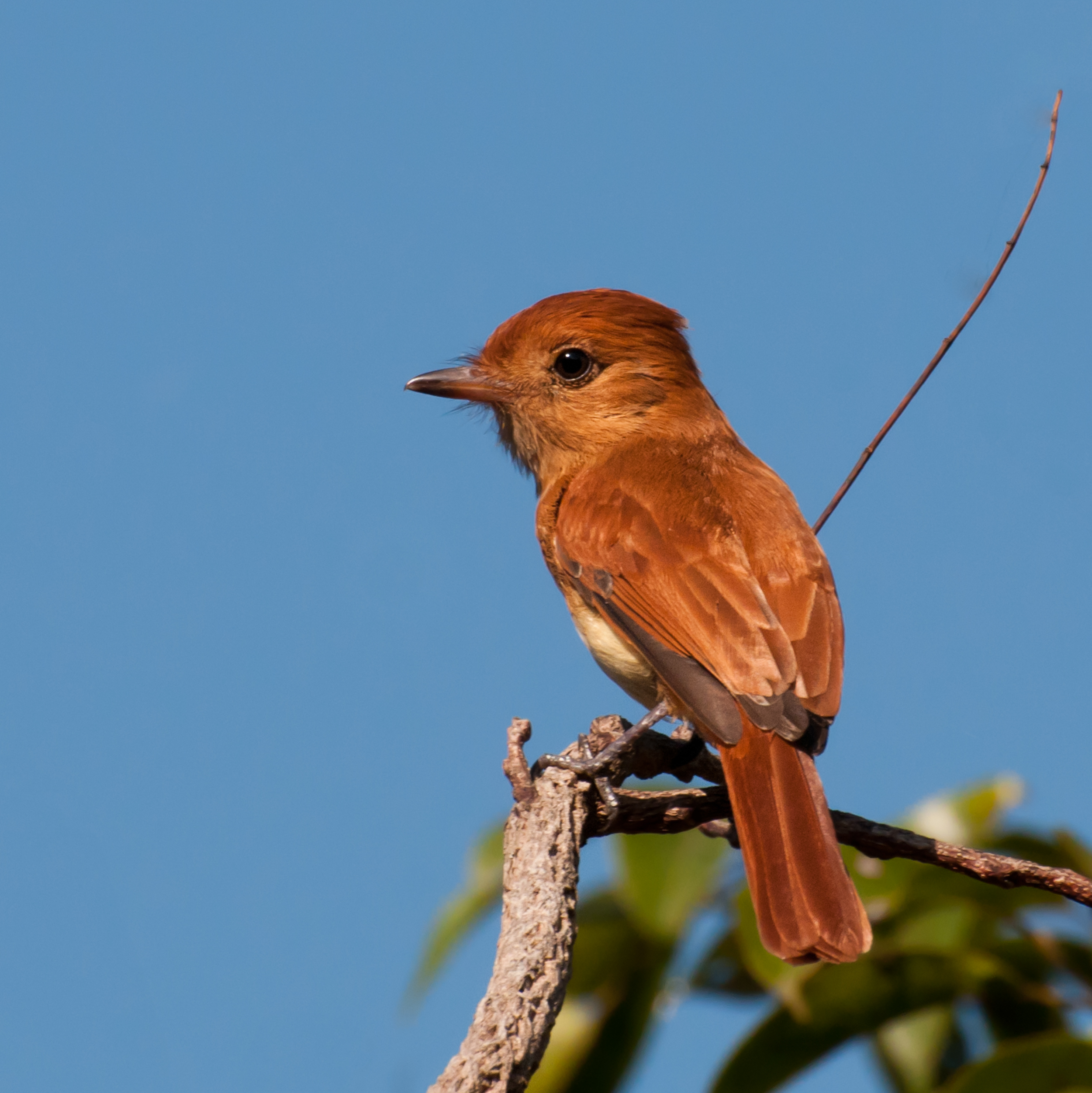
- at Piraju, São Paulo State, Brazil

Conservation status
- Least Concern (IUCN 3.1)

Scientific classification
- Kingdom: Animalia
- Phylum: Chordata
- Class: Aves
- Order: Passeriformes
- Family: Tyrannidae
- Genus: Casiornis
- Species: C. rufus

Binomial name
- Casiornis rufus (Vieillot, 1816)

= Rufous casiornis =

Species of bird

The rufous casiornis (Casiornis rufus) is a species of bird in the family Tyrannidae, the tyrant flycatchers. It is found in Argentina, Bolivia, Brazil, Paraguay, Peru, Uruguay, and as a vagrant to Chile.

== Taxonomy and systematics ==
The rufous casiornis was originally described as Thamnophilus rufus, mistakenly placing it in the "typical antbird" family Thamnophilidae. It was later moved to genus Casiornis that was erected in 1856. During the first half of the twentieth century many authors placed that genus in family Cotingidae but starting in the 1970s it was recognized as belonging to Tyrannidae. The rufous casiornis shares the genus with the ash-throated casiornis (C. fuscus) and the two form a superspecies. For a time they were treated as conspecific but early in the twenty-first century they were firmly established as separate species.

The rufous casiornis is monotypic.

== Description ==
The rufous casiornis is 17 to 18 cm (6.7 to 7.1 in) long and weighs 22 to 27 g (0.78 to 0.95 oz). The sexes have the same plumage. Adults have a rufous head, upperparts, wings, and tail. Their throat and breast are cinnamon with a whitish middle of the throat. Their belly is pale buffy yellowish. They have a dark brown iris, a dark bill with a pinkish base, and blackish gray legs and feet.

== Distribution and habitat ==
The rufous casiornis is found from southeastern Peru south through much of Bolivia and Paraguay, into northern Argentina as far as Tucumán and Corrientes provinces, and slightly into northern Uruguay. Its range extends east into Brazil with the boundary roughly formed by central Rondônia, central Pará, western Piauí, southern Minas Gerais, and southern Mato Grosso do Sul. It has also occurred as a vagrant in Chile.

The rufous casiornis inhabits a variety of wooded landscapes including deciduous woodlands, gallery woodlands, wooded cerrado, and scrubby and wooded Chaco. It has been reported in dry forest in parts of Peru. In Brazil it ranges in elevation from near sea level to 1,500 m (4,900 ft). It locally reaches 2,500 m (8,200 ft) in Bolivia.

== Behavior ==
=== Movement ===
The rufous casiornis is migratory but the timing and extent of its movements are known only in outline. It apparently is found in the northern half of its range only in the austral winter, though whether it entirely or partially leaves the southern half is unknown. It is considered as a non-breeding migrant in Peru.

=== Feeding ===
The rufous casiornis is thought to capture insect prey with sallies from a perch. Nothing else is known about its diet or feeding behavior.

=== Breeding ===
Two rufous casiornis nests are known. They were in tree cavities about 1.2 and 1.5 m (4 and 5 ft) above the ground. Nothing else is known about the species' breeding biology.

=== Vocalization ===
The rufous casiornis is rather quiet. It makes a "very high, downslurred feeeèh" and a "brief, weak psee note".

== Status ==
The IUCN has assessed the rufous casiornis as being of Least Concern. It has a large range; its population size is unknown and is believed to be decreasing. No immediate threats have been identified. It is considered fairly common overall though rare in Peru. It is known in Uruguay only from 1999. It is found in protected areas in both its breeding and non-breeding ranges. However, "[m]uch of this species' preferred habitat has been converted for agricultural use and eucalypt (Eucalyptus) and pine (Pinus) plantations".
