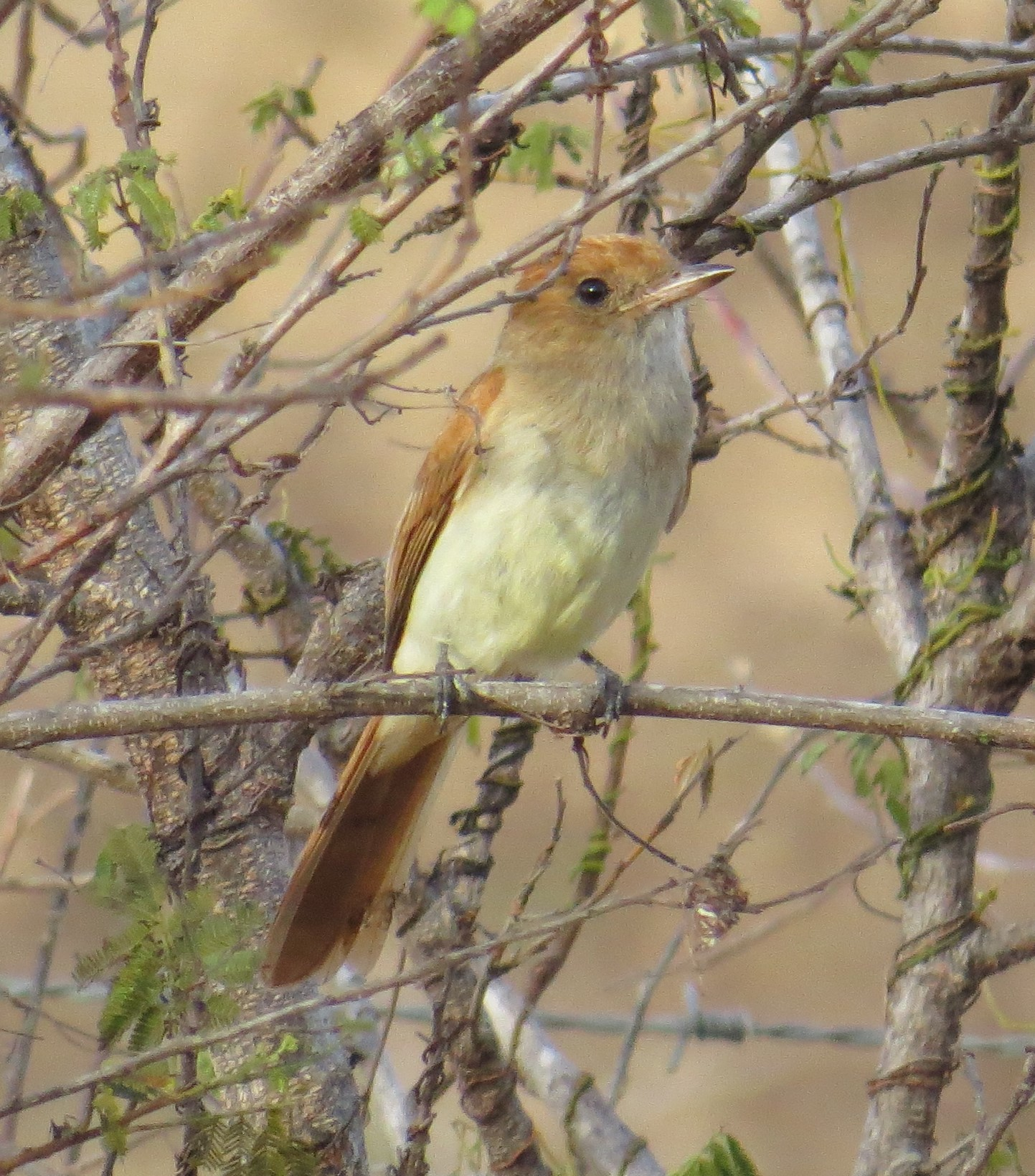

Conservation status
- Least Concern (IUCN 3.1)

Scientific classification
- Kingdom: Animalia
- Phylum: Chordata
- Class: Aves
- Order: Passeriformes
- Family: Tyrannidae
- Genus: Casiornis
- Species: C. fuscus

Binomial name
- Casiornis fuscus Sclater, PL & Salvin, 1873

= Ash-throated casiornis =

Species of bird

The ash-throated casiornis (Casiornis fuscus) is a species of bird in the family Tyrannidae, the tyrant flycatchers. It is endemic to Brazil.

== Taxonomy and systematics ==
The ash-throated casiornis was originally described with its current binomial Casiornis fuscus. Genus Casiornis had been erected in 1856. During the first half of the twentieth century many authors placed that genus in family Cotingidae but starting in the 1970s it was recognized as belonging to Tyrannidae. The ash-throated casiornis shares the genus with the rufous casiornis (C. rufus) and the two form a superspecies. For a time they were treated as conspecific but early in the twenty-first century they were firmly established as separate species.

The ash-throated casiornis is monotypic.

== Description ==
The ash-throated casiornis is 18 cm (7.1 in) long and weighs about 19.5 g (0.69 oz). The sexes have the same plumage. Adults have a rufous crown, a paler rufous face, a sandy brown back, and a rufous tail. Their wings are dusky with wide rufous to buff edges on the feathers. Their throat is pale grayish that becomes grayish fawn on the breast and pale creamy yellowish on the belly. They have a dark brown iris, a dark bill with a pinkish base, and blackish legs and feet.

== Distribution and habitat ==
The ash-throated casiornis is found in eastern Brazil south of the Amazon. Its range's inland boundary is roughly the lower Tapajós River in central Pará, eastern Pará south to northeastern Mato Grosso, and east through southern Tocantins, northeastern Goias, far northern Minas Gerais, central Bahia, and central Sergipe. It primarily inhabits woodlands in caatinga and heavily wooded cerrado. Along the lower Amazon it also occurs in campina. In elevation it ranges from sea level to about 500 m (1,600 ft).

== Behavior ==
=== Movement ===
The ash-throated casiornis was long thought to be non-migratory. However, a study published in 2016 documented significant dry-season movement from the caatinga west into the cerrado. The study's data suggest that, while many individuals remain in the caatinga year-round, the species is found in cerrado almost exclusively between June and September.

=== Feeding ===
The ash-throated casiornis is thought to capture insect prey with sallies from a perch. Nothing else is known about its diet or feeding behavior.

=== Breeding ===
An active ash-throated casiornis nest was discovered in January but nothing else is known about the species' breeding biology.

=== Vocalization ===
As of July 2025 xeno-canto had 10 recordings of ash-throated casiornis vocalizations; the Cornell Lab's Macaulay Library had 11 with some overlap. Its song has not been described. One call is "a short, decisive tsip!". Another call is a "very high, downslurred tjef".

== Status ==
The IUCN has assessed the ash-throated casiornis as being of Least Concern. It has a large range; its population size is unknown and is believed to be decreasing. No immediate threats have been identified. It is considered uncommon to locally fairly common though not well known. It occurs in at least two national parks. "Both caatinga and wooded cerrado [are] subject to increasing human pressure...these habitats are increasingly used for timber and cattle grazing, and are converted for agriculture and tree plantations."
