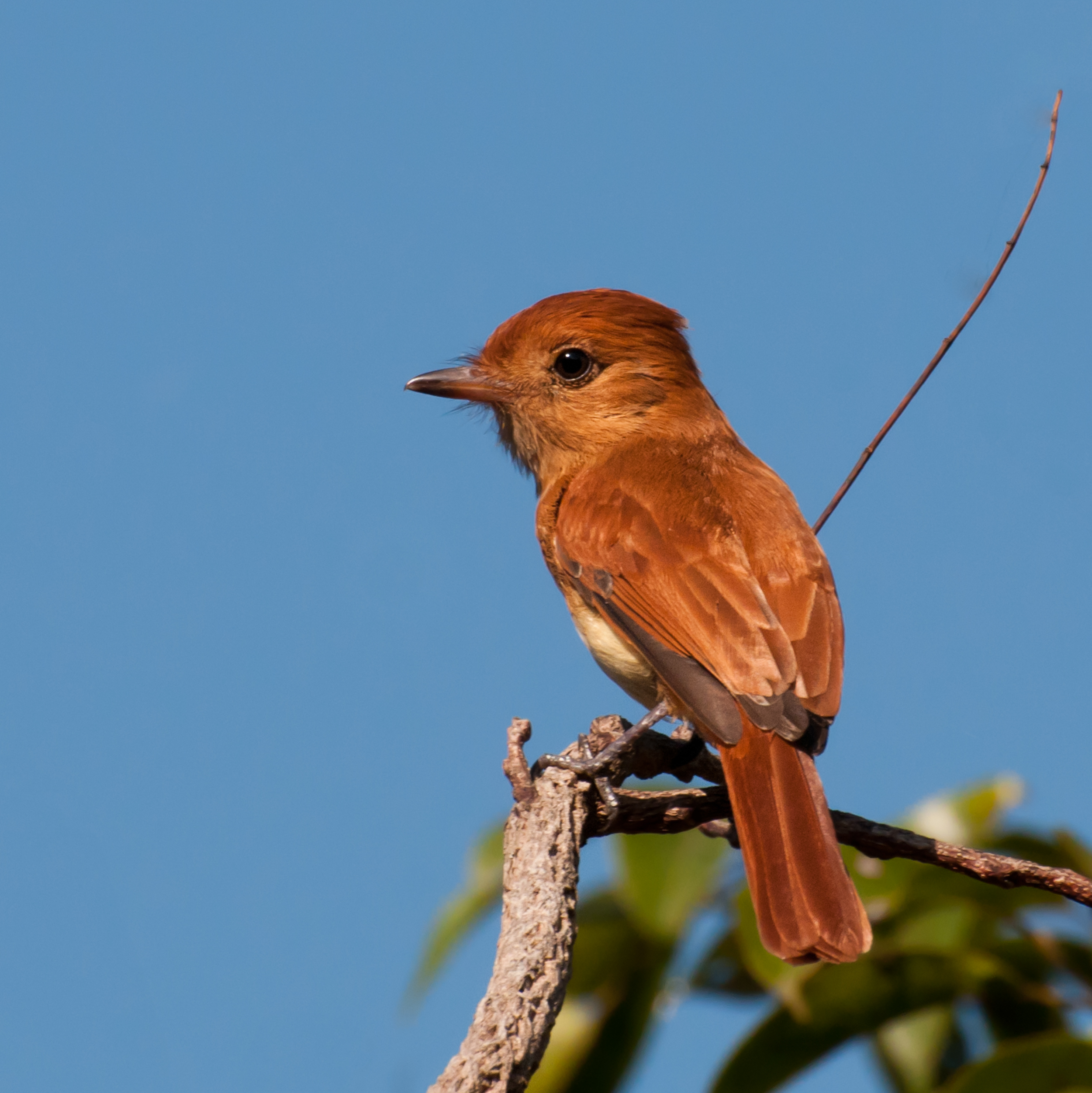
- Rufous casiornis (Casiornis rufus)

Scientific classification
- Kingdom: Animalia
- Phylum: Chordata
- Class: Aves
- Order: Passeriformes
- Family: Tyrannidae
- Genus: Casiornis; Des Murs, 1856

Type species
- Casiornis typus Des Murs, 1856

= Casiornis =

Genus of birds

Casiornis is a genus of South American birds in the tyrant flycatcher family Tyrannidae.

The genus contains the following two species:

Image	Common name	Scientific name	Distribution
	Rufous casiornis	Casiornis rufus	Argentina, Bolivia, mid-central Brazil, Paraguay, and northeastern Uruguay
	Ash-throated casiornis	Casiornis fuscus	northeastern Brazil.
