= List of tyrant flycatchers =

The International Ornithological Committee (IOC) recognizes these 447 species in family Tyrannidae, the tyrant flycatchers; they are distributed among 106 genera. One extinct species, the San Cristobal flycatcher, is included. This list is presented according to the IOC taxonomic sequence and can also be sorted alphabetically by common name and binomial.

== List ==
Common name	Binomial name + authority	IOC sequence
Grey-headed piprites	Piprites griseiceps Salvin, 1865	1
Wing-barred piprites	Piprites chloris (Temminck, 1822)	2
Black-capped piprites	Piprites pileata (Temminck, 1822)	3
Greenish tyrannulet	Phyllomyias virescens (Temminck, 1824)	4
Reiser's tyrannulet	Phyllomyias reiseri Hellmayr, 1905	5
Urich's tyrannulet	Phyllomyias urichi (Chapman, 1899)	6
Sclater's tyrannulet	Phyllomyias sclateri Berlepsch, 1901	7
Yungas tyrannulet	Phyllomyias weedeni Herzog, Kessler & Balderrama, 2008	8
Planalto tyrannulet	Phyllomyias fasciatus (Thunberg, 1822)	9
Sooty-headed tyrannulet	Phyllomyias griseiceps (Sclater, PL & Salvin, 1871)	10
Plumbeous-crowned tyrannulet	Phyllomyias plumbeiceps (Lawrence, 1869)	11
Grey-capped tyrannulet	Phyllomyias griseocapilla Sclater, PL, 1862	12
Rough-legged tyrannulet	Acrochordopus burmeisteri Cabanis & Heine, 1860	13
White-fronted tyrannulet	Acrochordopus zeledoni (Lawrence, 1869)	14
Black-capped tyrannulet	Tyranniscus nigrocapillus (Lafresnaye, 1845)	15
Ashy-headed tyrannulet	Tyranniscus cinereiceps (Sclater, PL, 1860)	16
Tawny-rumped tyrannulet	Tyranniscus uropygialis (Lawrence, 1869)	17
Yellow-crowned tyrannulet	Tyrannulus elatus (Latham, 1790)	18
Forest elaenia	Myiopagis gaimardii (d'Orbigny, 1840)	19
Choco elaenia	Myiopagis parambae (Hellmayr, 1904)	20
Amazonian elaenia	Myiopagis cinerea (Pelzeln, 1868)	21
Grey-headed elaenia	Myiopagis caniceps (Swainson, 1835)	22
Foothill elaenia	Myiopagis olallai Coopmans & Krabbe, 2000	23
Pacific elaenia	Myiopagis subplacens (Sclater, PL, 1862)	24
Yellow-crowned elaenia	Myiopagis flavivertex (Sclater, PL, 1887)	25
Greenish elaenia	Myiopagis viridicata (Vieillot, 1817)	26
Jamaican elaenia	Myiopagis cotta (Gosse, 1849)	27
Yellow-bellied elaenia	Elaenia flavogaster (Thunberg, 1822)	28
Caribbean elaenia	Elaenia martinica (Linnaeus, 1766)	29
Large elaenia	Elaenia spectabilis Pelzeln, 1868	30
Noronha elaenia	Elaenia ridleyana Sharpe, 1888	31
White-crested elaenia	Elaenia albiceps (d'Orbigny & Lafresnaye, 1837)	32
Chilean elaenia	Elaenia chilensis Hellmayr, 1927	33
Small-billed elaenia	Elaenia parvirostris Pelzeln, 1868	34
Olivaceous elaenia	Elaenia mesoleuca (Deppe, 1830)	35
Slaty elaenia	Elaenia strepera Cabanis, 1883	36
Mottle-backed elaenia	Elaenia gigas Sclater, PL, 1871	37
Brownish elaenia	Elaenia pelzelni Berlepsch, 1907	38
Plain-crested elaenia	Elaenia cristata Pelzeln, 1868	39
Lesser elaenia	Elaenia chiriquensis Lawrence, 1865	40
Coopmans's elaenia	Elaenia brachyptera Berlepsch, 1907	41
Rufous-crowned elaenia	Elaenia ruficeps Pelzeln, 1868	42
Mountain elaenia	Elaenia frantzii Lawrence, 1865	43
Highland elaenia	Elaenia obscura (d'Orbigny & Lafresnaye, 1837)	44
Small-headed elaenia	Elaenia sordida Zimmer, JT, 1941	45
Great elaenia	Elaenia dayi Chapman, 1929	46
Sierran elaenia	Elaenia pallatangae Sclater, PL, 1862	47
Tepui elaenia	Elaenia olivina Salvin & Godman, 1884	48
Greater Antillean elaenia	Elaenia fallax Sclater, PL, 1861	49
Yellow-bellied tyrannulet	Ornithion semiflavum (Sclater, PL & Salvin, 1860)	50
Brown-capped tyrannulet	Ornithion brunneicapillus (Lawrence, 1862)	51
White-lored tyrannulet	Ornithion inerme Hartlaub, 1853	52
Northern beardless tyrannulet	Camptostoma imberbe Sclater, PL, 1857	53
Southern beardless tyrannulet	Camptostoma obsoletum (Temminck, 1824)	54
Suiriri flycatcher	Suiriri suiriri (Vieillot, 1818)	55
White-throated tyrannulet	Mecocerculus leucophrys (d'Orbigny & Lafresnaye, 1837)	56
White-tailed tyrannulet	Mecocerculus poecilocercus (Sclater, PL & Salvin, 1873)	57
Buff-banded tyrannulet	Mecocerculus hellmayri Berlepsch, 1907	58
Rufous-winged tyrannulet	Mecocerculus calopterus (Sclater, PL, 1859)	59
Sulphur-bellied tyrannulet	Mecocerculus minor (Taczanowski, 1879)	60
White-banded tyrannulet	Mecocerculus stictopterus (Sclater, PL, 1859)	61
Black-crested tit-tyrant	Anairetes nigrocristatus Taczanowski, 1884	62
Pied-crested tit-tyrant	Anairetes reguloides (d'Orbigny & Lafresnaye, 1837)	63
Ash-breasted tit-tyrant	Anairetes alpinus (Carriker, 1933)	64
Yellow-billed tit-tyrant	Anairetes flavirostris Sclater, PL & Salvin, 1876	65
Tufted tit-tyrant	Anairetes parulus (Kittlitz, 1830)	66
Juan Fernandez tit-tyrant	Anairetes fernandezianus (Philippi, 1857)	67
Agile tit-tyrant	Uromyias agilis (Sclater, PL, 1856)	68
Unstreaked tit-tyrant	Uromyias agraphia (Chapman, 1919)	69
Torrent tyrannulet	Serpophaga cinerea (Tschudi, 1844)	70
River tyrannulet	Serpophaga hypoleuca Sclater, PL & Salvin, 1866	71
Sooty tyrannulet	Serpophaga nigricans (Vieillot, 1817)	72
White-crested tyrannulet	Serpophaga subcristata (Vieillot, 1817)	73
Straneck's tyrannulet	Serpophaga griseicapilla Straneck, 2007	74
Northern mouse-colored tyrannulet	Nesotriccus incomtus (Cabanis & Heine, 1860)	75
Cocos flycatcher	Nesotriccus ridgwayi Townsend, CH, 1895	76
Southern mouse-colored tyrannulet	Nesotriccus murinus (Spix, 1825)	77
Tumbesian tyrannulet	Nesotriccus tumbezanus (Taczanowski, 1877)	78
Maranon tyrannulet	Nesotriccus maranonicus (Zimmer, JT, 1941)	79
Yellow tyrannulet	Capsiempis flaveola (Lichtenstein, MHC, 1823)	80
Bearded tachuri	Polystictus pectoralis (Vieillot, 1817)	81
Grey-backed tachuri	Polystictus superciliaris (Wied-Neuwied, M, 1831)	82
Dinelli's doradito	Pseudocolopteryx dinelliana Lillo, 1905	83
Crested doradito	Pseudocolopteryx sclateri (Oustalet, 1892)	84
Subtropical doradito	Pseudocolopteryx acutipennis (Sclater, PL & Salvin, 1873)	85
Warbling doradito	Pseudocolopteryx flaviventris (d'Orbigny & Lafresnaye, 1837)	86
Ticking doradito	Pseudocolopteryx citreola (Landbeck, 1864)	87
Bronze-olive pygmy tyrant	Pseudotriccus pelzelni Taczanowski & Berlepsch, 1885	88
Hazel-fronted pygmy tyrant	Pseudotriccus simplex (Berlepsch, 1901)	89
Rufous-headed pygmy tyrant	Pseudotriccus ruficeps (Lafresnaye, 1843)	90
Ringed antpipit	Corythopis torquatus Tschudi, 1844	91
Southern antpipit	Corythopis delalandi (Lesson, RP, 1831)	92
Fulvous-crowned scrub tyrant	Euscarthmus meloryphus Wied-Neuwied, M, 1831	93
Fulvous-faced scrub tyrant	Euscarthmus fulviceps Sclater, PL, 1871	94
Rufous-sided scrub tyrant	Euscarthmus rufomarginatus (Pelzeln, 1868)	95
Grey-and-white tyrannulet	Pseudelaenia leucospodia (Taczanowski, 1877)	96
Lesser wagtail-tyrant	Stigmatura napensis Chapman, 1926	97
Bahia wagtail-tyrant	Stigmatura bahiae Chapman, 1926	98
Greater wagtail-tyrant	Stigmatura budytoides (d'Orbigny & Lafresnaye, 1837)	99
Guatemalan tyrannulet	Zimmerius vilissimus (Sclater, PL & Salvin, 1859)	100
Mistletoe tyrannulet	Zimmerius parvus (Lawrence, 1862)	101
Spectacled tyrannulet	Zimmerius improbus (Sclater, PL & Salvin, 1871)	102
Venezuelan tyrannulet	Zimmerius petersi (Berlepsch, 1907)	103
Bolivian tyrannulet	Zimmerius bolivianus (d'Orbigny, 1840)	104
Red-billed tyrannulet	Zimmerius cinereicapilla (Cabanis, 1873)	105
Mishana tyrannulet	Zimmerius villarejoi Álvarez A, J & Whitney, 2001	106
Chico's tyrannulet	Zimmerius chicomendesi Whitney, Schunck, Rêgo, MA & Silveira, 2013	107
Slender-footed tyrannulet	Zimmerius gracilipes (Sclater, PL & Salvin, 1868)	108
Guianan tyrannulet	Zimmerius acer (Salvin & Godman, 1883)	109
Golden-faced tyrannulet	Zimmerius chrysops (Sclater, PL, 1859)	110
Coopmans's tyrannulet	Zimmerius minimus (Chapman, 1912)	111
Choco tyrannulet	Zimmerius albigularis (Chapman, 1924)	112
Loja tyrannulet	Zimmerius flavidifrons (Sclater, PL, 1860)	113
Peruvian tyrannulet	Zimmerius viridiflavus (Tschudi, 1844)	114
Variegated bristle tyrant	Pogonotriccus poecilotis (Sclater, PL, 1862)	115
Chapman's bristle tyrant	Pogonotriccus chapmani (Gilliard, 1940)	116
Marble-faced bristle tyrant	Pogonotriccus ophthalmicus Taczanowski, 1874	117
Spectacled bristle tyrant	Pogonotriccus orbitalis (Cabanis, 1873)	118
Venezuelan bristle tyrant	Pogonotriccus venezuelanus Berlepsch, 1907	119
Antioquia bristle tyrant	Pogonotriccus lanyoni (Graves, GR, 1988)	120
Southern bristle tyrant	Pogonotriccus eximius (Temminck, 1822)	121
Sao Paulo bristle tyrant	Pogonotriccus paulista Ihering, HFA & Ihering, R, 1907	122
Serra do Mar bristle tyrant	Pogonotriccus difficilis (Ihering, HFA & Ihering, R, 1907)	123
Mottle-cheeked tyrannulet	Phylloscartes ventralis (Temminck, 1824)	124
Alagoas tyrannulet	Phylloscartes ceciliae Teixeira, 1987	125
Restinga tyrannulet	Phylloscartes kronei Willis & Oniki, 1992	126
Bahia tyrannulet	Phylloscartes beckeri Gonzaga & Pacheco, 1995	127
Panama tyrannulet	Phylloscartes flavovirens (Lawrence, 1862)	128
Olive-green tyrannulet	Phylloscartes virescens Todd, 1925	129
Ecuadorian tyrannulet	Phylloscartes gualaquizae (Sclater, PL, 1887)	130
Black-fronted tyrannulet	Phylloscartes nigrifrons (Salvin & Godman, 1884)	131
Rufous-browed tyrannulet	Phylloscartes superciliaris (Sclater, PL & Salvin, 1868)	132
Rufous-lored tyrannulet	Phylloscartes flaviventris (Hartert, EJO, 1897)	133
Cinnamon-faced tyrannulet	Phylloscartes parkeri Fitzpatrick & Stotz, 1997	134
Minas Gerais tyrannulet	Phylloscartes roquettei Snethlage, E, 1928	135
Oustalet's tyrannulet	Phylloscartes oustaleti (Sclater, PL, 1887)	136
Bay-ringed tyrannulet	Phylloscartes sylviolus (Cabanis & Heine, 1860)	137
Streak-necked flycatcher	Mionectes striaticollis (d'Orbigny & Lafresnaye, 1837)	138
Olive-streaked flycatcher	Mionectes olivaceus Lawrence, 1868	139
Olive-striped flycatcher	Mionectes galbinus Bangs, 1902	140
Ochre-bellied flycatcher	Mionectes oleagineus (Lichtenstein, MHC, 1823)	141
McConnell's flycatcher	Mionectes macconnelli (Chubb, C, 1919)	142
Sierra de Lema flycatcher	Mionectes roraimae (Chubb, C, 1919)	143
Grey-hooded flycatcher	Mionectes rufiventris Cabanis, 1846	144
Sepia-capped flycatcher	Leptopogon amaurocephalus Cabanis, 1846	145
Slaty-capped flycatcher	Leptopogon superciliaris Tschudi, 1844	146
Rufous-breasted flycatcher	Leptopogon rufipectus (Lafresnaye, 1846)	147
Inca flycatcher	Leptopogon taczanowskii Hellmayr, 1917	148
Chapada flycatcher	Guyramemua affine (Burmeister, 1856)	149
Northern scrub flycatcher	Sublegatus arenarum (Salvin, 1863)	150
Amazonian scrub flycatcher	Sublegatus obscurior Todd, 1920	151
Southern scrub flycatcher	Sublegatus modestus (Wied-Neuwied, M, 1831)	152
Slender-billed inezia	Inezia tenuirostris (Cory, 1913)	153
Plain inezia	Inezia inornata (Salvadori, 1897)	154
Amazonian inezia	Inezia subflava (Sclater, PL & Salvin, 1873)	155
Pale-tipped inezia	Inezia caudata (Salvin, 1897)	156
Flavescent flycatcher	Myiophobus flavicans (Sclater, PL, 1861)	157
Orange-crested flycatcher	Myiophobus phoenicomitra (Taczanowski & Berlepsch, 1885)	158
Unadorned flycatcher	Myiophobus inornatus Carriker, 1932	159
Roraiman flycatcher	Myiophobus roraimae (Salvin & Godman, 1883)	160
Olive-chested flycatcher	Myiophobus cryptoxanthus (Sclater, PL, 1861)	161
Bran-colored flycatcher	Myiophobus fasciatus (Müller, PLS, 1776)	162
Mouse-grey flycatcher	Myiophobus crypterythrus (Sclater, PL, 1861)	163
Rufescent flycatcher	Myiophobus rufescens (Salvadori, 1864)	164
Handsome flycatcher	Nephelomyias pulcher (Sclater, PL, 1861)	165
Orange-banded flycatcher	Nephelomyias lintoni (Meyer de Schauensee, 1951)	166
Ochraceous-breasted flycatcher	Nephelomyias ochraceiventris (Cabanis, 1873)	167
Ornate flycatcher	Myiotriccus ornatus (Lafresnaye, 1853)	168
Many-colored rush tyrant	Tachuris rubrigastra (Vieillot, 1817)	169
Sharp-tailed grass tyrant	Culicivora caudacuta (Vieillot, 1818)	170
Drab-breasted bamboo tyrant	Hemitriccus diops (Temminck, 1822)	171
Brown-breasted bamboo tyrant	Hemitriccus obsoletus (Miranda-Ribeiro, 1905)	172
Flammulated bamboo tyrant	Hemitriccus flammulatus Berlepsch, 1901	173
Snethlage's tody-tyrant	Hemitriccus minor (Snethlage, E, 1907)	174
Yungas tody-tyrant	Hemitriccus spodiops (Berlepsch, 1901)	175
Acre tody-tyrant	Hemitriccus cohnhafti Zimmer, KJ, Whittaker, Sardelli, Guilherme & Aleixo, 2013	176
Boat-billed tody-tyrant	Hemitriccus josephinae (Chubb, C, 1914)	177
White-eyed tody-tyrant	Hemitriccus zosterops (Pelzeln, 1868)	178
White-bellied tody-tyrant	Hemitriccus griseipectus (Snethlage, E, 1907)	179
Zimmer's tody-tyrant	Hemitriccus minimus (Todd, 1925)	180
Eye-ringed tody-tyrant	Hemitriccus orbitatus (Wied-Neuwied, M, 1831)	181
Johannes's tody-tyrant	Hemitriccus iohannis (Snethlage, E, 1907)	182
Stripe-necked tody-tyrant	Hemitriccus striaticollis (Lafresnaye, 1853)	183
Hangnest tody-tyrant	Hemitriccus nidipendulus (Wied-Neuwied, M, 1831)	184
Pearly-vented tody-tyrant	Hemitriccus margaritaceiventer (d'Orbigny & Lafresnaye, 1837)	185
Pelzeln's tody-tyrant	Hemitriccus inornatus (Pelzeln, 1868)	186
Black-throated tody-tyrant	Hemitriccus granadensis (Hartlaub, 1843)	187
Buff-breasted tody-tyrant	Hemitriccus mirandae (Snethlage, E, 1925)	188
Cinnamon-breasted tody-tyrant	Hemitriccus cinnamomeipectus Fitzpatrick & O'Neill, 1979	189
Kaempfer's tody-tyrant	Hemitriccus kaempferi (Zimmer, JT, 1953)	190
Buff-throated tody-tyrant	Hemitriccus rufigularis (Cabanis, 1873)	191
Fork-tailed tody-tyrant	Hemitriccus furcatus (Lafresnaye, 1846)	192
Eared pygmy tyrant	Myiornis auricularis (Vieillot, 1818)	193
White-bellied pygmy tyrant	Myiornis albiventris (Berlepsch & Stolzmann, 1894)	194
Black-capped pygmy tyrant	Myiornis atricapillus (Lawrence, 1875)	195
Short-tailed pygmy tyrant	Myiornis ecaudatus (d'Orbigny & Lafresnaye, 1837)	196
Northern bentbill	Oncostoma cinereigulare (Sclater, PL, 1857)	197
Southern bentbill	Oncostoma olivaceum (Lawrence, 1862)	198
Scale-crested pygmy tyrant	Lophotriccus pileatus (Tschudi, 1844)	199
Long-crested pygmy tyrant	Lophotriccus eulophotes Todd, 1925	200
Double-banded pygmy tyrant	Lophotriccus vitiosus (Bangs & Penard, TE, 1921)	201
Helmeted pygmy tyrant	Lophotriccus galeatus (Boddaert, 1783)	202
Pale-eyed pygmy tyrant	Atalotriccus pilaris (Cabanis, 1847)	203
Rufous-crowned tody-flycatcher	Poecilotriccus ruficeps (Kaup, 1852)	204
Lulu's tody-flycatcher	Poecilotriccus luluae Johnson, NK & Jones, RE, 2001	205
White-cheeked tody-flycatcher	Poecilotriccus albifacies (Blake, 1959)	206
Black-and-white tody-flycatcher	Poecilotriccus capitalis (Sclater, PL, 1857)	207
Buff-cheeked tody-flycatcher	Poecilotriccus senex (Pelzeln, 1868)	208
Ruddy tody-flycatcher	Poecilotriccus russatus (Salvin & Godman, 1884)	209
Ochre-faced tody-flycatcher	Poecilotriccus plumbeiceps (Lafresnaye, 1846)	210
Smoky-fronted tody-flycatcher	Poecilotriccus fumifrons (Hartlaub, 1853)	211
Rusty-fronted tody-flycatcher	Poecilotriccus latirostris (Pelzeln, 1868)	212
Slaty-headed tody-flycatcher	Poecilotriccus sylvia (Desmarest, 1806)	213
Golden-winged tody-flycatcher	Poecilotriccus calopterus (Sclater, PL, 1857)	214
Black-backed tody-flycatcher	Poecilotriccus pulchellus (Sclater, PL, 1874)	215
Black-chested tyrant	Taeniotriccus andrei Berlepsch & Hartert, EJO, 1902	216
Spotted tody-flycatcher	Todirostrum maculatum (Desmarest, 1806)	217
Yellow-lored tody-flycatcher	Todirostrum poliocephalum (Wied-Neuwied, M, 1831)	218
Common tody-flycatcher	Todirostrum cinereum (Linnaeus, 1766)	219
Maracaibo tody-flycatcher	Todirostrum viridanum Hellmayr, 1927	220
Painted tody-flycatcher	Todirostrum pictum Salvin, 1897	221
Yellow-browed tody-flycatcher	Todirostrum chrysocrotaphum Strickland, 1850	222
Black-headed tody-flycatcher	Todirostrum nigriceps Sclater, PL, 1855	223
Brownish twistwing	Cnipodectes subbrunneus (Sclater, PL, 1860)	224
Rufous twistwing	Cnipodectes superrufus Lane, Servat, Valqui & Lambert, 2007	225
Pacific flatbill	Rhynchocyclus pacificus (Chapman, 1914)	226
Eye-ringed flatbill	Rhynchocyclus brevirostris (Cabanis, 1847)	227
Fulvous-breasted flatbill	Rhynchocyclus fulvipectus (Sclater, PL, 1860)	228
Western olivaceous flatbill	Rhynchocyclus aequinoctialis (Sclater, PL, 1858)	229
Eastern olivaceous flatbill	Rhynchocyclus olivaceus (Temminck, 1820)	230
Yellow-olive flatbill	Tolmomyias sulphurescens (Spix, 1825)	231
Orange-eyed flatbill	Tolmomyias traylori Schulenberg & Parker, TA, 1997	232
Yellow-winged flatbill	Tolmomyias flavotectus (Hartert, EJO, 1902)	233
Yellow-margined flatbill	Tolmomyias assimilis (Pelzeln, 1868)	234
Grey-crowned flatbill	Tolmomyias poliocephalus (Taczanowski, 1884)	235
Ochre-lored flatbill	Tolmomyias flaviventris (Wied-Neuwied, M, 1831)	236
Olive-faced flatbill	Tolmomyias viridiceps (Sclater, PL & Salvin, 1873)	237
Kinglet calyptura	Calyptura cristata (Vieillot, 1818)	238
Cinnamon-crested spadebill	Platyrinchus saturatus Salvin & Godman, 1882	239
Stub-tailed spadebill	Platyrinchus cancrominus Sclater, PL & Salvin, 1860	240
White-throated spadebill	Platyrinchus mystaceus Vieillot, 1818	241
Golden-crowned spadebill	Platyrinchus coronatus Sclater, PL, 1858	242
Yellow-throated spadebill	Platyrinchus flavigularis Sclater, PL, 1862	243
White-crested spadebill	Platyrinchus platyrhynchos (Gmelin, JF, 1788)	244
Russet-winged spadebill	Platyrinchus leucoryphus Wied-Neuwied, M, 1831	245
Cinnamon neopipo	Neopipo cinnamomea (Lawrence, 1869)	246
Cinnamon flycatcher	Pyrrhomyias cinnamomeus (d'Orbigny & Lafresnaye, 1837)	247
Cliff flycatcher	Hirundinea ferruginea (Gmelin, JF, 1788)	248
Euler's flycatcher	Lathrotriccus euleri (Cabanis, 1868)	249
Grey-breasted flycatcher	Lathrotriccus griseipectus (Lawrence, 1869)	250
Tawny-chested flycatcher	Aphanotriccus capitalis (Salvin, 1865)	251
Black-billed flycatcher	Aphanotriccus audax (Nelson, 1912)	252
Fuscous flycatcher	Cnemotriccus fuscatus (Wied-Neuwied, M, 1831)	253
Belted flycatcher	Xenotriccus callizonus Dwight & Griscom, 1927	254
Pileated flycatcher	Xenotriccus mexicanus (Zimmer, JT, 1938)	255
Eastern phoebe	Sayornis phoebe (Latham, 1790)	256
Black phoebe	Sayornis nigricans (Swainson, 1827)	257
Say's phoebe	Sayornis saya (Bonaparte, 1825)	258
Northern tufted flycatcher	Mitrephanes phaeocercus (Sclater, PL, 1859)	259
Olive tufted flycatcher	Mitrephanes olivaceus Berlepsch & Stolzmann, 1894	260
Olive-sided flycatcher	Contopus cooperi (Nuttall, 1831)	261
Greater pewee	Contopus pertinax Cabanis & Heine, 1860	262
Dark pewee	Contopus lugubris Lawrence, 1865	263
Smoke-colored pewee	Contopus fumigatus (d'Orbigny & Lafresnaye, 1837)	264
Ochraceous pewee	Contopus ochraceus Sclater, PL & Salvin, 1869	265
Western wood pewee	Contopus sordidulus Sclater, PL, 1859	266
Eastern wood pewee	Contopus virens (Linnaeus, 1766)	267
Northern tropical pewee	Contopus bogotensis (Bonaparte, 1850)	268
Tumbes pewee	Contopus punensis Lawrence, 1869	269
Southern tropical pewee	Contopus cinereus (Spix, 1825)	270
White-throated pewee	Contopus albogularis (Berlioz, 1962)	271
Blackish pewee	Contopus nigrescens (Sclater, PL & Salvin, 1880)	272
Cuban pewee	Contopus caribaeus (d'Orbigny, 1839)	273
Hispaniolan pewee	Contopus hispaniolensis (Bryant, H, 1867)	274
Jamaican pewee	Contopus pallidus (Gosse, 1847)	275
Lesser Antillean pewee	Contopus latirostris (Verreaux, J, 1866)	276
Yellow-bellied flycatcher	Empidonax flaviventris (Baird, WM & Baird, SF, 1843)	277
Acadian flycatcher	Empidonax virescens (Vieillot, 1818)	278
Willow flycatcher	Empidonax traillii (Audubon, 1828)	279
Alder flycatcher	Empidonax alnorum Brewster, 1895	280
White-throated flycatcher	Empidonax albigularis Sclater, PL & Salvin, 1859	281
Least flycatcher	Empidonax minimus (Baird, WM & Baird, SF, 1843)	282
Hammond's flycatcher	Empidonax hammondii (Xántus, J, 1858)	283
American dusky flycatcher	Empidonax oberholseri Phillips, AR, 1939	284
American grey flycatcher	Empidonax wrightii Baird, SF, 1858	285
Pine flycatcher	Empidonax affinis (Swainson, 1827)	286
Western flycatcher	Empidonax difficilis Baird, SF, 1858	287
Yellowish flycatcher	Empidonax flavescens Lawrence, 1865	288
Buff-breasted flycatcher	Empidonax fulvifrons (Giraud Jr, 1841)	289
Black-capped flycatcher	Empidonax atriceps Salvin, 1870	290
Scarlet flycatcher	Pyrocephalus rubinus (Boddaert, 1783)	291
Vermilion flycatcher	Pyrocephalus obscurus Gould, 1839	292
Darwin's flycatcher	Pyrocephalus nanus Gould, 1838	293
San Cristobal flycatcher	Pyrocephalus dubius Gould, 1839	294
Drab water tyrant	Ochthornis littoralis (Pelzeln, 1868)	295
Yellow-browed tyrant	Satrapa icterophrys (Vieillot, 1818)	296
Little ground tyrant	Syrtidicola fluviatilis (Sclater, PL & Salvin, 1866)	297
Spot-billed ground tyrant	Muscisaxicola maculirostris d'Orbigny & Lafresnaye, 1837	298
White-fronted ground tyrant	Muscisaxicola albifrons (Tschudi, 1844)	299
Ochre-naped ground tyrant	Muscisaxicola flavinucha Lafresnaye, 1855	300
Paramo ground tyrant	Muscisaxicola alpinus (Jardine, 1849)	301
Taczanowski's ground tyrant	Muscisaxicola griseus Taczanowski, 1884	302
Cinereous ground tyrant	Muscisaxicola cinereus Philippi & Landbeck, 1864	303
Rufous-naped ground tyrant	Muscisaxicola rufivertex d'Orbigny & Lafresnaye, 1837	304
Dark-faced ground tyrant	Muscisaxicola maclovianus (Garnot, 1826)	305
White-browed ground tyrant	Muscisaxicola albilora Lafresnaye, 1855	306
Cinnamon-bellied ground tyrant	Muscisaxicola capistratus (Burmeister, 1860)	307
Puna ground tyrant	Muscisaxicola juninensis Taczanowski, 1884	308
Black-fronted ground tyrant	Muscisaxicola frontalis (Burmeister, 1860)	309
Andean negrito	Lessonia oreas (Sclater, PL & Salvin, 1869)	310
Austral negrito	Lessonia rufa (Gmelin, JF, 1789)	311
Spectacled tyrant	Hymenops perspicillatus (Gmelin, JF, 1789)	312
Blue-billed black tyrant	Knipolegus cyanirostris (Vieillot, 1818)	313
Jelski's black tyrant	Knipolegus signatus (Taczanowski, 1875)	314
Plumbeous tyrant	Knipolegus cabanisi Schulz, 1882	315
Cinereous tyrant	Knipolegus striaticeps (d'Orbigny & Lafresnaye, 1837)	316
White-winged black tyrant	Knipolegus aterrimus Kaup, 1853	317
Hudson's black tyrant	Knipolegus hudsoni Sclater, PL, 1872	318
Rufous-tailed tyrant	Knipolegus poecilurus (Sclater, PL, 1862)	319
Riverside tyrant	Knipolegus orenocensis Berlepsch, 1884	320
Amazonian black tyrant	Knipolegus poecilocercus (Pelzeln, 1868)	321
Crested black tyrant	Knipolegus lophotes Boie, F, 1828	322
Velvety black tyrant	Knipolegus nigerrimus (Vieillot, 1818)	323
Sao Francisco black tyrant	Knipolegus franciscanus Snethlage, E, 1928	324
Red-rumped bush tyrant	Cnemarchus erythropygius (Sclater, PL, 1853)	325
Rufous-webbed bush tyrant	Cnemarchus rufipennis (Taczanowski, 1874)	326
White-rumped monjita	Xolmis velatus (Lichtenstein, MHC, 1823)	327
White monjita	Xolmis irupero (Vieillot, 1823)	328
Fire-eyed diucon	Pyrope pyrope (Kittlitz, 1830)	329
Grey monjita	Nengetus cinereus (Vieillot, 1816)	330
Black-crowned monjita	Neoxolmis coronatus (Vieillot, 1823)	331
Rusty-backed monjita	Neoxolmis rubetra (Burmeister, 1860)	332
Salinas monjita	Neoxolmis salinarum (Nores & Yzurieta, 1979)	333
Chocolate-vented tyrant	Neoxolmis rufiventris (Vieillot, 1823)	334
Streak-throated bush tyrant	Myiotheretes striaticollis (Sclater, PL, 1853)	335
Rufous-bellied bush tyrant	Myiotheretes fuscorufus (Sclater, PL & Salvin, 1876)	336
Santa Marta bush tyrant	Myiotheretes pernix (Bangs, 1899)	337
Smoky bush tyrant	Myiotheretes fumigatus (Boissonneau, 1840)	338
Black-billed shrike-tyrant	Agriornis montanus (d'Orbigny & Lafresnaye, 1837)	339
Lesser shrike-tyrant	Agriornis murinus (d'Orbigny & Lafresnaye, 1837)	340
White-tailed shrike-tyrant	Agriornis albicauda (Philippi & Landbeck, 1863)	341
Grey-bellied shrike-tyrant	Agriornis micropterus Gould, 1839	342
Great shrike-tyrant	Agriornis lividus (Kittlitz, 1835)	343
Streamer-tailed tyrant	Gubernetes yetapa (Vieillot, 1818)	344
Shear-tailed grey tyrant	Muscipipra vetula (Lichtenstein, MHC, 1823)	345
Pied water tyrant	Fluvicola pica (Boddaert, 1783)	346
Black-backed water tyrant	Fluvicola albiventer (Spix, 1825)	347
Masked water tyrant	Fluvicola nengeta (Linnaeus, 1766)	348
White-headed marsh tyrant	Arundinicola leucocephala (Linnaeus, 1764)	349
Black-and-white monjita	Heteroxolmis dominicana (Vieillot, 1823)	350
Cock-tailed tyrant	Alectrurus tricolor (Vieillot, 1816)	351
Strange-tailed tyrant	Alectrurus risora (Vieillot, 1824)	352
Tumbes tyrant	Tumbezia salvini (Taczanowski, 1877)	353
Crowned chat-tyrant	Silvicultrix frontalis (Lafresnaye, 1847)	354
Kalinowski's chat-tyrant	Silvicultrix spodionota (Berlepsch & Stolzmann, 1896)	355
Golden-browed chat-tyrant	Silvicultrix pulchella (Sclater, PL & Salvin, 1876)	356
Yellow-bellied chat-tyrant	Silvicultrix diadema (Hartlaub, 1843)	357
Jelski's chat-tyrant	Silvicultrix jelskii (Taczanowski, 1883)	358
Slaty-backed chat-tyrant	Ochthoeca cinnamomeiventris (Lafresnaye, 1843)	359
Blackish chat-tyrant	Ochthoeca nigrita Sclater, PL & Salvin, 1871	360
Maroon-belted chat-tyrant	Ochthoeca thoracica Taczanowski, 1874	361
Rufous-breasted chat-tyrant	Ochthoeca rufipectoralis (d'Orbigny & Lafresnaye, 1837)	362
Brown-backed chat-tyrant	Ochthoeca fumicolor Sclater, PL, 1856	363
Rufous-browed chat-tyrant	Ochthoeca superciliosa Sclater, PL & Salvin, 1871	364
D'Orbigny's chat-tyrant	Ochthoeca oenanthoides (d'Orbigny & Lafresnaye, 1837)	365
White-browed chat-tyrant	Ochthoeca leucophrys (d'Orbigny & Lafresnaye, 1837)	366
Piura chat-tyrant	Ochthoeca piurae Chapman, 1924	367
Patagonian tyrant	Colorhamphus parvirostris (Gould & Gray, GR, 1839)	368
Long-tailed tyrant	Colonia colonus (Vieillot, 1818)	369
Short-tailed field tyrant	Muscigralla brevicauda d'Orbigny & Lafresnaye, 1837	370
Cattle tyrant	Machetornis rixosa (Vieillot, 1819)	371
Piratic flycatcher	Legatus leucophaius (Vieillot, 1818)	372
White-bearded flycatcher	Phelpsia inornata (Lawrence, 1869)	373
Rusty-margined flycatcher	Myiozetetes cayanensis (Linnaeus, 1766)	374
Social flycatcher	Myiozetetes similis (Spix, 1825)	375
Grey-capped flycatcher	Myiozetetes granadensis Lawrence, 1862	376
Dusky-chested flycatcher	Myiozetetes luteiventris (Sclater, PL, 1858)	377
Great Kiskadee	Pitangus sulphuratus (Linnaeus, 1766)	378
Lesser Kiskadee	Philohydor lictor (Lichtenstein, MHC, 1823)	379
White-ringed flycatcher	Conopias albovittatus (Lawrence, 1862)	380
Yellow-throated flycatcher	Conopias parvus (Pelzeln, 1868)	381
Three-striped flycatcher	Conopias trivirgatus (Wied-Neuwied, M, 1831)	382
Lemon-browed flycatcher	Conopias cinchoneti (Tschudi, 1844)	383
Golden-bellied flycatcher	Myiodynastes hemichrysus (Cabanis, 1861)	384
Golden-crowned flycatcher	Myiodynastes chrysocephalus (Tschudi, 1844)	385
Baird's flycatcher	Myiodynastes bairdii (Gambel, 1847)	386
Sulphur-bellied flycatcher	Myiodynastes luteiventris Sclater, PL, 1859	387
Streaked flycatcher	Myiodynastes maculatus (Müller, PLS, 1776)	388
Boat-billed flycatcher	Megarynchus pitangua (Linnaeus, 1766)	389
Sulphury flycatcher	Tyrannopsis sulphurea (Spix, 1825)	390
Variegated flycatcher	Empidonomus varius (Vieillot, 1818)	391
Crowned slaty flycatcher	Griseotyrannus aurantioatrocristatus (d'Orbigny & Lafresnaye, 1837)	392
Snowy-throated kingbird	Tyrannus niveigularis Sclater, PL, 1860	393
White-throated kingbird	Tyrannus albogularis Burmeister, 1856	394
Tropical kingbird	Tyrannus melancholicus Vieillot, 1819	395
Couch's kingbird	Tyrannus couchii Baird, SF, 1858	396
Cassin's kingbird	Tyrannus vociferans Swainson, 1826	397
Thick-billed kingbird	Tyrannus crassirostris Swainson, 1826	398
Western kingbird	Tyrannus verticalis Say, 1822	399
Scissor-tailed flycatcher	Tyrannus forficatus (Gmelin, JF, 1789)	400
Fork-tailed flycatcher	Tyrannus savana Daudin, 1802	401
Eastern kingbird	Tyrannus tyrannus (Linnaeus, 1758)	402
Grey kingbird	Tyrannus dominicensis (Gmelin, JF, 1788)	403
Giant kingbird	Tyrannus cubensis Richmond, 1898	404
Loggerhead kingbird	Tyrannus caudifasciatus d'Orbigny, 1839	405
Greyish mourner	Rhytipterna simplex (Lichtenstein, MHC, 1823)	406
Pale-bellied mourner	Rhytipterna immunda (Sclater, PL & Salvin, 1873)	407
Rufous mourner	Rhytipterna holerythra (Sclater, PL & Salvin, 1860)	408
Sibilant sirystes	Sirystes sibilator (Vieillot, 1818)	409
White-rumped sirystes	Sirystes albocinereus Sclater, PL & Salvin, 1880	410
Todd's sirystes	Sirystes subcanescens Todd, 1920	411
Choco sirystes	Sirystes albogriseus (Lawrence, 1863)	412
Rufous casiornis	Casiornis rufus (Vieillot, 1816)	413
Ash-throated casiornis	Casiornis fuscus Sclater, PL & Salvin, 1873	414
Rufous flycatcher	Myiarchus semirufus Sclater, PL & Salvin, 1878	415
Yucatan flycatcher	Myiarchus yucatanensis Lawrence, 1871	416
Sad flycatcher	Myiarchus barbirostris (Swainson, 1827)	417
Dusky-capped flycatcher	Myiarchus tuberculifer (d'Orbigny & Lafresnaye, 1837)	418
Swainson's flycatcher	Myiarchus swainsoni Cabanis & Heine, 1860	419
Venezuelan flycatcher	Myiarchus venezuelensis Lawrence, 1865	420
Panama flycatcher	Myiarchus panamensis Lawrence, 1860	421
Short-crested flycatcher	Myiarchus ferox (Gmelin, JF, 1789)	422
Apical flycatcher	Myiarchus apicalis Sclater, PL & Salvin, 1881	423
Pale-edged flycatcher	Myiarchus cephalotes Taczanowski, 1880	424
Sooty-crowned flycatcher	Myiarchus phaeocephalus Sclater, PL, 1860	425
Ash-throated flycatcher	Myiarchus cinerascens (Lawrence, 1851)	426
Nutting's flycatcher	Myiarchus nuttingi Ridgway, 1882	427
Great crested flycatcher	Myiarchus crinitus (Linnaeus, 1758)	428
Brown-crested flycatcher	Myiarchus tyrannulus (Müller, PLS, 1776)	429
Galapagos flycatcher	Myiarchus magnirostris (Gould, 1838)	430
Grenada flycatcher	Myiarchus nugator Riley, 1904	431
Rufous-tailed flycatcher	Myiarchus validus Cabanis, 1847	432
La Sagra's flycatcher	Myiarchus sagrae (Gundlach, 1852)	433
Stolid flycatcher	Myiarchus stolidus (Gosse, 1847)	434
Puerto Rican flycatcher	Myiarchus antillarum (Bryant, H, 1866)	435
Lesser Antillean flycatcher	Myiarchus oberi Lawrence, 1877	436
Large-headed flatbill	Ramphotrigon megacephalum (Swainson, 1835)	437
Flammulated flycatcher	Ramphotrigon flammulatum (Lawrence, 1875)	438
Rufous-tailed flatbill	Ramphotrigon ruficauda (Spix, 1825)	439
Dusky-tailed flatbill	Ramphotrigon fuscicauda Chapman, 1925	440
Rufous-tailed attila	Attila phoenicurus Pelzeln, 1868	441
Cinnamon attila	Attila cinnamomeus (Gmelin, JF, 1789)	442
Ochraceous attila	Attila torridus Sclater, PL, 1860	443
Citron-bellied attila	Attila citriniventris Sclater, PL, 1859	444
White-eyed attila	Attila bolivianus Lafresnaye, 1848	445
Grey-hooded attila	Attila rufus (Vieillot, 1819)	446
Bright-rumped attila	Attila spadiceus (Gmelin, JF, 1789)	447

== See also ==
- Tyrannidae genera and species
- Lists of birds
