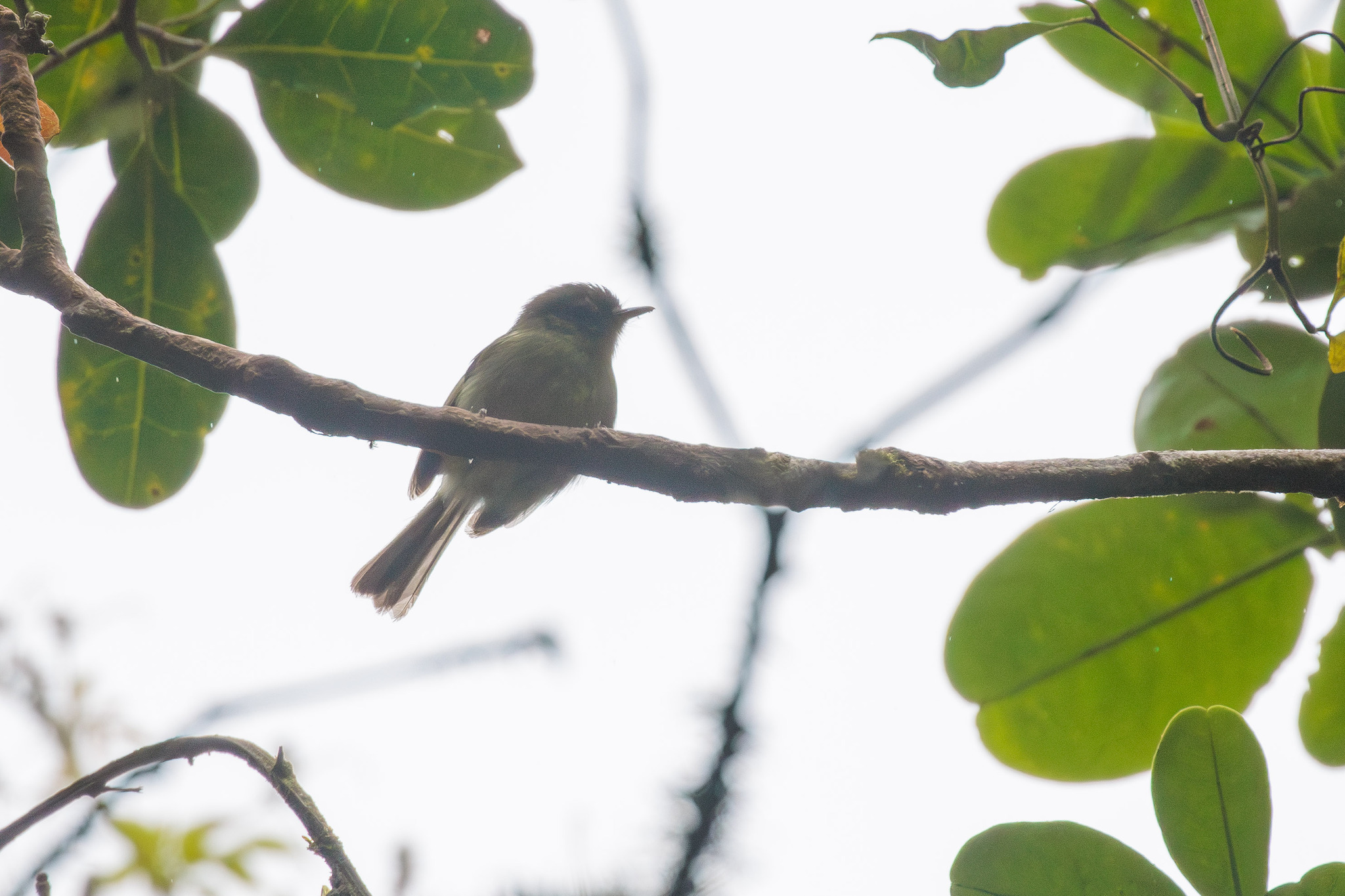

Conservation status
- Near Threatened (IUCN 3.1)

Scientific classification
- Kingdom: Animalia
- Phylum: Chordata
- Class: Aves
- Order: Passeriformes
- Family: Tyrannidae
- Genus: Phylloscartes
- Species: P. beckeri

Binomial name
- Phylloscartes beckeri Gonzaga & Pacheco, 1995

= Bahia tyrannulet =

Species of bird in Brazil

The Bahia tyrannulet (Phylloscartes beckeri) is an Endangered species of bird in the family Tyrannidae, the tyrant flycatchers. It is endemic to the Brazilian states of Bahia and Minas Gerais.

== Taxonomy and systematics ==
The Bahia tyrannulet is monotypic.

Gonzaga & Pacheco, who discovered and formally described the species, gave it its English name "because it is the only species of Phylloscartes known to be endemic to [the Bahia] area". They assigned the specific epithet beckeri to honor the Bahian biologist Johann Becker "in recognition of his long-standing interest in several fields of natural history".

The Bahia tyrannulet is the second to last of four species of genus Phylloscartes described in the late twentieth century. It was preceded by the Alagoas tyrannulet (P. ceciliae) in 1987 and the restinga tyrannulet (P. kronei) in 1992, and followed by the cinnamon-faced tyrannulet (P. parkeri) in 1997. The four were the first members of the genus described since the Minas Gerais tyrannulet (P. roquettei) in 1928, and as of late 2024 no others had been described.

== Description ==
The Bahia tyrannulet is about 12 cm (4.7 in) long and weighs 7.5 to 9 g (0.26 to 0.32 oz). The sexes have the same plumage. Adults have a buffy stripe from the lores that becomes creamy whitish past the eye, a buffy eye-ring, and a dusky line through the eye that continues to the rear and sweeps around the dark yellowish ear coverts. Their crown, nape, back, and rump are bright olive-green with a grayish center to the crown. Their wings are dusky olive with pale yellow edges on the flight feathers. Their wing coverts have yellow tips that form two wing bars. Their tail is dusky olive with thin yellowish olive-green edges. Their throat and breast are dirty whitish with pale yellow flecks. The rest of their underparts are medium yellow with faint olive markings on the sides of the breast and flanks. Both sexes have a dark brown iris, a long, pointed, brown bill with a pearly whitish base to the mandible, and pale gray legs and feet.

== Distribution and habitat ==
The Bahia tyrannulet is known only from central and southern Bahia into northeastern Minas Gerais states of southeastern Brazil. It inhabits primary and mature secondary highland evergreen forest. In elevation it is known between 750 and 1,200 m (2,500 and 3,900 ft).

== Behavior ==
=== Movement ===
The Bahia tyrannulet is a year-round resident.

=== Feeding ===
The Bahia tyrannulet's diet has not been detailed but is known to include insects. It forages actively, usually in the upper third or quarter of the forest's height about 6 to 12 m (20 to 40 ft) above the ground. It typically perches on a branch and makes short sallies to grab or hover-glean prey from leaves and twigs. It typically forages in pairs or small (family?) groups and almost always as part of a mixed-species feeding flock.

=== Breeding ===
The Bahia tyrannulet is believed to breed between September and February. Nothing else is known about its breeding biology.

=== Vocalization ===
The Bahia tyrannulet's song is described as faint and twittery with short trills. Pairs make very soft "tik" contact calls.

== Status ==
The IUCN has assessed the Bahia tyrannulet as Near Threatened. It has a fragmented range and its estimated population of between 1,000 – 2,499 mature individuals (as of 2025) is believed to be decreasing. As of late 2024 it was known from seven sites in Bahia and two in Minas Gerais. It does occur in a few protected areas. Forests within its range are severely fragmented and under continuing threat from logging and conversion to agriculture and ranching. "This tyrannid's global population of a few thousand individuals is likely to decline rapidly in the near future, unless effective protection of Chapada Diamantina and surrounding forests is achieved, or new populations are found between there and Boa Nova."
