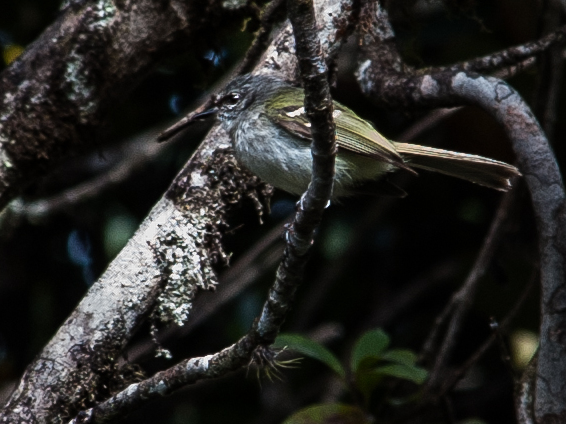

Conservation status
- Least Concern (IUCN 3.1)

Scientific classification
- Kingdom: Animalia
- Phylum: Chordata
- Class: Aves
- Order: Passeriformes
- Family: Tyrannidae
- Genus: Phylloscartes
- Species: P. nigrifrons

Binomial name
- Phylloscartes nigrifrons (Salvin & Godman, 1884)

= Black-fronted tyrannulet =

Species of bird

The black-fronted tyrannulet (Phylloscartes nigrifrons) is a species of bird in the family Tyrannidae, the tyrant flycatchers. It is found in Brazil, Guyana, and Venezuela.

== Taxonomy and systematics ==
The black-fronted tyrannulet was originally described in 1884 as Leptopogon nigrifrons. It was later transferred to genus Mecocerculus and then to its present genus Phylloscartes. Though relationships among members of Phylloscartes have not been fully resolved, it appears that the black-fronted tyrannulet's closest relatives are the rufous-lored tyrannulet (P. flaviventris) and the cinnamon-faced tyrannulet (P. parkeri).

The black-fronted tyrannulet is monotypic.

== Description ==
The black-fronted tyrannulet is 12 to 13 cm (4.7 to 5.1 in) long; five individuals weighed 8 to 11.1 g (0.28 to 0.39 oz). The sexes have the same plumage. Adults have a black forecrown ("front"), lores, and area behind the lores which give it a frowning appearance. They have a thin white supercilium. Their face is otherwise grizzled white and blackish with a black crescent around the ear coverts. Their crown is dark gray and the rest of their upperparts are dark olive. Their wings are blackish with thin pale olive yellow edges on the flight feathers. Their wing coverts are blackish with pale yellow to yellowish white tips that form two wing bars. Their long slender tail is olive. Their throat is mottled gray and white, their breast is pale gray, and their belly is pale yellowish white. Both sexes have a brown iris, a black bill, and gray legs and feet.

== Distribution and habitat ==
The black-fronted tyrannulet is found primarily in Venezuela, on the tepuis in the states of Amazonas and Bolívar. Its range extends slightly into adjacent western Guyana and far northwestern Brazil. It primarily inhabits the interior and edges of humid montane evergreen forest and to a lesser extent mature secondary forest dominated by Melastomataceae. In elevation it ranges between 900 and 1,800 m (3,000 and 5,900 ft) in Venezuela and between 800 and 1,800 m (2,600 and 5,900 ft) in Brazil.

== Behavior ==
=== Movement ===
The black-fronted tyrannulet is a year-round resident.

=== Feeding ===
The black-fronted tyrannulet's diet has not been detailed but is known to include insects, spiders, and small fruits. It forages actively, from the forest's lower story to its canopy. It typically perches horizontally on a branch, usually with its tail cocked up, and makes short sallies to hover-glean prey from leaves and twigs. It typically forages in pairs or small family groups and usually as part of a mixed-species feeding flock.

=== Breeding ===
Nothing is known about the black-fronted tyrannulet's breeding biology.

=== Vocalization ===
As of late 2024 xeno-canto had only eight recordings of black-fronted tyrannulet vocalizations; the Cornell Lab of Ornithology's Macaulay Library had 18.

The black-fronted tyrannulet's song, which is infrequently heard, is "a long (2-3 sec.), very thin trill, [with the] last half slightly descending". While foraging it sings "a thin, sharp tsuk-cheez-tr'r'r'r'r'r'r'r'r'r'r'r'r, 2nd note highest". While foraging it also makes a "cheh-cheh-ch'leet!" call.

== Status ==
The IUCN has assessed the black-fronted tyrannulet as being of Least Concern. It has a large range; its population size is not known and is believed to be decreasing. No immediate threats have been identified. It is considered fairly common and "occupies a region that is remote and difficult to access, but there are reports of severe local effects within this region from gold prospectors and 'uncontrolled tourism' ".
