= Minas Gerais (disambiguation) =

Minas Gerais is the second-most populous state of Brazil

Minas Gerais or Minas Geraes may also refer to:

- Campeonato Mineiro, the Brazilian name for the Minas Gerais state football league
- Minas Gerais tyrannulet, an endangered species of bird endemic to Brazilian dry forests

== Warships ==
- Brazilian battleship Minas Geraes, a battleship operating from 1910 until 1952
- Brazilian aircraft carrier Minas Gerais, a light aircraft carrier operating from 1956 until 2001
