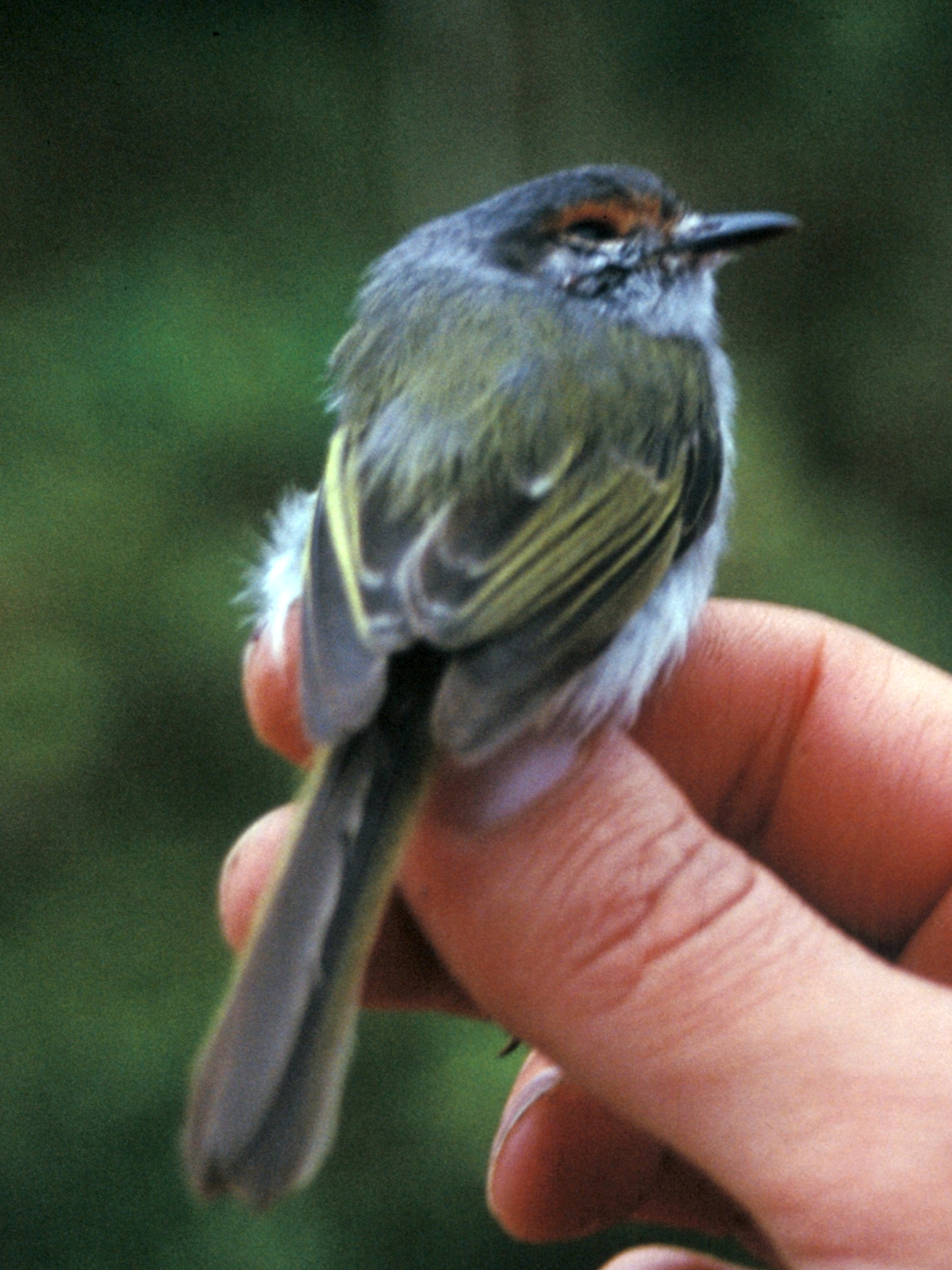

Conservation status
- Least Concern (IUCN 3.1)

Scientific classification
- Kingdom: Animalia
- Phylum: Chordata
- Class: Aves
- Order: Passeriformes
- Family: Tyrannidae
- Genus: Phylloscartes
- Species: P. superciliaris

Binomial name
- Phylloscartes superciliaris (Sclater, PL & Salvin, 1868)

= Rufous-browed tyrannulet =

Species of bird

The rufous-browed tyrannulet (Phylloscartes superciliaris) is a species of bird in the family Tyrannidae, the tyrant flycatchers. It is found in Colombia, Costa Rica, Ecuador, Panama, Venezuela, and possibly Peru.

== Taxonomy and systematics ==
The rufous-browed tyrannulet was originally described in 1868 as Leptotriccus superciliaris. It was later transferred to genus Mecocerculus and then to its present genus Phylloscartes. Though relationships among members of Phylloscartes have not been fully resolved, it appears that the rufous-browed tyrannulet's closest relatives are the rufous-lored tyrannulet (P. flaviventris) and the cinnamon-faced tyrannulet (P. parkeri).

The rufous-browed tyrannulet has three subspecies, the nominate P. s. superciliaris (Sclater, PL & Salvin, 1868), P. s. palloris (Griscom, 1935), and P. s. griseocapillus (Phelps, WH & Phelps, WH Jr, 1952). However, "their validity has been questioned ".

== Description ==
The rufous-browed tyrannulet is 9.5 to 12 cm (3.7 to 4.7 in) long; three individuals weighed 7 to 9 g (0.25 to 0.32 oz). The sexes have the same plumage. The forecrown and lores of nominate adults are bright chestnut that extends to the rear as a thin supercilium. They have a small white spot at the base of the bill. Their ear coverts are white with a thin but conspicuous black border and the rest of their face is grizzled whitish. Their crown is pearly gray and the rest of their upperparts are bright olive. Their wings are dusky olive with yellowish green edges on the flight feathers. Their long slender tail is dusky olive. Their throat is grayish white. The rest of their underparts are white with a yellowish green tinge on the flanks and a yellowish tinge on the belly and undertail coverts. Subspecies P. s. palloris is duller overall than the nominate with a darker crown, a dull olive green back, and paler underparts. P. s. griseocapillus has a darker gray crown, a brighter green back, a grayer breast, and yellower undertail coverts than the nominate. Both sexes of all subspecies have a dark brown iris, a black bill, and gray legs and feet.

== Distribution and habitat ==
The rufous-browed tyrannulet has a disjunct distribution. The nominate subspecies is the northernmost. It is found in Costa Rica on the Caribbean slope from the Cordillera de Guanacaste to the Cordillera Central and separately in western Panama from Bocas del Toro Province to Coclé Province, also on the Caribbean slope. Subspecies P. s. palloris is found in eastern Panama's Darién Province and adjacent northwestern Colombia. P. s. griseocapillus is found in the Serranía del Perijá that straddles the Colombia-Venezuela border, patchily in the northern Colombian Andes, and on the eastern Andean slope in southern Ecuador's Cordillera de Cutucú and Cordillera del Cóndor. Some authors extend the Cordillera del Cóndor range of griseocapillus into extreme northern Peru. However, the South American Classification Committee of the American Ornithological Society has only sight records from Peru and therefore treats the rufous-browed tyrannulet as hypothetical in that country.

The rufous-browed tyrannulet inhabits the canopy and edges of humid and wet montane evergreen forest in the subtropical zone. In elevation it ranges between 500 and 1,300 m (1,600 and 4,300 ft) in Costa Rica and slightly lower in Panama, between 1,000 and 2,200 m (3,300 and 7,200 ft) in Colombia, between 1,650 and 2,000 m (5,400 and 6,600 ft) in Venezuela, between 1,300 and 1,700 m (4,300 and 5,600 ft) in Ecuador, and between 1,400 and 1,800 m (4,600 and 5,900 ft) in Peru.

== Behavior ==
=== Movement ===
The rufous-browed tyrannulet is a year-round resident.

=== Feeding ===
The rufous-browed tyrannulet's diet has not been detailed but is thought to be primarily insects and include small fruits. It forages actively, mostly in the forest canopy and sometimes lower, especially at forest edges. It typically perches horizontally on a branch, often with its tail cocked up, and makes short sallies to hover-glean prey from leaves and twigs. It typically forages singly, in pairs, and sometimes in small family groups, and regularly as part of a mixed-species feeding flock.

=== Breeding ===
The rufous-browed tyrannulet is thought to breed between March and May or June in Costa Rica. Nothing else is known about its breeding biology.

=== Vocalization ===
The rufous-browed tyrannulet's song is variously described as a "lively and arresting...wiss, wreewreewreewreewree and wree tititititi", "a spritely spee-ee-ee-ee-ee, spee-dididee", and "a high, springy, laughing chatter that quavers: chi chi tchrrEE'EE'ee'EE'EE'eew or shorter tchwee tchwee ti-titititew". Its call is "a sharp, emphatic screesh" or "a high tchwee".

== Status ==
The IUCN has assessed the rufous-browed tyrannulet as being of Least Concern. It has a large range; its population is estimated to be at least 50,000 mature individuals and is believed to be decreasing. No immediate threats have been identified. It is considered "quite uncommon" in Costa Rica, "local and enigmatic" in Colombia, "apparently relatively common" in Venezuela, "local" in Ecuador, and "locally fairly common" in Peru. "Human activity has little short-term direct effect on Rufous-browed Tyrannulet, other than the local effects of habitat destruction."
