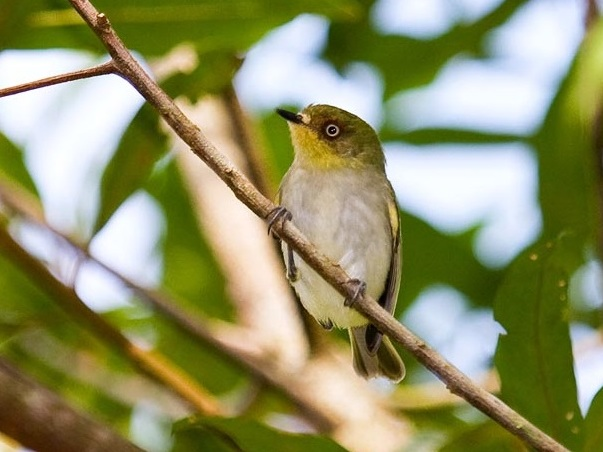
- at Iporanga, São Paulo State, Brazil

Conservation status
- Least Concern (IUCN 3.1)

Scientific classification
- Kingdom: Animalia
- Phylum: Chordata
- Class: Aves
- Order: Passeriformes
- Family: Tyrannidae
- Genus: Phylloscartes
- Species: P. sylviolus

Binomial name
- Phylloscartes sylviolus (Cabanis & Heine, 1860)

= Bay-ringed tyrannulet =

Species of bird

The bay-ringed tyrannulet (Phylloscartes sylviolus) is a species of bird in the family Tyrannidae, the tyrant flycatchers. It is found in Argentina, Brazil, and Paraguay.

== Taxonomy and systematics ==
The bay-ringed tyrannulet was originally described as Leptotriccus sylviolus. Genus Leptotriccus was merged into Phylloscartes in the 1970s. Though relationships among members of Phylloscartes have not been fully resolved, it appears that the bay-ringed tyrannulet's closest relatives are the rufous-lored tyrannulet (P. flaviventris) and the cinnamon-faced tyrannulet (P. parkeri).

The bay-ringed tyrannulet is monotypic.

== Description ==
The bay-ringed tyrannulet is about 12 cm (4.7 in) long and weighs about 8 g (0.28 oz). The sexes have the same plumage. Adults are rufous-chestnut at the lores whose color extends to a wide eye-ring. The upper part of their face is olive and the lower part pale yellow. Their crown and upperparts are bright olive. Their wings are dusky with olive edges on the flight feathers. Their wing coverts are dusky with pale yellow tips that form a wing bar. Their tail is dusky with olive edges to the feathers. Their chin is yellow, their throat a paler yellow, and the rest of their underparts are mostly whitish with a greenish dusky tinge on the sides of the breast and flanks and yellow undertail coverts. Both sexes have a bright white iris, a pointed black bill, and bluish gray to slate legs and feet.

== Distribution and habitat ==
The bay-ringed tyrannulet is found in southeastern Brazil from southern Minas Gerais and Espírito Santo south to Santa Catarina and west into eastern Paraguay and northeastern Argentina's Misiones Province. It inhabits the interior and edges of humid evergreen forest in the lowlands and foothills. In elevation it ranges from sea level to 600 m (2,000 ft).

== Behavior ==
=== Movement ===
The bay-ringed tyrannulet is believed to be a year-round resident.

=== Feeding ===
The bay-ringed tyrannulet feeds primarily on insects and also includes small fruits in its diet. It forages actively, mostly in the forest's canopy. It typically perches horizontally on a branch, usually with its tail cocked up, and makes short sallies to snatch or hover-glean prey from leaves and twigs. It typically forages singly or in pairs and occasionally in small family groups, and often as part of a mixed-species feeding flock.

=== Breeding ===
The bay-ringed tyrannulet breeds between August and October in Argentina; its season elsewhere has not been defined. Both parents build the nest, a bag made mostly of moss with a side entrance hanging from a horizontal branch, typically between 10 and 25 m (35 and 80 ft) above the ground. The clutch size, incubation period, time to fledging, and details of parental care are not known.

=== Vocalization ===
The bay-ringed tyrannulet's song is a "rapid, almost level twittering, sounding (simplified) like twitwi--twididirit-tjutju". The twi notes are extremely high and the tjutju descends and is low pitched.

== Status ==
The IUCN originally in 1988 assessed the bay-ringed tyrannulet as Near Threatened but since March 2023 as being of Least Concern. Its population size is not known and is believed to be decreasing. It has disappeared from parts of its overall range; "its strongholds are now in Misiones, Argentina and the Serra do Mar, Brazil". "Current key threats are urbanisation, industrialisation, agricultural expansion, colonisation and associated road-building." It is found in several protected areas.
