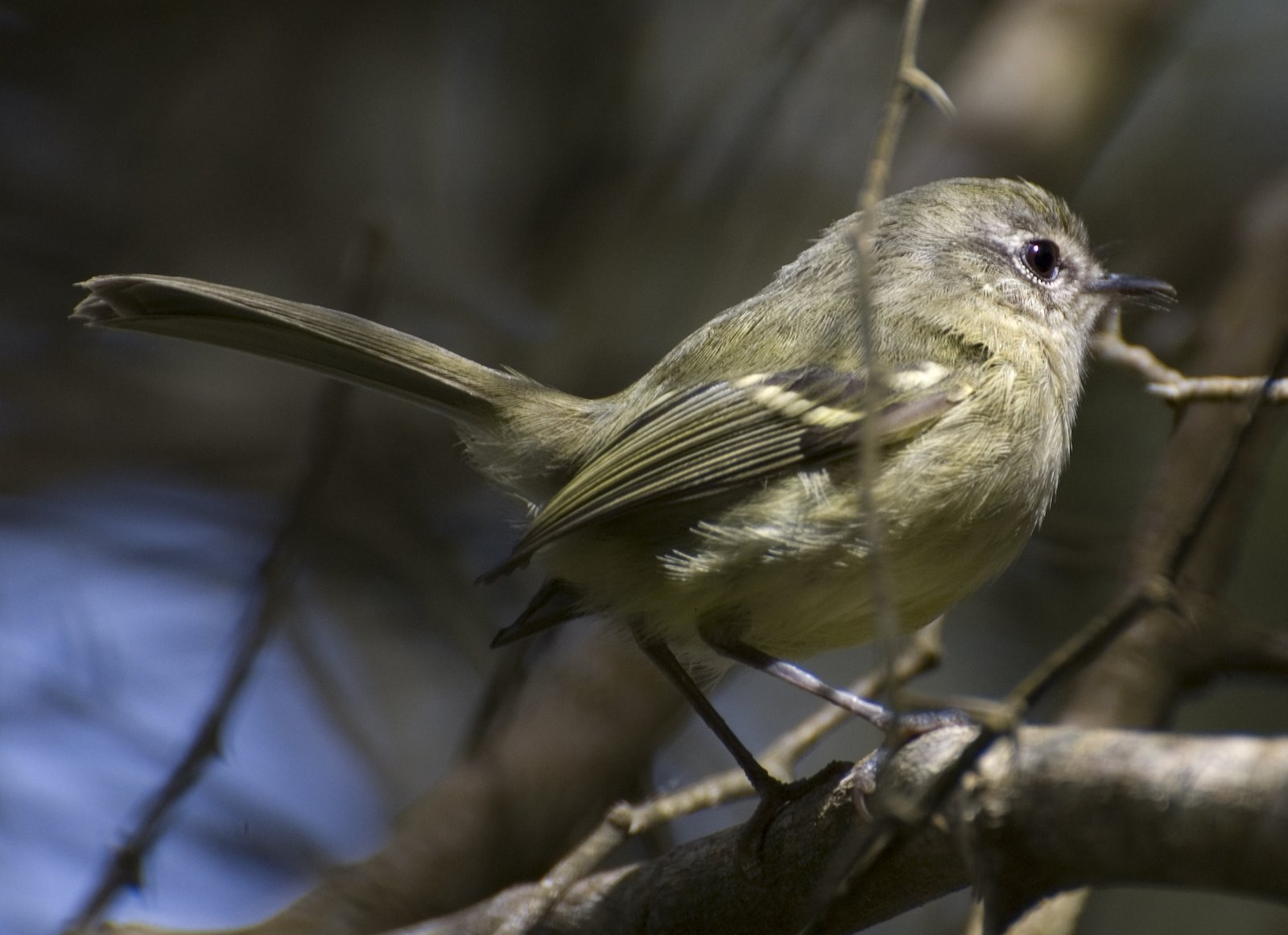
- Mottle-cheeked tyrannulet Phylloscartes ventralis

Scientific classification
- Kingdom: Animalia
- Phylum: Chordata
- Class: Aves
- Order: Passeriformes
- Family: Tyrannidae
- Genus: Phylloscartes; Cabanis & Heine, 1860

Type species
- Phylloscartes ventralis

= Phylloscartes =

Genus of birds

Phylloscartes is a genus of small birds in the family Tyrannidae. They are found in wooded habitats of Central and South America. They mainly feed on small arthropods, and most commonly take part in mixed species flocks. The mottled-cheeked tyrannulet is among the commonest birds in its range, but several other species are rare and threatened. Their plumage is predominantly green, yellow, white and grey, and many have contrasting facial patterns and wing-bars. They have thin, pointed bills, and relatively long tails. Most frequently cock their tail, perch relatively horizontally and are very active.

== Taxonomy ==
The genus Phylloscartes was introduced in 1860 by the German ornithologists Jean Cabanis and Ferdinand Heine to accommodate a single species, Muscicapa ventralis, the mottle-cheeked tyrannulet, that had been described by the Dutch zoologist Coenraad Jacob Temminck in 1824. This species becomes the type species by monotypy. The genus name combines the Ancient Greek φυλλον/phullon meaning "leaf" with σκαιρω/skairō meaning "to skip" or "to dance".

The genus Pogonotriccus has usually been merged into Phylloscartes. In 2004 John Fitzpatrick in the Handbook of the Birds of the World chose to treat Pogonotriccus as a separate genus based on the slight differences in behaviour of the birds in the two genera. Frank Gill and David Donsker then also recognised Pogonotriccus in the list of bird species that they maintain on behalf of the International Ornithological Committee. The evidence for splitting the genus is weak: a 2009 molecular phylogenetic study that included one species from Pogonotriccus and three from Phylloscartes, found that the genetic differences were small.

== Species ==
The genus contains 14 species:

| Image | Common name | Scientific name | Distribution |
|---|---|---|---|
| | Mottle-cheeked tyrannulet | Phylloscartes ventralis | eastern Andean foothills from Peru to nord-western Argentina; also southern Atlantic forest, Uruguay and northeastern Argentina |
| | Alagoas tyrannulet | Phylloscartes ceciliae | eastern Brazil |
| | Restinga tyrannulet | Phylloscartes kronei | Brazil |
| | Bahia tyrannulet | Phylloscartes beckeri | state of Bahia in eastern Brazil |
| | Panama tyrannulet | Phylloscartes flavovirens | Panama |
| | Olive-green tyrannulet | Phylloscartes virescens | Guiana, Essequibo River valley to Marajó Archipelago and northern Pará |
| | Ecuadorian tyrannulet | Phylloscartes gualaquizae | Ecuador and northern Peru |
| | Black-fronted tyrannulet | Phylloscartes nigrifrons | southern Venezuela |
| | Rufous-browed tyrannulet | Phylloscartes superciliaris | Venezuela |
| | Rufous-lored tyrannulet | Phylloscartes flaviventris | Venezuela |
| | Cinnamon-faced tyrannulet | Phylloscartes parkeri | Peru and Bolivia |
| | Minas Gerais tyrannulet | Phylloscartes roquettei | Brazil |
| | Oustalet's tyrannulet | Phylloscartes oustaleti | Atlantic forest |
| | Bay-ringed tyrannulet | Phylloscartes sylviolus | Atlantic forest |

== Conservation ==
Four species in this genus are endangered according to the IUCN. These are: Phylloscartes roquettei, Phylloscartes beckeri, Phylloscartes ceciliae and Phylloscartes lanyoni.
