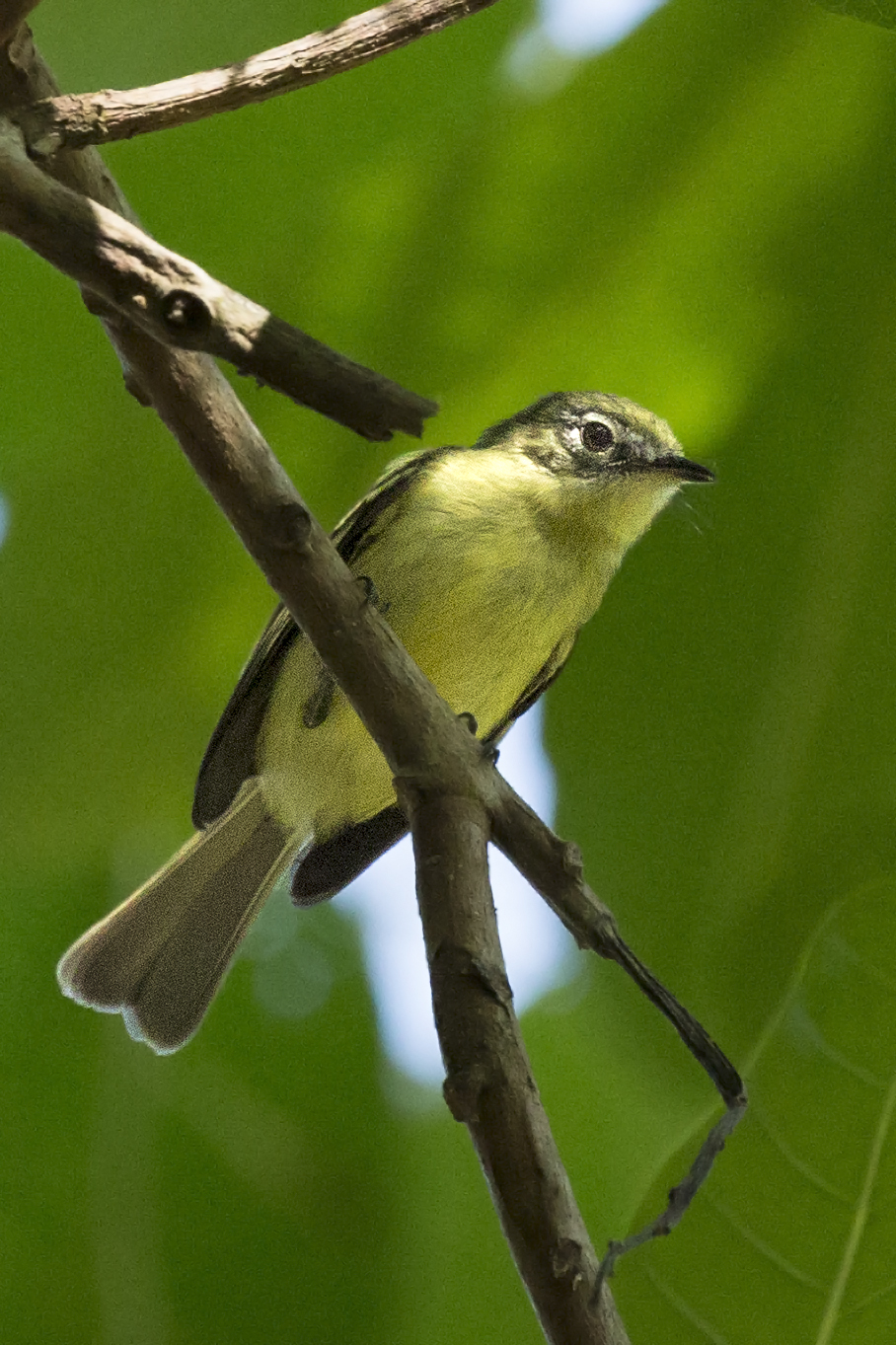

Conservation status
- Least Concern (IUCN 3.1)

Scientific classification
- Kingdom: Animalia
- Phylum: Chordata
- Class: Aves
- Order: Passeriformes
- Family: Tyrannidae
- Genus: Phylloscartes
- Species: P. flavovirens

Binomial name
- Phylloscartes flavovirens (Lawrence, 1862)

= Panama tyrannulet =

Species of bird

The Panama tyrannulet or yellow-green tyrannulet (Phylloscartes flavovirens) is a species of bird in the family Tyrannidae, the tyrant flycatchers. It is endemic to Panama.

== Taxonomy and systematics ==
The Panama tyrannulet was originally described as Leptopogon flavovirens in 1862 and by the mid twentieth century had been transferred to genus Phylloscartes. Some early twentieth century authors considered the Panama tyrannulet and what are now the olive-green tyrannulet (P. virescens) and mottle-cheeked tyrannulet (P. ventralis) as conspecific. The three are now treated by many authors as a superspecies.

The Panama tyrannulet is monotypic.

== Description ==
The Panama tyrannulet is 10 to 11 cm (3.9 to 4.3 in) long; one female weighed 8.8 g (0.31 oz). The sexes have the same plumage. Adults have grayish white lores and a white eye-ring. A dusky band through the eye continues around the yellowish ear coverts. Their upperparts are olive green with a slighter grayer crown. Their wings are dusky with yellowish olive green to yellower edges on the flight feathers. Their wing coverts are dusky with large pale yellow tips that form two wing bars. Their tail is grayish brown with pale olive green edges to the feathers. Their underparts are mostly pale yellow with a slightly whiter chin and a faint olive wash on the upper breast. Both sexes have a brown iris, a black bill, and gray or black legs and feet.

== Distribution and habitat ==
The Panama tyrannulet is known only in central and eastern Panama from the Canal Zone through Darién Province. Though it is suspected to also occur in immediately adjacent Colombia there are no records there. It inhabits the canopy of lowland evergreen forest and nearby mature secondary forest. In elevation it occurs from near sea level to 2,000 m (6,600 ft).

== Behavior ==
=== Movement ===
The Panama tyrannulet is a year-round resident.

=== Feeding ===
The Panama tyrannulet's diet has not been detailed but is known to be mostly arthropods. It forages actively and almost entirely in the forest canopy. It typically perches horizontally on a branch, often with its tail cocked up, and makes short sallies to grab or hover-glean prey from leaves and twigs. It typically forages singly or in pairs and often as part of a mixed-species feeding flock.

=== Breeding ===
Nothing is known about the Panama tyrannulet's breeding biology.

=== Vocalization ===
As of late 2024 xeno-canto had only six recordings of Panama tyrannulet vocalizations and the Cornell Lab of Ornithology's Macaulay Library had nine. What might be its call is "a very rapid dree-di-di-dít". What might be the same vocalization is described as a "short, high pweet! or ptwit!, sometimes followed by [a] short chatter of high, thin notes."

== Status ==
The IUCN has assessed the Panama tyrannulet as being of Least Concern. It has a somewhat restricted range; its estimated population of between 20,000 and 50,000 mature individuals is believed to be stable. No immediate threats have been identified. Different authors characterize it as uncommon to locally fairly common or as uncommon and patchily distributed. "Human activity has little short-term direct effect on [the] Yellow-green Tyrannulet, other than the local effects of habitat destruction".
