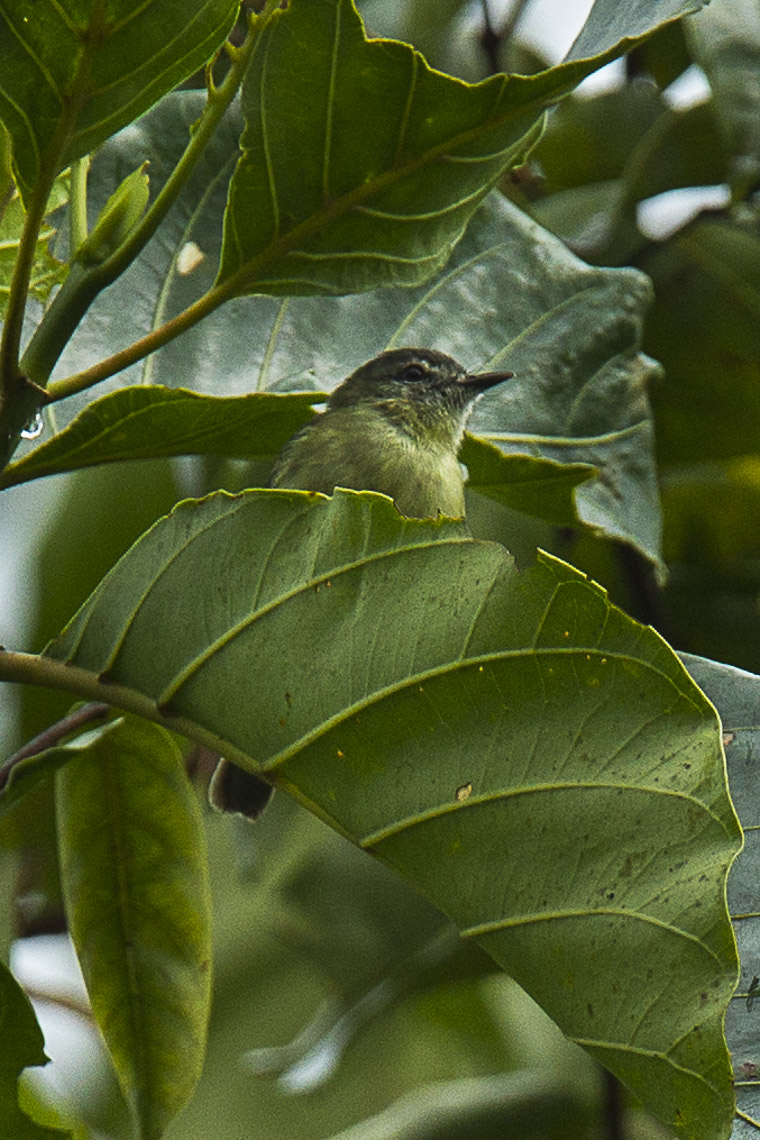

Conservation status
- Least Concern (IUCN 3.1)

Scientific classification
- Kingdom: Animalia
- Phylum: Chordata
- Class: Aves
- Order: Passeriformes
- Family: Tyrannidae
- Genus: Phylloscartes
- Species: P. gualaquizae

Binomial name
- Phylloscartes gualaquizae (Sclater, PL, 1887)

Audio

= Ecuadorian tyrannulet =

Species of bird

The Ecuadorian tyrannulet (Phylloscartes gualaquizae) is a species of bird in the family Tyrannidae, the tyrant flycatchers. It is found in Colombia, Ecuador and Peru.

== Taxonomy and systematics ==
The Ecuadorian tyrannulet was originally described as Pogonotriccus gualaquizæ and was later moved to genus Phylloscartes. Its specific epithet, currently spelled gualaquizae, is derived from Gualaquiza Canton, Ecuador, where the type specimen was collected.

The Ecuadorian tyrannulet is monotypic.

== Description ==
The Ecuadorian tyrannulet is about 11.5 cm (4.5 in) long; one male weighed 8 g (0.28 oz). The sexes have the same plumage. Adults have an indistinct whitish supercilium and eye-ring. Their face is otherwise mostly pale yellow to whitish with an indistinct blackish line around the ear coverts. Their crown is gray and the rest of their upperparts are olive. Their wings are dusky with pale yellow edges and tips on the flight feathers. Their wing coverts are dusky with whitish to pale yellow tips that form two wing bars. Their tail is olive. Their throat is whitish and the rest of their underparts are yellow with an olive wash on the breast. Both sexes have a brown iris, a black bill, and gray to blue-gray legs and feet.

== Distribution and habitat ==
The Ecuadorian tyrannulet has a disjunct distribution. One population is found from Cauca and Huila departments in southwestern Colombia south along the eastern slope of the Andes for nearly the entire length of Ecuador and possibly slightly into northwestern Peru. The other population is found in the upper valley of the Mayo River near the border of northern Peru's San Martín and Amazonas departments. The species inhabits humid montane forest where it usually is found in the canopy and on the edges. In elevation it occurs between 800 and 1,200 m (2,600 and 3,900 ft) in Colombia, mostly between 700 and 1,400 m (2,300 and 4,600 ft) in Ecuador, and between 800 and 1,500 m (2,600 and 4,900 ft) in Peru.

== Behavior ==
=== Movement ===
The Ecuadorian tyrannulet is a year-round resident.

=== Feeding ===
The Ecuadorian tyrannulet's diet has not been detailed but is known to be mostly arthropods. It forages actively and almost entirely in the forest canopy, typically 10 to 30 m (35 to 100 ft) above the ground though lower at the forest edges. It typically perches horizontally on a branch, often with its tail slightly cocked up, and makes short sallies to grab or hover-glean prey from leaves and twigs. It typically forages singly or in pairs and usually as part of a mixed-species feeding flock.

=== Breeding ===
Nothing is known about the Ecuadorian tyrannulet's breeding biology.

=== Vocalization ===
The Ecuadorian tyrannulet's day song is "a spitting, almost rattled trill, sp-i-i-i-i-i-i, that at first descends, then ascends, then descends again" and has also been written as "dzEEeerrrrEEerrrrr". Its calls include "a thin feeee" and "high teep and ptip notes".

== Status ==
The IUCN originally in 2004 assessed the Ecuadorian tyrannulet as being of Least Concern, then in 2012 as Near Threatened, and since February 2023 again as of Least Concern. It has a large range; its population size is not known and is believed to be decreasing. "The species is impacted by logging, mining, and clearance of forests for agriculture within its range". It is considered uncommon in Colombia and uncommon to locally fairly common in Ecuador, and is known from only one area in Peru.
