= Theodore A. Parker III =

American ornithologist

Theodore Albert "Ted" Parker III (April 1, 1953 – August 3, 1993) was an American ornithologist who specialized in the Neotropics. He "was widely considered the finest field birder / ornithologist that the world had ever seen."

== Biography ==
Parker grew up in Lancaster, Pennsylvania and became interested in birdwatching at an early age. In 1971 he broke the North American Big Year record (seeing more species of birds in a year than anyone before). In that year he enrolled at the University of Arizona and began to accompany ornithological expeditions to South America, particularly with Louisiana State University. He moved to Baton Rouge and was associated with LSU for the rest of his life (becoming a fanatical supporter of LSU basketball). He supported himself by leading birding tours, especially for Victor Emanuel Nature Tours, until the last few years of his life, when he went to work for Conservation International. He was killed in a plane crash in Ecuador while surveying a cloud forest; he was 40 years old.

== Identification skills ==
According to Zimmer (1993), "Voice, microhabitat, and behavior are the keys [to identification] in neotropical forests, and Ted was not only the first to recognize this (his seminal paper on foliage-gleaner identification that appeared in the April 1979 issue of Continental Birdlife should be required reading for all students of tropical birding), but also honed his discrimination of these essential cues to a finer degree than anyone else." Zimmer adds that as knowledge of these matters was limited, "[m]any field problems... took weeks of patient effort for Ted to work out for himself."

If another ornithologist played Parker a tape of an unknown bird, he could usually recognize it and could often identify other species in the background noise. He might then, by his knowledge of bird ranges, state where the tape had been made—Zimmer gives the example of "south bank of the Amazon between the Rios Madeira and Tapajos".

He could identify bird calls and songs even in the presence of many other birds, as when the bird was a member of a mixed-species flock. On more than one occasion, he identified a bird new to him by its call, since he recognized the genus and knew what species lived in the area. Once, hearing a recording of a dawn chorus in Bolivia, he realized that one of the sounds was an antwren of the genus Herpsilochmus—but since he knew all the sounds of those birds, he knew he was hearing a previously unknown species. The following year, the new species was discovered.

The scale of this knowledge is given by the presence of over two thousand bird species in the Andes and Amazon, where Parker did most of his field work; each species typically has at least three vocalizations. He kept them straight not only from each other but from the region's monkeys, amphibians, and insects as well.

== Methods ==
Don Stap describes Parker's method: walking slowly down a trail, pausing after every step, and watching and listening. In this way he gained his knowledge of both detail and "common patterns in behavior or vocalizations or community structure across the continent", which led Jon Fjeldså and Niels Krabbe to call him "by far the greatest specialist on the life histories of neotropical birds there ever was". Stap also notes that Parker generally did not shoot birds for study, a normal method of field ornithology.

When leading tours, Parker would lure flocks in by recording their sounds as he heard them and then immediately playing the tape back; he would predict where the flock would come into sight and arrange his clients to give each a good view. The flock would appear as predicted.

== Contributions ==
Parker willingly shared his knowledge with others informally, published extensively, and contributed over 10,000 recordings to the Macaulay Library of Natural Sounds at the Cornell Laboratory of Ornithology.

When he went to work for Conservation International, he conceived of an interdisciplinary program to provide scientific information in South America's conservation crises. This Rapid Assessment Program has led to the creation of many parks and reserves. Parker was doing a survey for it in western Ecuador when he was killed in a plane crash along with three others, including the botanist Alwyn Howard Gentry.

The Theodore A. Parker III Natural Area in Lancaster County, Pennsylvania, and the Parker/Gentry Award for Conservation Biology are named for him.

== Birds named after Parker ==
The following bird species have their English or scientific names commemorating Parker:

- Subtropical pygmy-owl Glaucidium parkeri
- Ash-throated antwren Herpsilochmus parkeri
- Parker's antbird Cercomacroides parkeri
- Chusquea tapaculo Scytalopus parkeri
- Cinnamon-faced tyrannulet Phylloscartes parkeri

Additionally, the following subspecies names commemorate Parker as well:

- Copper Metaltail Metallura theresiae parkeri
- Black-and-yellow silky-flycatcher Phainoptila melanoxantha parkeri
- Natterer's slaty-antshrike Thamnophilus stictocephalus parkeri
