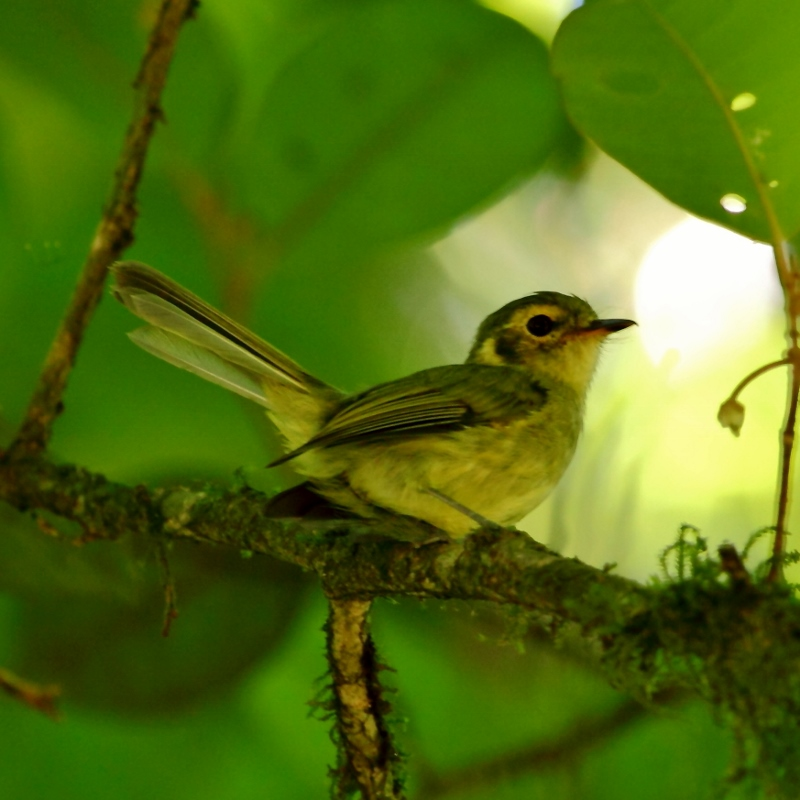
- At Tapiraí, São Paulo State, Brazil

Conservation status
- Least Concern (IUCN 3.1)

Scientific classification
- Kingdom: Animalia
- Phylum: Chordata
- Class: Aves
- Order: Passeriformes
- Family: Tyrannidae
- Genus: Phylloscartes
- Species: P. oustaleti

Binomial name
- Phylloscartes oustaleti (Sclater, PL, 1887)

= Oustalet's tyrannulet =

Species of bird in Brazil

Oustalet's tyrannulet (Phylloscartes oustaleti) is a species of bird in the family Tyrannidae, the tyrant flycatchers. It is endemic to Brazil.

== Taxonomy and systematics ==
Oustalet's tyrannulet is monotypic.

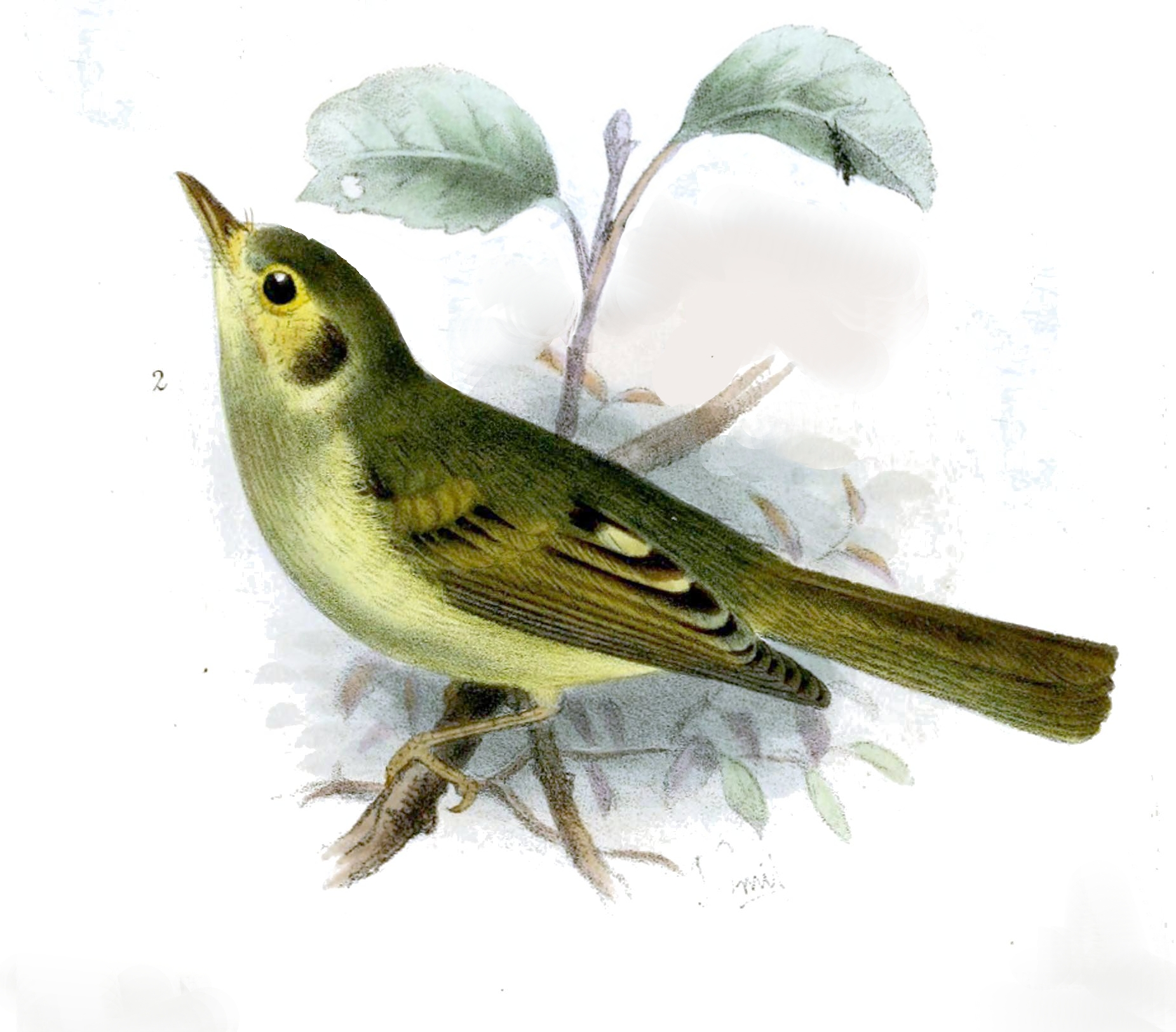
Phylloscartes oustaleti Smit 1887

== Description ==
Oustalet's tyrannulet is about 12 cm (4.7 in) long and weighs 9.4 to 10.5 g (0.33 to 0.37 oz). The sexes have the same plumage. Adults have yellowish lores whose color extends to a wide eye-ring. Their face is otherwise bright yellow with a blackish line through the eye that continues as a crescent around the ear coverts. Their crown and upperparts are olive. Their wings are dusky olive with yellowish olive edges on the flight feathers. Their wing coverts are dusky with yellowish tips that form two wing bars. Their tail is olive. Their underparts are yellow with a heavy wash of olive on the breast. Both sexes have a brown iris, a long, pointed, black bill, and gray legs and feet.

== Distribution and habitat ==
Oustalet's tyrannulet is found along a narrow band in southeastern Brazil from southern Bahia south to eastern Santa Catarina. It inhabits humid forest in the subtropical and tropical zones. It primarily is found in the forest interior and only occasionally at its borders. In elevation it ranges between 500 and 900 m (1,600 and 3,000 ft).

== Behavior ==
=== Movement ===
Oustalet's tyrannulet is a year-round resident.

=== Feeding ===
Oustalet's tyrannulet feeds primarily on insects and also other arthropods like spiders in its diet. It forages actively, mostly in the forest's sub-canopy and canopy. It typically perches horizontally on a branch, usually with its tail cocked up sometimes to the vertical, and makes short sallies to snatch or hover-glean prey from leaves and twigs. It typically forages in pairs or small family groups and almost always as part of a mixed-species feeding flock.

=== Breeding ===
Oustalet's tyrannulet is thought to breed mostly between September and December. Its nest is a dome made from plant fibers and moss with a side entrance and lined with seed down. One was placed about 2.3 m (8 ft) above the ground and another about 4 m (13 ft) up. The clutch size, incubation period, time to fledging, and details of parental care are not known.

=== Vocalization ===
The song of Oustalet's tyrannulet is an "energetic, high, nasal tueu-wí-tjeu-wíja" and its call a "short trrrri". It also makes a trill of "small tek notes".

== Status ==
The IUCN originally in 1988 assessed Oustalet's tyrannulet as Near Threatened but since March 2023 as being of Least Concern. It has a large range; its population size is not known and is believed to be decreasing. "Current key threats are urbanisation, industrialization, agricultural expansion, mining and road-building." It is considered locally uncommon to fairly common and occurs in several protected areas.
