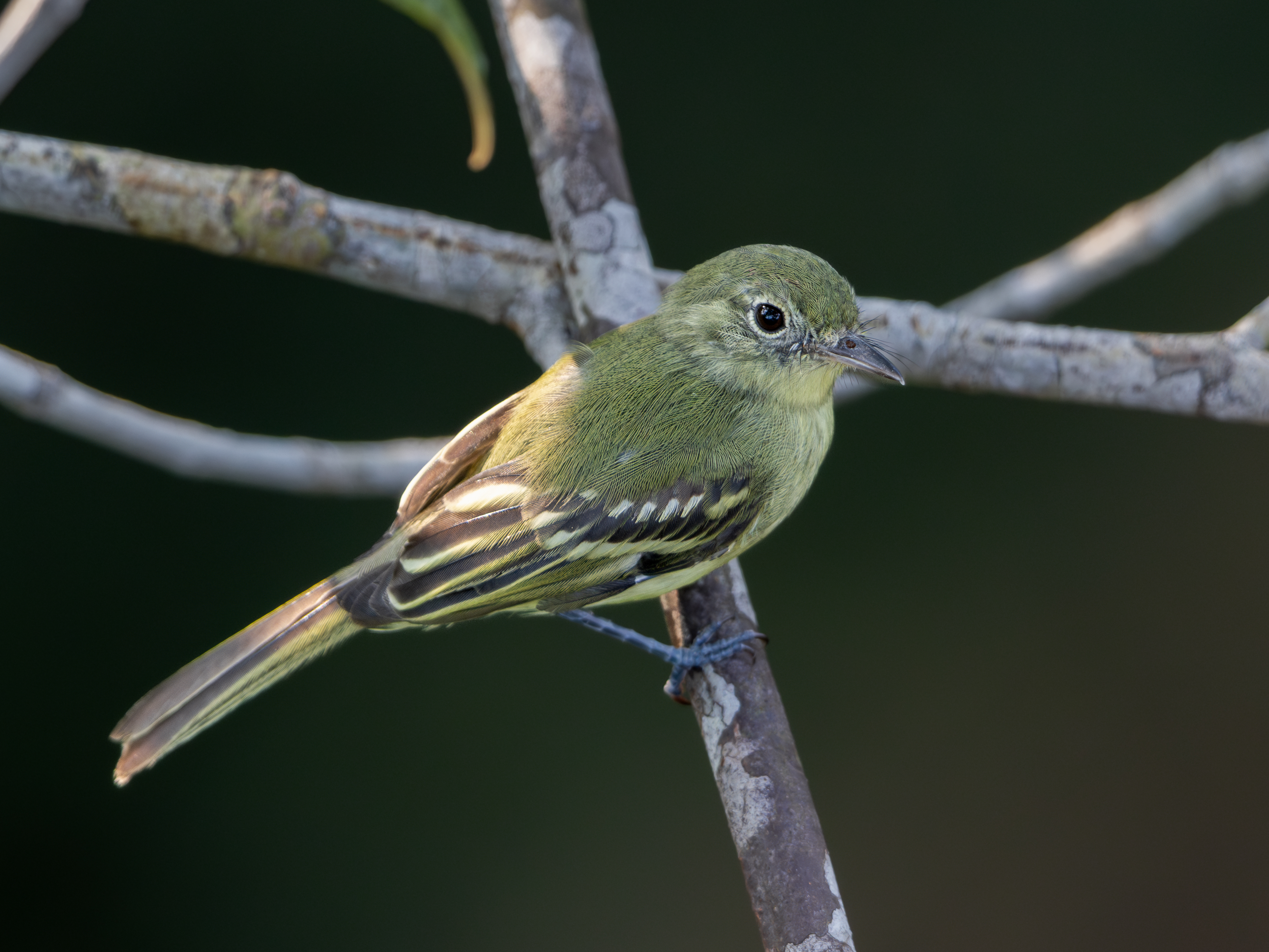

Conservation status
- Least Concern (IUCN 3.1)

Scientific classification
- Kingdom: Animalia
- Phylum: Chordata
- Class: Aves
- Order: Passeriformes
- Family: Tyrannidae
- Genus: Phylloscartes
- Species: P. virescens

Binomial name
- Phylloscartes virescens Todd, 1925

= Olive-green tyrannulet =

Species of bird

The olive-green tyrannulet (Phylloscartes virescens) is a species of bird in the family Tyrannidae, the tyrant flycatchers. It is found in Brazil, French Guiana, Guyana, and Suriname.

== Taxonomy and systematics ==
Some early twentieth century authors considered the olive-green tyrannulet and what are now the Panama tyrannulet (P. flavovirens) and mottle-cheeked tyrannulet (P. ventralis) as conspecific. The three are now treated by many authors as a superspecies.

The olive-green tyrannulet is monotypic.

== Description ==
The olive-green tyrannulet is about 12 cm (4.7 in) long. The sexes have the same plumage. Adults have black lores and a faint yellowish white area behind the lores that connects with a prominent yellowish eye-ring. Their face is otherwise yellowish green. Their crown and upperparts are olive. Their wings are dusky with thin yellow edges on the flight feathers. Their wing coverts are dusky with medium yellow tips that form two wing bars. Their tail is olive. Their underparts are medium yellow. Both sexes have a brown iris, a long, pointed, black bill, and gray legs and feet.

== Distribution and habitat ==
The olive-green tyrannulet is found in northeastern Brazil and the Guianas. It range is mostly north of the Amazon River between the Negro river and the state of Amapá, though there are also a few records south of the Amazon. The species mostly inhabits humid primary evergreen forest but also occurs in mature secondary forest. In elevation it occurs below about 500 m (1,600 ft).

== Behavior ==
=== Movement ===
The olive-green tyrannulet is a year-round resident.

=== Feeding ===
The olive-green tyrannulet feeds on arthropods. It forages actively and almost entirely in the forest canopy. It typically perches horizontally on a branch, sometimes with its tail slightly cocked up, and makes short sallies to grab or hover-glean prey from leaves and twigs. It typically forages singly or in pairs and usually as part of a mixed-species feeding flock.

=== Breeding ===
The olive-green tyrannulet is thought to breed between December and March. Nothing else is known about its breeding biology.

=== Vocalization ===
Both sexes of the olive-green tyrannulet sing "a series of high, reedy notes preceded by louder, exclamatory note, 'Queet!-peet-peet-peet-peet' ".

== Status ==
The IUCN has assessed the olive-green tyrannulet as being of Least Concern. Its population size is not known and is believed to be decreasing. No immediate threats have been identified. It is considered rare and "perhaps often overlooked". The habitat in much of its range is undisturbed.
