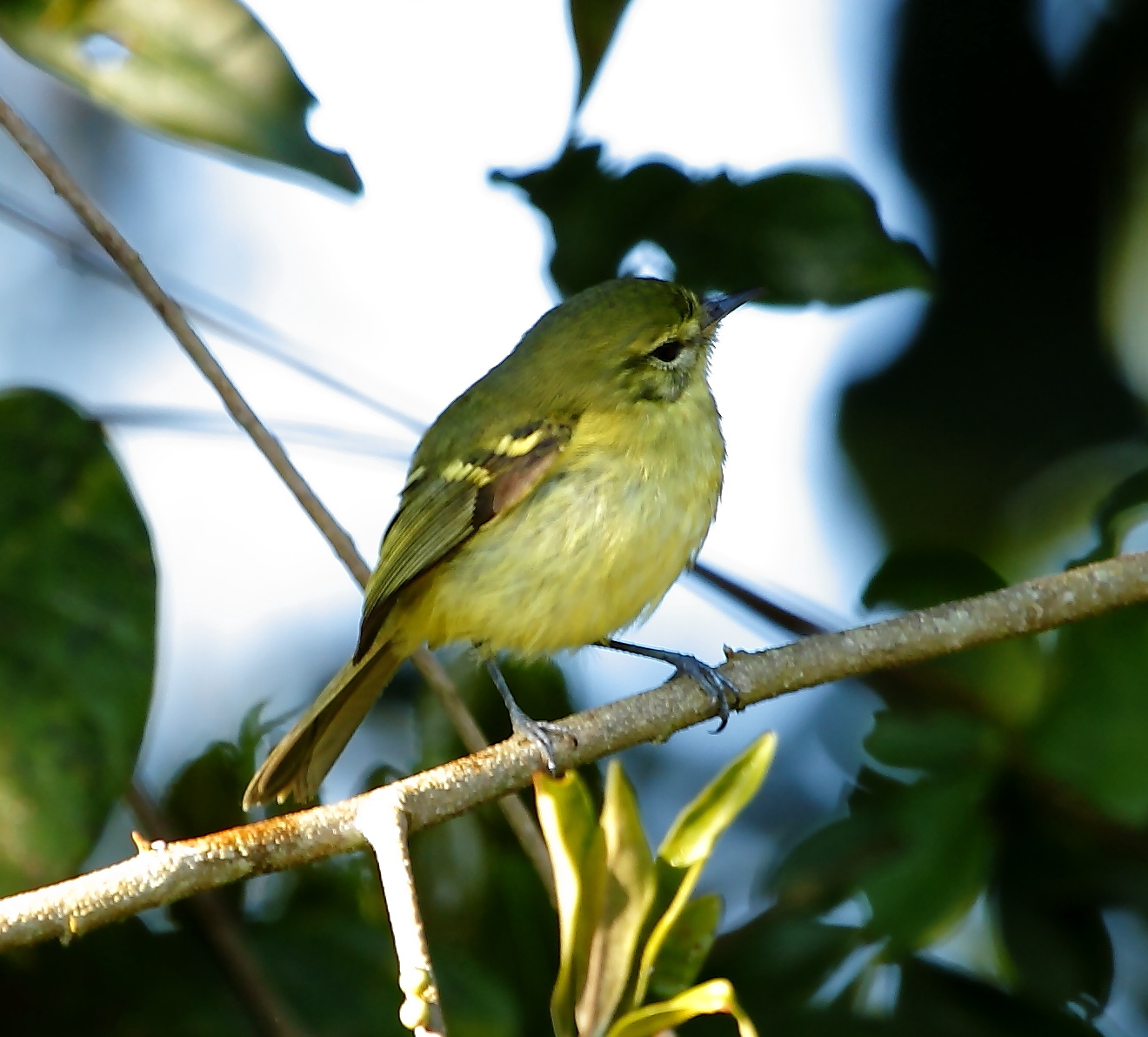
- At Joinville, Santa Catarina state, Brazil

Conservation status
- Least Concern (IUCN 3.1)

Scientific classification
- Kingdom: Animalia
- Phylum: Chordata
- Class: Aves
- Order: Passeriformes
- Family: Tyrannidae
- Genus: Phylloscartes
- Species: P. kronei

Binomial name
- Phylloscartes kronei Willis & Oniki, 1992

= Restinga tyrannulet =

Species of bird

The restinga tyrannulet (Phylloscartes kronei) is a species of bird in the family Tyrannidae, the tyrant flycatchers. It is endemic to Brazil.

== Taxonomy and systematics ==
The restinga tyrannulet is monotypic.

The first known specimen of the restinga tyrannulet was collected in 1898 but was misidentified as a mottle-cheeked tyrannulet (P. ventralis). Willis and Oniki corrected the error in their formal description of the new species. They assigned the specific epithet kronei in honor of Ricardo Krone, the Brazilian zoologist who collected the 1898 specimen.

== Description ==
The restinga tyrannulet is about 12 cm (4.7 in) long and weighs 7.25 to 10 g (0.26 to 0.35 oz). The sexes have the same plumage. Adults have a thin yellow supercilium, a yellow broken eye-ring, and a dusky line through the eye that continues to the rear and sweeps around the mottled dusky and yellowish ear coverts. Their crown, nape, back, and rump are greenish olive that is slightly browner on the crown. Their wings are dusky with yellowish outer webs on the flight feathers. Their wing coverts have yellow tips that form two wing bars. Their tail is dusky olive with thin greenish edges on the feathers. Their chin and throat are pale yellow. The rest of their underparts are medium yellow that is brightest on the belly and has faint greenish mottling on the breast and flanks. Both sexes have a brown iris, a black bill with a pale base to the mandible, and gray legs and feet.

== Distribution and habitat ==
The restinga tyrannulet is found in southeastern Brazil along a narrow coastal band from the floodplain of the Ribeira River in southern São Paulo state south into northeastern Rio Grande do Sul. Its primary habitat is restinga, which is low-stature woodlands on coastal sand ridges. It also occurs in adjacent evergreen forest, secondary forest, and riverside forest. In elevation it is found almost entirely very near sea level but locally occurs as high as 600 m (2,000 ft).

== Behavior ==
=== Movement ===
The restinga tyrannulet is a year-round resident.

=== Feeding ===
The restinga tyrannulet feeds primarily on arthropods and also includes fruits in its diet. It forages actively, usually from the forest's understory up to about 15 m (50 ft) above the ground. It typically perches on a sloping branch and makes short sallies to grab prey from leaves and twigs. It typically forages singly or in pairs and rarely joins mixed-species feeding flocks.

=== Breeding ===
The restinga tyrannulet breeds between September and January. Females take about 19 days to build the nest, a closed ball of moss and spider web lined with dry grass and seed fluff. It typically is in or suspended from a branch fork between about 0.7 and 3 m (2 and 10 ft) above the ground. The clutch size is two or three eggs. Females alone incubate, for about 12 days, though males remain near the nest. The time to fledging is not known. Both parents provision nestlings.

=== Vocalization ===
The restinga tyrannulet's song is a "very high, fast, twittering series" written as sit-it-it-it-it-it-it-it-it-it-sitit-sitit. Its call is a "very high 'swee' ".

== Status ==
The IUCN originally in 1994 assessed the restinga tyrannulet as Vulnerable and since August 2019 as being of Least Concern. Its range is estimated at 58,500 km^{2} (22,600 sq mi) but it is thought to actually occupy only about 5,400 km^{2} (2,100 sq mi) within that range. Its estimated population of between 2500 and 10,000 mature individuals is believed to be decreasing. "Within its range, suitable habitat is rapidly cleared for beachfront dwellings and tourist developments, notably on Ilha Comprida, and future pressure on restingas are likely to be great. Deliberately or accidentally started fires are also a threat." The species is known to occur in at least 11 protected areas.
