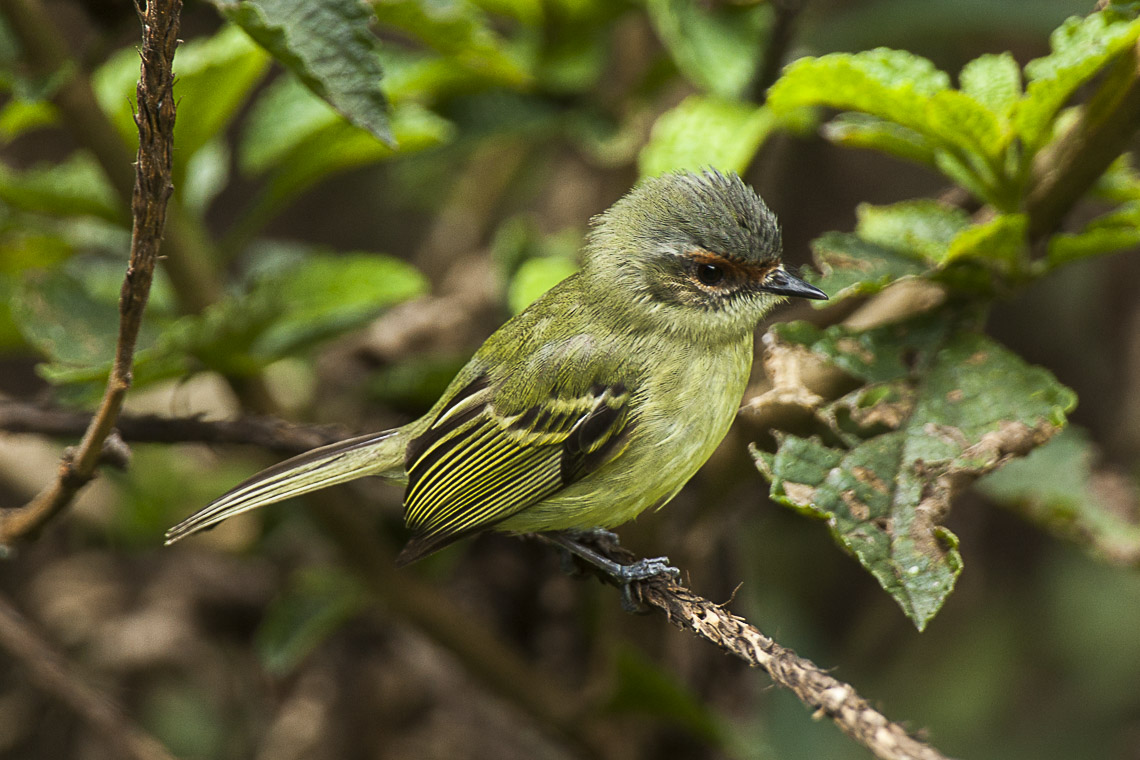
- At Manú National Park, Peru.

Conservation status
- Least Concern (IUCN 3.1)

Scientific classification
- Kingdom: Animalia
- Phylum: Chordata
- Class: Aves
- Order: Passeriformes
- Family: Tyrannidae
- Genus: Phylloscartes
- Species: P. parkeri

Binomial name
- Phylloscartes parkeri Fitzpatrick & Stotz, 1997

= Cinnamon-faced tyrannulet =

Species of bird

The cinnamon-faced tyrannulet (Phylloscartes parkeri) is a species of bird in the family Tyrannidae, the tyrant flycatchers. It is found in Bolivia and Peru.

== Taxonomy and systematics ==
The cinnamon-faced tyrannulet is monotypic.

The cinnamon-faced tyrannulet is the last of four species of genus Phylloscartes described in the late twentieth century. It was preceded by the Alagoas tyrannulet (P. ceciliae) in 1987, the restinga tyrannulet (P. kronei) in 1992, and the Bahia tyrannulet (P. beckeri) in 1995. The four were the first members of the genus described since the Minas Gerais tyrannulet (P. roquettei) in 1928, and as of late 2024 no others had been described since.

The first known specimen of the cinnamon-faced tyrannulet was collected in 1899 but was misidentified as a rufous-lored tyrannulet (P. flaviventris). When it was recognized as a separate species the two were suggested to form a superspecies.

The cinnamon-faced tyrannulet's specific epithet honors American ornithologist Theodore A. Parker III for his "skill in the field [and] unbridled enthusiasm for birds and conservation".

== Description ==
The cinnamon-faced tyrannulet is about 11.5 cm (4.5 in) long; six individuals weighed between 7.6 and 9.1 g (0.27 and 0.32 oz). The sexes have the same plumage. Adults have a cinnamon-rufous forecrown, lores, and eye-ring and a faint white streak behind the eye. A dusky band arcs above, behind, and under the pale cinnamon-buff ear coverts. Their crown is gray with a light olive wash and their back and rump are olive-green. Their wings are dusky to blackish with bright yellowish olive-green edges on the flight feathers. Their wing coverts have large pale yellowish olive-green tips that form two wing bars. Their tail is dusky with yellowish olive-green edges to the feathers. Their chin is whitish with pale yellow edges and their throat darker yellow. Their breast and flanks are yellow with wide dull olive-green streaks. Their belly and undertail coverts are unmarked pale yellow. Both sexes have a dark brown iris, a long black bill, and medium gray legs and feet.

== Distribution and habitat ==
The cinnamon-faced tyrannulet is found in a narrow band along the eastern slope of the Andes from Peru's Department of Huánuco south to southwestern Beni Department in Bolivia. It inhabits intact humid montane evergreen forest at elevations between 650 and 1,550 m (2,100 and 5,100 ft) in Peru and perhaps lower in Bolivia.

== Behavior ==
=== Movement ===
The cinnamon-faced tyrannulet is a year-round resident.

=== Feeding ===
The cinnamon-faced tyrannulet feeds primarily on arthropods . It forages actively, usually in the forest canopy. It typically perches horizontally on a branch, sometimes with its tail slightly cocked up, and makes short sallies to grab and hover-glean prey from leaves and twigs. It typically forages in pairs or small (family?) groups and almost always as part of a mixed-species feeding flock.

=== Breeding ===
The cinnamon-faced tyrannulet is presumed to breed primarily between August and November. Its one known nest was a globe made of moss about 6 m (20 ft) above the ground. Nothing else is known about the species' breeding biology.

=== Vocalization ===
The cinnamon-faced tyrannulet's song is "a high, springy, laughing chatter that quavers, rising slightly: chi chi tchrrEEEEeeeEEEEEew" and its call is "a high tchew".

== Status ==
The IUCN has assessed the cinnamon-faced tyrannulet as being of Least Concern. It has a large range; its population size is not known and is believed to be decreasing. No immediate threats have been identified. It is considered locally fairly common and occurs in several protected areas in Peru. However, it "apparently is restricted to undisturbed forest...which leaves it particularly vulnerable to habitat degradation".
