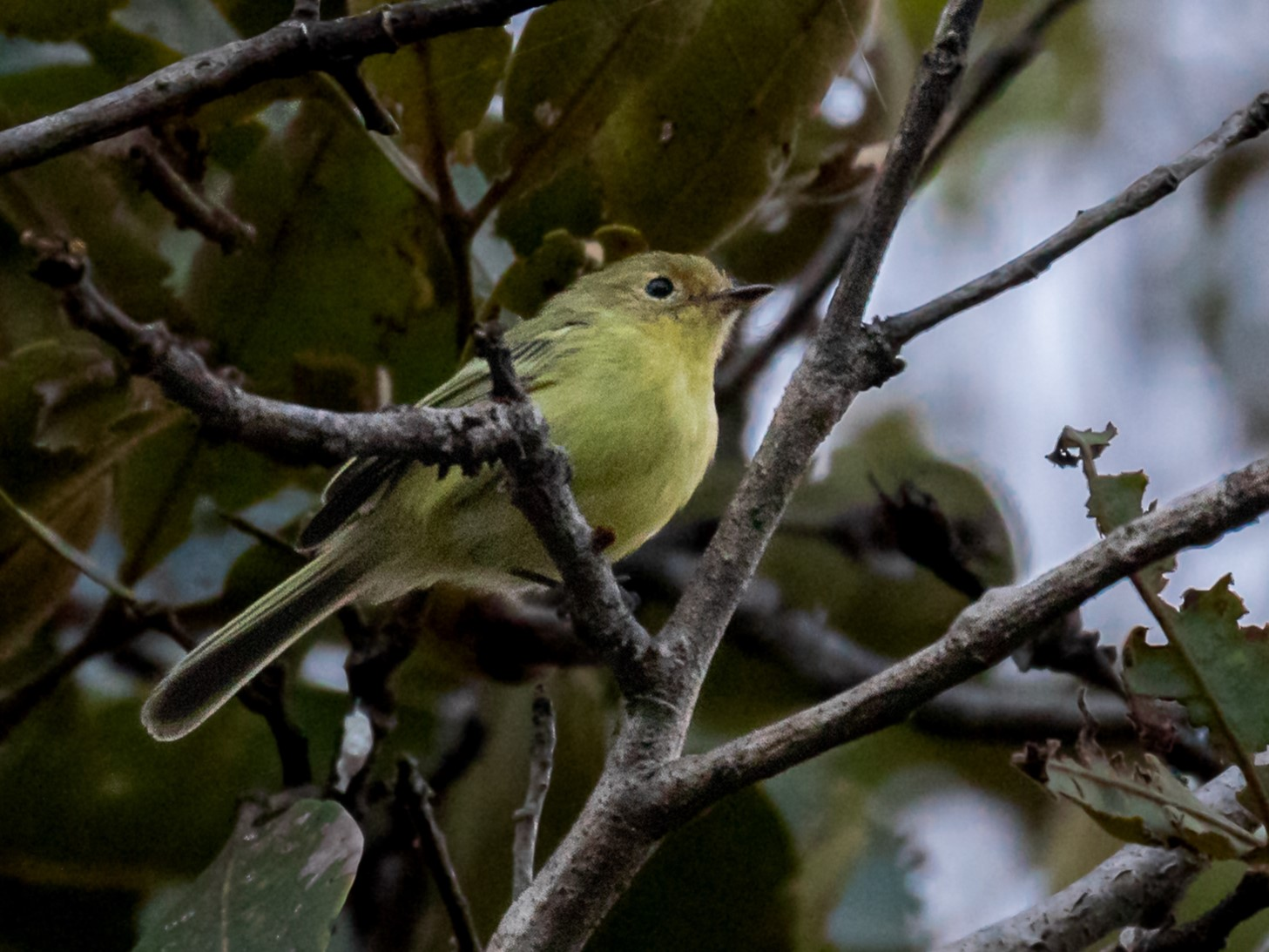

Conservation status
- Near Threatened (IUCN 3.1)

Scientific classification
- Kingdom: Animalia
- Phylum: Chordata
- Class: Aves
- Order: Passeriformes
- Family: Tyrannidae
- Genus: Phylloscartes
- Species: P. roquettei

Binomial name
- Phylloscartes roquettei Snethlage, 1928

= Minas Gerais tyrannulet =

Species of bird in Brazil

The Minas Gerais tyrannulet (Phylloscartes roquettei) is a near-threatened species of bird in the family Tyrannidae, the tyrant flycatchers.

== Taxonomy and systematics ==
The Minas Gerais tyrannulet is monotypic.

Though relationships among members of Phylloscartes have not been fully resolved, it appears that the Minas Gerais tyrannulet's closest relatives are the rufous-lored tyrannulet (P. flaviventris) and the cinnamon-faced tyrannulet (P. parkeri).

== Description ==
The Minas Gerais tyrannulet is about 12 cm (4.7 in) long and weighs about 8 g (0.28 oz). The sexes have the same plumage. Adults have a rufous to ochraceous wash on the forecrown, lores, and often the forehead. They have an indistinct yellowish supercilium and a whitish eye-ring. Their face is otherwise yellowish with a faint brownish crescent around the ear coverts. Their crown and upperparts are bright olive. Their wings are dusky with white to bright olive-yellow edges on the flight feathers. Their wing coverts are dusky with pale yellow to whitish tips that form two wing bars. Their tail is dusky with white to bright olive-yellow edges on the feathers. Their underparts are bright lemon yellow with a "vest" of diffuse olive streaks on the breast and sides. Both sexes have a dark brown iris, a black bill with an ashy to pale pinkish base to the mandible, and brownish gray to slate legs and feet.

== Distribution and habitat ==
The Minas Gerais tyrannulet was long known only in eastern Brazil's Minas Gerais state, but since 2008 has been found in Bahia and since 2013 in Goiás. It inhabits a variety of landscapes including tropical dry forest, gallery forest, and tall trees in deciduous scrublands along watercourses.

== Behavior ==
=== Movement ===
The Minas Gerais tyrannulet is believed to be a year-round resident.

=== Feeding ===
The Minas Gerais tyrannulet feeds primarily on arthropods. It forages actively, mostly from the forest's mid-story to its canopy though it will descend to within about 2 m (6.6 ft) of the ground in dense cover. It typically perches horizontally on a branch, usually with its tail slightly cocked up, and makes short sallies to snatch or hover-glean prey from leaves and twigs. It also occasionally gleans while perched. It typically forages in pairs or small family groups and only rarely as part of a mixed-species feeding flock.

=== Breeding ===
The Minas Gerais tyrannulet breeds between October and February. Both sexes build the nest, a globe of thin rootlets, twigs, lichens, grasses, and dead leaves with a side entrance. The nest is typically between about 8 and 12 m (25 and 40 ft) above the ground. The clutch size, incubation period, time to fledging, and details of parental care are not known.

=== Vocalization ===
The Minas Gerais tyrannulet's song is a "low, rattling tjuddrrr-twit (1st part slightly descending, 2nd part as a sort of full stop)".

== Status ==
The IUCN originally in 1988 assessed the Minas Gerais tyrannulet as Threatened, then in 1994 as Endangered and in 2000 as Critically Endangered. In 2009 it was reassessed as Endangered as its larger range was discovered. The bird was then downlisted to Near Threatened in 2025. It still, however, has a restricted range and its estimated population of between 2500 and 9,999 mature individuals is believed to be decreasing.
