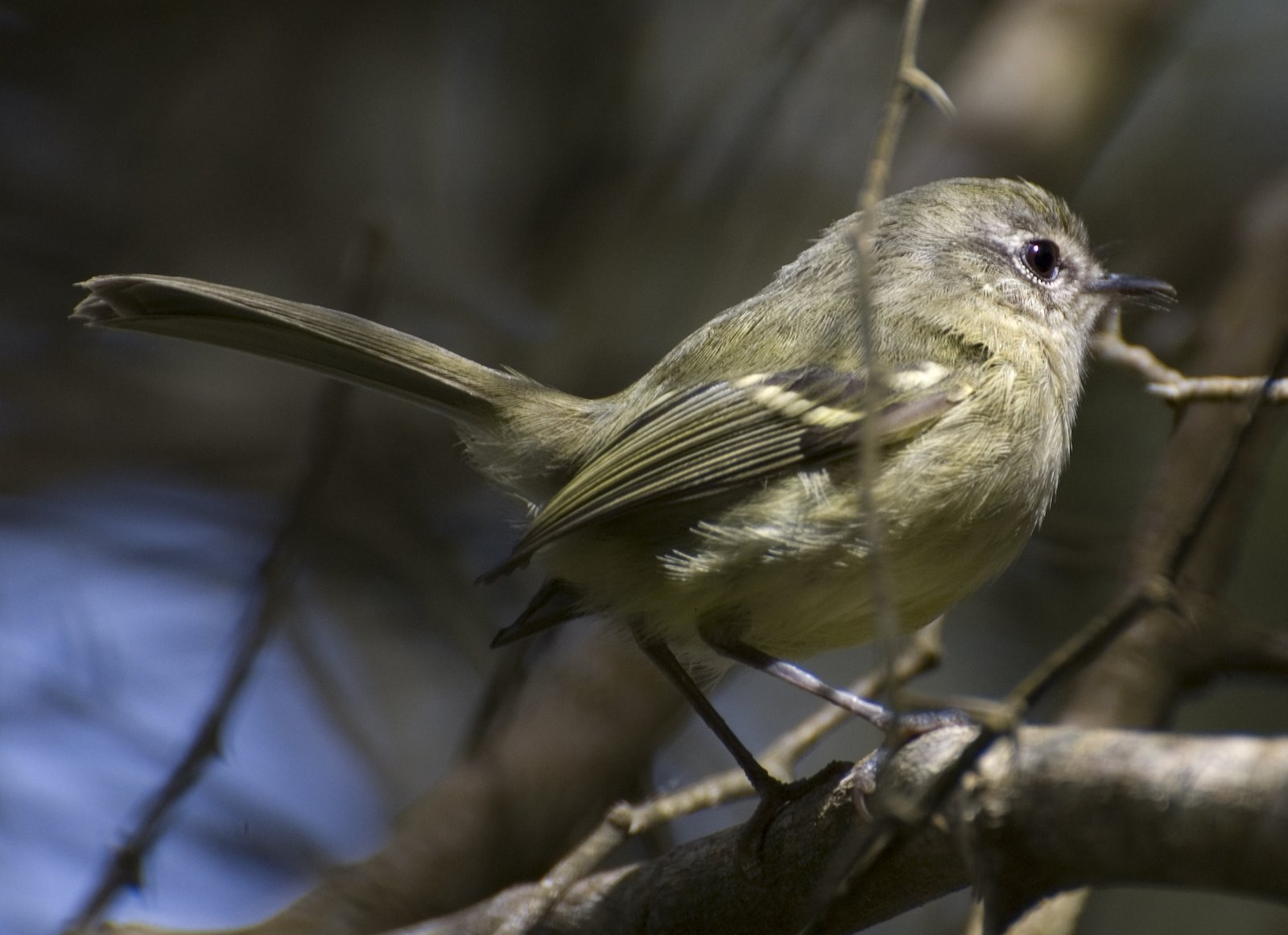

Conservation status
- Least Concern (IUCN 3.1)

Scientific classification
- Kingdom: Animalia
- Phylum: Chordata
- Class: Aves
- Order: Passeriformes
- Family: Tyrannidae
- Genus: Phylloscartes
- Species: P. ventralis

Binomial name
- Phylloscartes ventralis (Temminck, 1824)

= Mottle-cheeked tyrannulet =

Species of bird

The mottle-cheeked tyrannulet (Phylloscartes ventralis) is a generally common, small species of bird in the family Tyrannidae, the tyrant flycatchers. It is found in Argentina, Bolivia, Brazil, Paraguay, Peru, and Uruguay.

== Taxonomy and systematics ==
Some early twentieth century authors considered the mottle-cheeked tyrannulet and what are now the Panama tyrannulet (P. flavovirens) and olive-green tyrannulet (P. virescens) as conspecific. The three are now treated by many authors as a superspecies.

The mottle-cheeked tyrannulet has three subspecies, the nominate P. v. ventralis (Temminck, 1824), P. v. angustirostris (d'Orbigny & Lafresnaye, 1837), and P. v. tucumanus (Zimmer, JT, 1940). Some authors believe that the "recognition of subspecies may be unwarranted".

== Description ==
The mottle-cheeked tyrannulet is about 12 cm (4.7 in) long and weighs about 9 g (0.32 oz). The sexes have the same plumage, and the subspecies also have essentially the same plumage as well. Adults have a short thin whitish supercilium, an indistinct broken whitish eye-ring, a dusky line through the eye, a wide whitish and dusky crescent below the eye, a dusky "moustache", and the eponymous whitish and dusky mottled cheeks. Their crown, nape, back, and rump are dark olive. Their wings are dusky with bright olive-yellow outer webs at the base of the flight feathers. Their wing coverts have pale yellow to yellow tips that form two wing bars. Their tail is dusky with bright olive-yellow outer webs at the base of the feathers. Their chin and upper throat are whitish. The rest of their underparts vary from olive grayish to mostly yellowish with faint olive markings. Their belly and undertail coverts can be a paler yellow. Both sexes of all subspecies have a dark brown iris, a long, flat, pointed black bill with a pinkish to yellowish base to the mandible, and slate to bluish gray legs and feet.

== Distribution and habitat ==
The mottle-cheeked tyrannulet has a disjunct distribution, with each subspecies separate from the others. Subspecies P. v. angustirostris forms one population. It is found on the eastern slope of the Andes from northern Peru's Amazonas Department south through the country into Bolivia's La Paz and Cochabamba departments. P. v. tucumanus is found in northwestern Argentina from Jujuy Province south into Tucumán and Catamarca provinces. The nominate P. v. ventralis has the largest range. It is found from Minas Gerais state in southeastern Brazil southwest through Mato Grosso do Sul into eastern Paraguay and south throughout Uruguay and northeastern Argentina as far as Entre Ríos Province.

In the Andes the mottle-cheeked tyrannulet primarily inhabits montane evergreen forest and to a lesser extent higher ridgetop cloudforest and lower tropical forest. In elevation it ranges between 1,000 and 2,400 m (3,300 and 7,900 ft). In Brazil, Paraguay, Uruguay, and northeastern Argentina it occurs in montane forest and also tropical forest, gallery forest, and temperate forest dominated by Araucaria or Podocarpus. There it is mostly found below 1,500 m (4,900 ft) but locally ranges somewhat higher.

== Behavior ==
=== Movement ===
All populations of the mottle-cheeked tyrannulet are year-round residents.

=== Feeding ===
The mottle-cheeked tyrannulet feeds mostly on arthropods and includes a few fruits in its diet. It forages actively, usually from the forest's mid-story to its canopy but sometimes lower in dense understory. It perches horizontally, sometimes with its tail slightly cocked up, and makes short sallies to grab or hover-glean prey from leaves and twigs. Its wings make a whir during the sallies. It typically forages singly or in pairs and sometimes joins mixed-species feeding flocks.

=== Breeding ===
The mottle-cheeked tyrannulet's breeding season has not been fully defined. In Brazil it breeds between August and December and in Argentina from October to December. In Peru its season includes November. A nest of subspecies P. v. tucumanus was a ball made from plant fibers, dead leaves, lichen, and moss; it had a side entrance with a small "roof". A nest of P. v. angustirostris was similar but made entirely of "Spanish moss" (Tillandsia usneoides). Nests have been noted as suspended from a horizontal branch between 1.5 and 7 m (5 and 23 ft) above the ground. The clutch is three eggs and the female alone incubates. The incubation period is about 18 days and fledging occurs about 17 days after hatch. Both parents provision the nestlings and remove fecal sacs.

=== Vocalization ===
The mottle-cheeked tyrannulet's song has been described as "a descending, accelerating rattle tchep tik tik-teer'r'r'r' and its call as "weak, sneezy, metallic tchee or tchep notes". Another description of is song is a "very high, mainly level pitched, twittering trill, which starts hesitantly, accelerates, then slows down at the end with some very sharp, very high notes".

== Status ==
The IUCN has assessed the mottle-cheeked tyrannulet as being of Least Concern. It has a very large range; its population size is not known and is believed to be decreasing. No immediate threats have been identified. It is considered fairly common to common.
