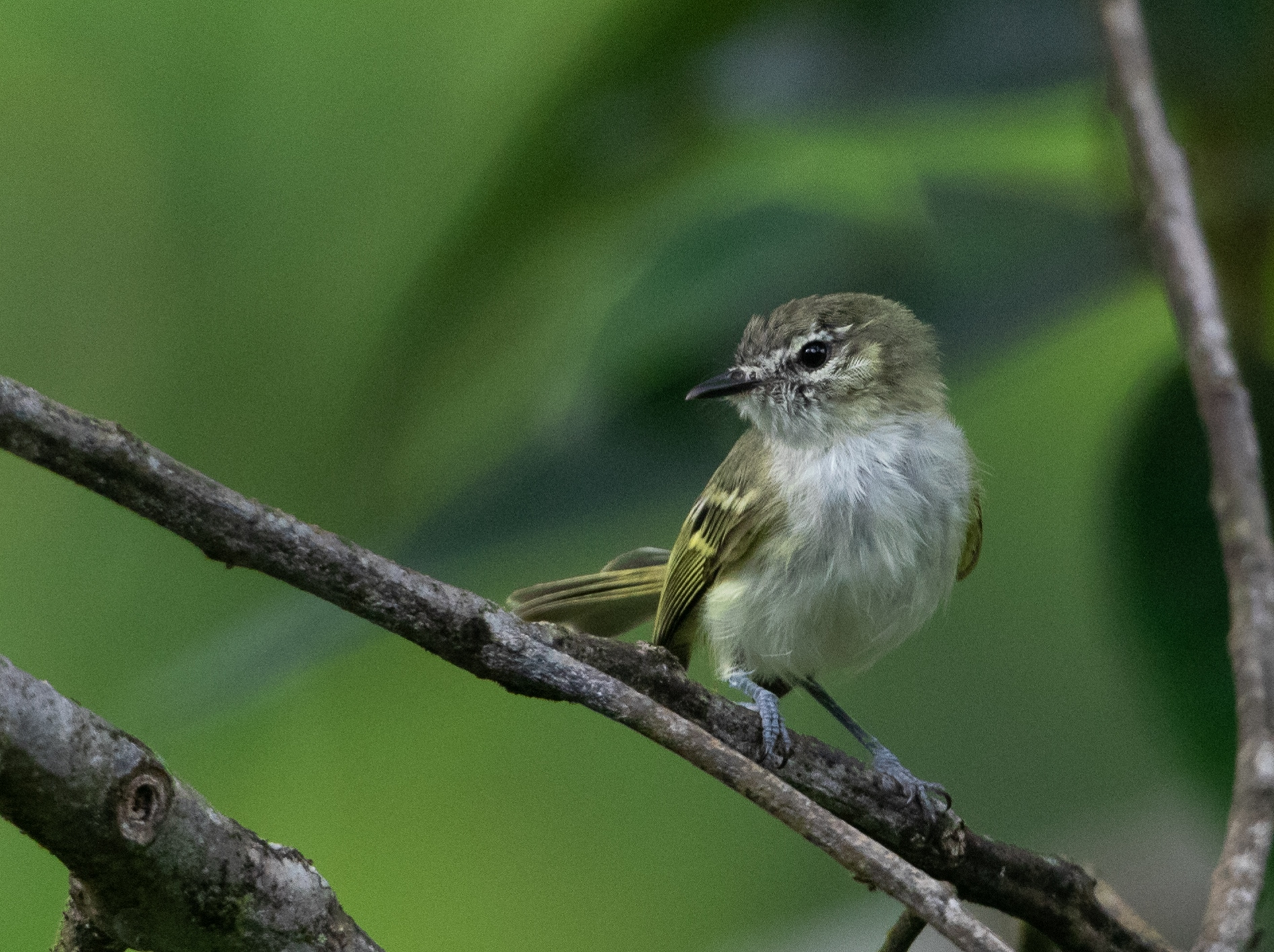

Conservation status
- Critically Endangered (IUCN 3.1)

Scientific classification
- Kingdom: Animalia
- Phylum: Chordata
- Class: Aves
- Order: Passeriformes
- Family: Tyrannidae
- Genus: Phylloscartes
- Species: P. ceciliae

Binomial name
- Phylloscartes ceciliae Teixeira, 1987

= Alagoas tyrannulet =

Species of bird

The Alagoas tyrannulet (Phylloscartes ceciliae) is a Critically Endangered species of bird in the family Tyrannidae, the tyrant flycatchers. It is endemic to Brazil.

== Taxonomy and systematics ==
The Alagoas tyrannulet is monotypic. It and the bay-ringed tyrannulet (P. sylviolus) appear to be sister species.

Dante Martins Teixeira, who formally described the species, called it the "long-tailed tyrannulet". He gave it the specific epithet ceciliae in memory of his late wife Cecelia Torres.

== Description ==
The Alagoas tyrannulet is 11 to 13 cm (4.3 to 5.1 in) long; five individuals weighed 6.8 to 8.4 g (0.24 to 0.30 oz). The sexes have the same plumage. Adults have a thin whitish supercilium and an ashy blackish streak through the eye that continues to the rear and sweeps around the whitish ear coverts. Their crown, nape, back, and rump are dark olive green. Their wings are blackish olive with thin yellowish green edges to the flight feathers. Their wing coverts have wide greenish yellow tips that form two distinct wing bars. Their long tail is blackish with thin yellowish green edges to the feathers. Their throat and breast are whitish with a dark green wash on the sides of the breast. The rest of their underparts are white with a very pale yellow wash on the belly and undertail coverts. Both sexes have a chestnut iris, a black bill, and dark bluish gray legs and feet.

== Distribution and habitat ==
The Alagoas tyrannulet is found only in far northeastern Brazil, in eastern Pernambuco and northeastern Alagoas states. Its total range is estimated at 11,800 km^{2} (4,600 sq mi), within which it is known from about 20 locations. It is a bird of the Atlantic Forest, where it inhabits remnants of primary evergreen forest and mature secondary forest. One author states its elevational range as between 400 and 550 m (1,300 and 1,800 ft) but others have extended it to between 160 and 980 m (500 and 3,200 ft).

== Behavior ==
=== Movement ===
The Alagoas tyrannulet is a year-round resident.

=== Feeding ===
The Alagoas tyrannulet feeds primarily on insects. It forages actively, usually from the forest's mid-story to its canopy between about 6 and 15 m (20 and 50 ft) above the ground. It perches horizontally, sometimes with its tail cocked up, and makes short sallies to grab or hover-glean prey from leaves and twigs. It typically forages in pairs and sometimes joins mixed-species feeding flocks.

=== Breeding ===
The Alagoas tyrannulet's breeding season has not been detailed but appears to be between September and February. It makes a globular nest of plant fibers and dead leaves with a side entrance. The clutch size, incubation period, time to fledging, and details of parental care are not known.

=== Vocalization ===
The Alagoas tyrannulet's song is "1-3 snappy and squeaky rising notes followed by a slightly slower pitched, Furnariid-like chatter of sharp, overslurred notes" that lasts about 1.5 seconds. Its primary call is "a short, nasal, sharply rising chweep! note". Both the song and call are somewhat variable.

== Status ==
The IUCN originally in 1988 assessed the Alagoas tyrannulet as Threatened, then in 1994 as Endangered, in 2000 as Critically Endangered, in 2004 again as Endangered, and since 2017 again as Critically Endangered. It has a restricted range and its estimated population of 50 to 250 mature individuals is believed to be decreasing. A very large percentage of its Atlantic Forest habitat has been cleared for timber and conversion to sugar cane plantations. It does occur in a few well-protected areas. It is considered "locally fairly common" overall and "locally relatively common" in some private preserves.
