= Tody-flycatcher =

The tody-flycatchers are several species of birds in the family Tyrannidae:

- Genus Poecilotriccus
  - Rufous-crowned tody-flycatcher, Poecilotriccus ruficeps
  - Lulu's tody-flycatcher, Poecilotriccus luluae
  - White-cheeked tody-flycatcher, Poecilotriccus albifacies
  - Black-and-white tody-flycatcher, Poecilotriccus capitalis
  - Buff-cheeked tody-flycatcher, Poecilotriccus senex
  - Ruddy tody-flycatcher, Poecilotriccus russatus
  - Ochre-faced tody-flycatcher, Poecilotriccus plumbeiceps
  - Smoky-fronted tody-flycatcher, Poecilotriccus fumifrons
  - Rusty-fronted tody-flycatcher, Poecilotriccus latirostris
  - Slaty-headed tody-flycatcher, Poecilotriccus sylvia
  - Golden-winged tody-flycatcher, Poecilotriccus calopterus
  - Black-backed tody-flycatcher, Poecilotriccus pulchellus
- Genus Todirostrum:
  - Spotted tody-flycatcher, Todirostrum maculatum
  - Yellow-lored tody-flycatcher, Todirostrum poliocephalum
  - Short-tailed tody-flycatcher, Todirostrum viridanum
  - Black-headed tody-flycatcher, Todirostrum nigriceps
  - Painted tody-flycatcher, Todirostrum pictum
  - Common tody-flycatcher, Todirostrum cinereum
  - Yellow-browed tody-flycatcher, Todirostrum chrysocrotaphum
