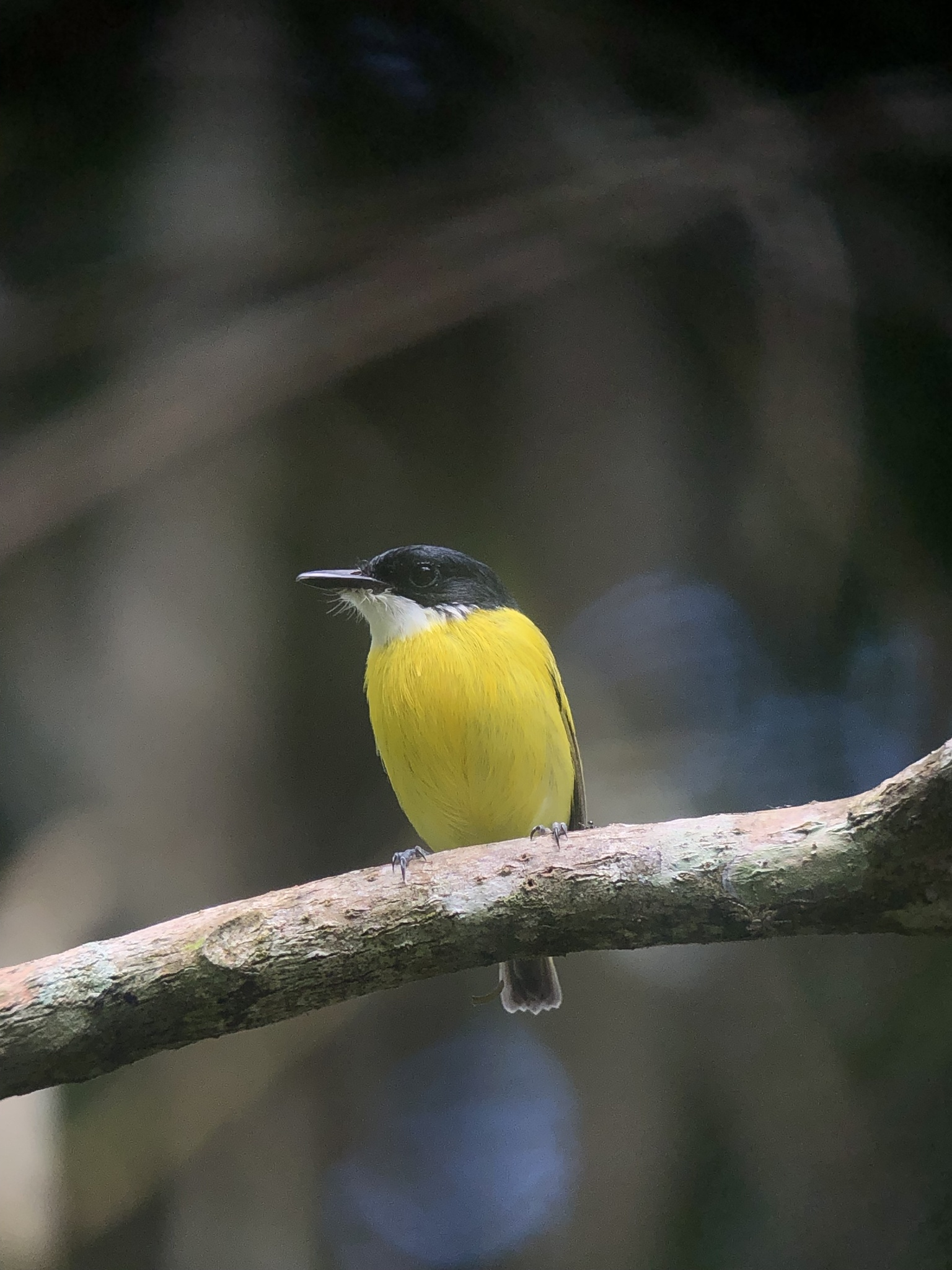

Conservation status
- Least Concern (IUCN 3.1)

Scientific classification
- Kingdom: Animalia
- Phylum: Chordata
- Class: Aves
- Order: Passeriformes
- Family: Tyrannidae
- Genus: Todirostrum
- Species: T. nigriceps

Binomial name
- Todirostrum nigriceps Sclater, PL, 1855

= Black-headed tody-flycatcher =

Species of bird

The black-headed tody-flycatcher (Todirostrum nigriceps) is a species of bird in the family Tyrannidae. It is found in Colombia, Costa Rica, Ecuador, Panama, and Venezuela. Its natural habitat is subtropical or tropical moist lowland forests. It is a small, black and yellow, insectivorous bird.

Its call and song are composed of high pitched one-note chirps. Each vocalization is often confounded for the other. Its reproductive traits are not well documented but both parents contribute to building the nest and clutches only have one egg at a time. In 2021, the IUCN assessed its conservation status and deemed it of least concern.

== Description ==
The black-headed tody flycatcher is a small bird with a glossy black head and a white throat. The black coloring continues down the sides of the neck. It has bright yellow underparts and olive-yellow upperparts. The wings are black with two yellow wingbars and yellow streaking and the tail is short and black. Its head is relatively large, as is its straight black bill. It has dark irises and no eye-rings. Its legs are blueish-gray.

The females and males have the same coloring. Adults are between 8–10.2 cm long and weigh 6–6.5 g. Juveniles have slightly duller plumage, pale yellow underparts and a vaguely yellow throat. Their heads are also duller black, and their wingbars are more olive-tinged.

The black-headed tody flycatcher is often confused with the common flycatcher (Todirostrum cinereum), which has a yellow throat and white eye-ring. Other similar species include the painted tody-flycatcher (Todirostrum pictum) which has black-streaked underparts and a yellow throat, and the yellow-browed tody-flycatcher (Todirostrum chrysocrotaphum) which has a yellow and black throat and yellow supercilium.

== Taxonomy ==
The black-headed tody-flycatcher is a member of the tyrant flycatcher family Tyrannidae. The genus Todirostrum was first described by French naturalist René Lesson in 1831. The name combines the genus Todus and the Latin "rostrum" which means bill. Within the Todirostrum genus, there are seven species. The species name "nigriceps" is Latin for "black-headed," hence its common name. The species was first described by Philip Sclater in 1855. Its holotype is in the British Museum of Natural History, in London.

Currently, no subspecies is recognized for the black-headed tody-flycatcher. The genus Poecilotriccus makes a monophyletic clade with Todirostrum that is considered basal to the other genera in the Tyrannidae family.

== Habitat and distribution ==
The black-headed tody-flycatcher is a non-migratory neotropical species found mainly in southern Central America and north-western South America. It is present in eastern Costa Rica, Panama, and north and western Colombia. It has also been recorded in far west Venezuela and western Ecuador. Although it has been found at altitudes of 1500 m, this species does not extend its range into the Andes. Rather, it borders the mountains and is occasionally found in the valleys between the Colombian cordilleras.

This flycatcher is a tree-dwelling species, that sticks to the canopy and edges of humid forests. It is highly selective in its habitat, choosing mostly the tallest trees. It has also been found in second-growth forests, where human disturbance has impacted the growth and species present.

== Behavior ==
=== Vocalizations ===
This species' call is a single high-pitched "peep". Its song is a series of 5 to 8 high-pitched "jyip" notes that are quickly repeated. They start evenly spaced and accelerate slightly at the end, increasing in pitch slightly. It often calls repeatedly, which can be easily confused with their song. The chirps also sound insect-like.

=== Diet ===
The black-headed tody-flycatcher is insectivorous. It targets flowering trees to find its meals, looking for insects that flowers attract. Its main diet includes various arthropods: such as beetles, flies, spiders, damselflies, ants, and parasitoid wasps. It forages alone, or sometimes in pairs, inside dense foliage and along canopy edges.

To ensure access to food, tody-flycatchers have evolved diets consisting of mostly non-overlapping arthropod species. Each species focuses on a select group of insects to feed on and avoids insect species eaten by other tody-flycatchers.

=== Reproduction ===
Black-headed tody flycatchers build nests using plant fibers and line them with down feathers. They often build their nests near wasp nests, assuring a nearby food source. Both adults in the parental unit contribute to building the nest. They thread plant material together into nests that hang from tree branches. Nesting times vary by location, but nesting tends to occur between June and August and adults have been found in breeding conditions in February. Clutches tend to be of a singular egg. The egg is white with sparse yellow-brown spotting and rust ends.

Occasionally, Piratic flycatchers (Legatus leucophaius) have usurped the black-headed tody-flycatchers' nests to use as their own.

== Conservation ==
The IUCN most recently assessed it in 2021 and classified it as "least concern". Though its population is declining, its wide distribution and high estimated population numbers do not qualify it for the "near-threatened" status.
