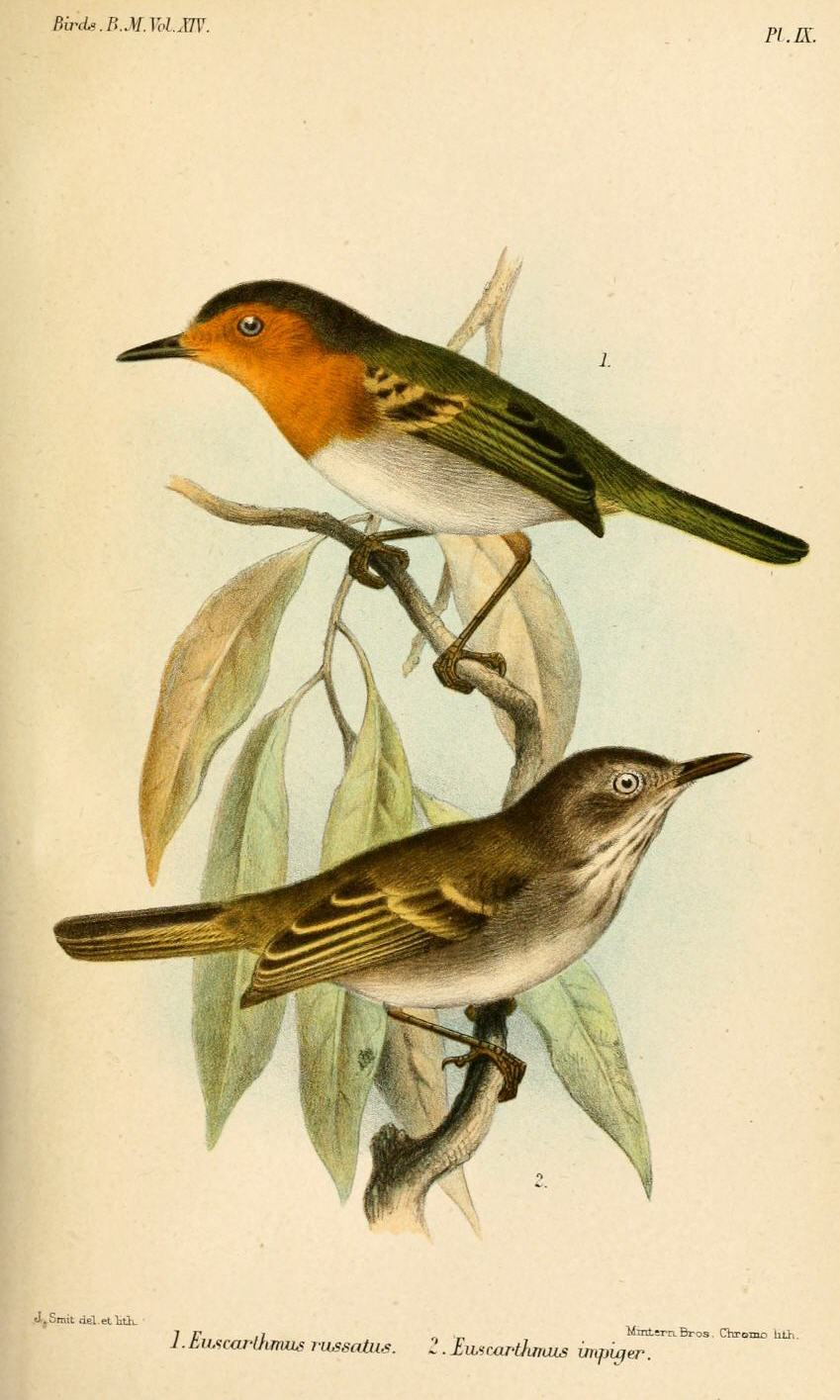
- Ruddy tody-flycatcher (above), illustration by Joseph Smit, 1888
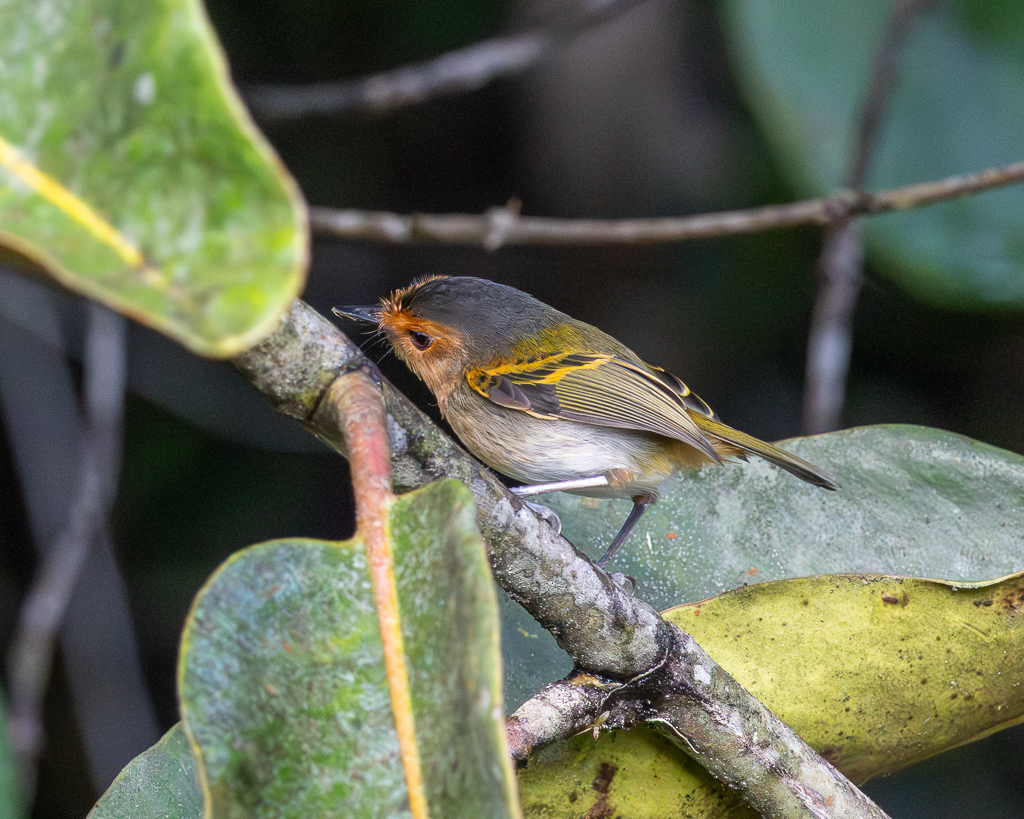

Conservation status
- Least Concern (IUCN 3.1)

Scientific classification
- Kingdom: Animalia
- Phylum: Chordata
- Class: Aves
- Order: Passeriformes
- Family: Tyrannidae
- Genus: Poecilotriccus
- Species: P. russatus

Binomial name
- Poecilotriccus russatus (Salvin & Godman, 1884)

Synonyms
- Euscarthmus russatus; Euscarthmornis russatus; Todirostrum russatum; Poecilotriccus russatus

= Ruddy tody-flycatcher =

Species of bird

The ruddy tody-flycatcher (Poecilotriccus russatus) is a species of bird in the family Tyrannidae, the tyrant flycatchers. It is native to the oriental tepuis of Venezuela.

== Taxonomy and systematics ==
The buff-cheeked tody-flycatcher was originally described in 1884 as Euscarthmus russatus. Since its description it was variously assigned to genera Euscarthmornis and Todirostrum. Following a 1988 publication, taxonomic systems moved russatus and several other species from Todirostrum to genus Poecilotriccus. By the early twenty-first century genus Poecilotriccus had species called both "tody-tyrant" and "tody-flycatcher" so taxonomic systems began renaming the "tyrants" to "flycatcher".

The ruddy tody-flycatcher is monotypic. It and the ochre-faced tody-flycatcher (P. plumbeiceps) form a superspecies.

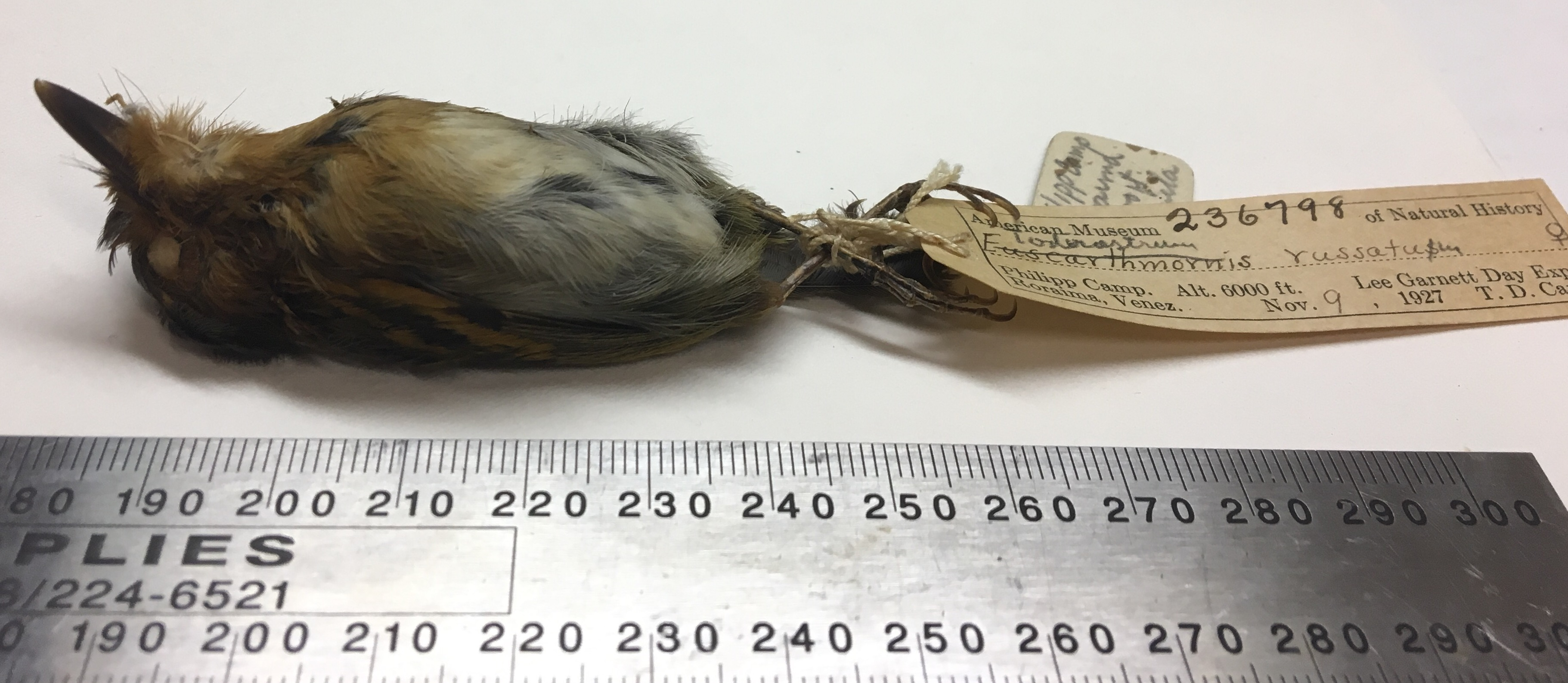
Museum specimen of ruddy tody-flycatcher in collection of the AMNH

== Description ==
The ruddy tody-flycatcher is 9.5 to 10.2 cm (3.7 to 4.0 in) long and weighs 6.5 to 8.3 g (0.23 to 0.29 oz). Adult males have a cinnamon-rufous forehead and a sooty-black crown. Their face is mostly cinnamon-rufous. Their back, rump, and uppertail coverts are dark olive. Their wings are dark olive with greenish yellow edges on the inner flight feathers and cinnamon-rufous tips on the coverts; the latter show as two wing bars. Their tail is dark olive. Their throat and breast are a slightly paler cinnamon-rufous than the face. Their belly is grayish with a brownish tinge on the flanks. Their iris is dark and their bill, legs, and feet are gray to blackish. Females have a grayer crown than males but are otherwise the same.

== Distribution and habitat ==
The ruddy tody-flycatcher is found on tepuis, primarily in southeastern Bolívar state in southeastern Venezuela and also slightly into adjoining western Guyana and northern Brazil. It primarily inhabits the edges of humid to wet forest heavy with mosses and the undergrowth in mature secondary forest. It also occurs at the edges of stunted woodlands dominated by Melastomataceae. In elevation it ranges between 1,200 and 2,500 m (3,900 and 8,200 ft).

== Behavior ==
=== Movement ===
The ruddy tody-flycatcher is a year-round resident.

=== Feeding ===
The ruddy tody-flycatcher feeds on insects. It typically forages in pairs and very seldom joins mixed-species feeding flocks. It mostly forages in dense vegetation up to about 2 m (7 ft) above the ground. It takes prey from foliage with short upward or forward sallies from a perch.

=== Breeding ===
Nothing is known about the ruddy tody-flycatcher's breeding biology.

=== Vocalization ===
The ruddy tody-flycatcher's call is "a weak dull tsuk, sick, tr'r'r'r'r'r'r'r'r" that is sometimes followed by two or three "short bursts of trills". Its elements are sometimes given separately, When it is agitated it gives variations like "chip-t'b'r'r'r'r, squeeeeo, [or] t'b'r'r'r with a squeak in the middle".

== Status ==
The IUCN has assessed the ruddy tody-flycatcher as being of Least Concern. It has a limited range; its population size is not known and is believed to be decreasing. No immediate threats have been identified. It is considered uncommon to common on various tepuis. "Tepuis within this species' range are rather unaffected by human disturbance owing to their inaccessibility, but vegetation on the tepuis is especially sensitive to fire and other disturbances; gold-prospectors and uncontrolled tourism have recently had severe adverse impacts locally."
