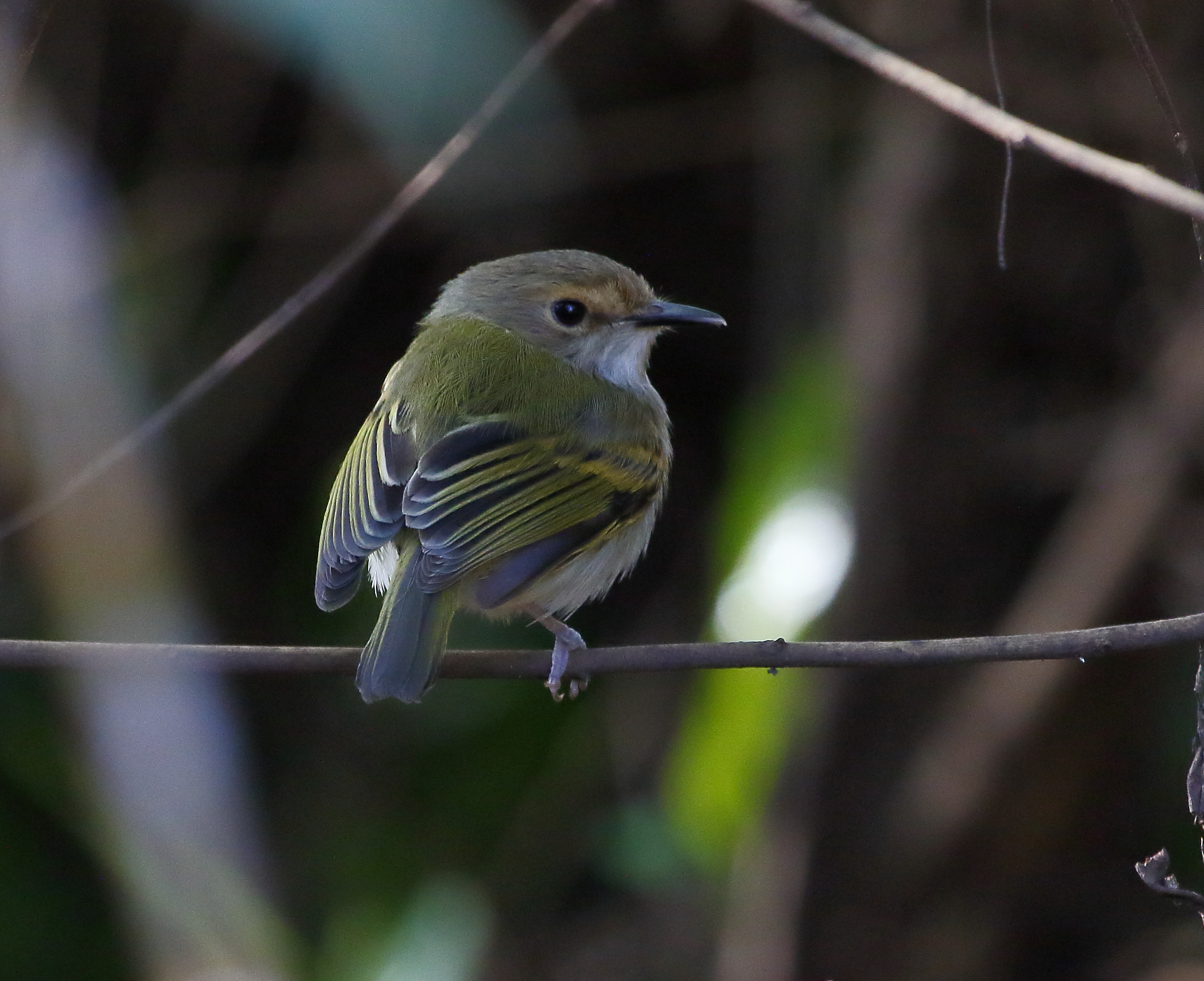
- at Aquidauana River, Aquidauana, Mato Grosso do Sul, Brazil.

Conservation status
- Least Concern (IUCN 3.1)

Scientific classification
- Kingdom: Animalia
- Phylum: Chordata
- Class: Aves
- Order: Passeriformes
- Family: Tyrannidae
- Genus: Poecilotriccus
- Species: P. latirostris

Binomial name
- Poecilotriccus latirostris (Pelzeln, 1868)

= Rusty-fronted tody-flycatcher =

Species of bird

The rusty-fronted tody-flycatcher (Poecilotriccus latirostris) is a species of bird in the family Tyrannidae, the tyrant flycatchers. It is found in Bolivia, Brazil, Colombia, Ecuador, Paraguay, and Peru.

== Taxonomy and systematics ==
The rusty-fronted tody-flycatcher was originally described in 1868 as Euscarthmus latirostris. It was later moved to genus Todirostrum. Following a 1988 publication, taxonomic systems moved latirostris and several other species from Todirostrum to genus Poecilotriccus. By the early twenty-first century genus Poecilotriccus had species called both "tody-tyrant" and "tody-flycatcher" so taxonomic systems began renaming the "tyrants" to "flycatcher". The rusty-fronted tody-flycatcher shares genus Poecilotriccus with 11 other species. It and the smoky-fronted tody-flycatcher (P. fumifrons) form a superspecies.

The rusty-fronted tody-flycatcher has these seven subspecies:

- P. l. mituensis (Olivares, 1965)
- P. l. caniceps (Chapman, 1924)
- P. l. latirostris (Pelzeln, 1868)
- P. l. mixtus (Zimmer, JT, 1940)
- P. l. ochropterus (Allen, JA, 1889)
- P. l. austroriparius (Todd, 1952)
- P. l. senectus (Griscom & Greenway, 1937)

== Description ==
The rusty-fronted tody-flycatcher is 9 to 9.5 cm (3.5 to 3.7 in) long and weighs about 7 to 9 g (0.25 to 0.32 oz). The sexes have the same plumage. Adults of the nominate subspecies P. l. latirostris have a brownish gray crown. Their forecrown ("front") and face are rusty-buff that is brightest on the lores and around the eyes. Their back, rump, and uppertail coverts are olive. Their wings are dusky with narrow yellowish edges on the flight feathers and ochraceous tips on the coverts; the latter show as two wing bars. Their tail is dusky. Their throat and underparts are grayish white with a faint olive tinge on the breast and flanks.

The other subspecies of the rusty-fronted tody-flycatcher differ from the nominate and each other thus:

- P. l. caniceps: darker and browner forehead and loral and eye areas than nominate, with dark grayish olive crown, a darker green back, a darker olive wash on the breast and sides, and a yellow wash on the belly
- P. l. mituensis: similar to caniceps but smaller with a darker grayer crown and darker face and back
- P. l. ochropterus: brownish (without gray) crown, paler and buffier face and paler underparts with minimum olive than nominate, golden tinge on back
- P. l. mixtus: intermediate between caniceps and ochropterus
- P. l. senectus: brownish crown; duller upperparts than most and darkest, grayest breast, and whitest throat and belly of all subspecies
- P. l. austroriparius: similar to senectus with darker upperparts and buffy rather than yellowish edges on some flight feathers.

All subspecies have a light reddish brown, pale pink-tan, or dark brown iris, a black bill, and gray legs and feet.

== Distribution and habitat ==
The subspecies of the rusty-fronted tody-flycatcher are found thus:

- P. l. mituensis: vicinity of Mitú, Vaupés Department in southeastern Colombia
- P. l. caniceps: from southern Colombian departments of Putumayo, Caquetá, and Amazonas east to central Amazonas state in Brazil and south through eastern Ecuador and most of eastern Peru
- P. l. latirostris: western Amazonian Brazil from the upper Juruá and Purus rivers east to the area of Parintins in far eastern Amazonas
- P. l. mixtus: from northern Puno Department in southeastern Peru south and east into Bolivia's La Paz, Beni, and Cochabamba departments
- P. l. ochropterus: southern Brazil from Mato Grosso and Tocantins south to Mato Grosso do Sul and northwestern São Paulo states
- P. l. austroriparius: Brazil, on the right bank of the lower Tapajos River in western Pará
- P. l. senectus: Brazil north of the Amazon from northeastern Amazonas east to northwestern Pará

Though the other sources do not include Paraguay in the species' range, the South American Classification Committee of the American Ornithological Society has documented records in that country.

The rusty-fronted tody-flycatcher inhabits low, dense, vegetation along river edges, in secondary forest, and in gallery forest. It also occurs in shrubby clearings within forest and on river islands. In elevation it reaches 1,100 m (3,600 ft) in Brazil, 1,200 m (3,900 ft) in Colombia, 700 m (2,300 ft) in Ecuador, and 1,000 m (3,300 ft) in Peru.

== Behavior ==
=== Movement ===
The rusty-fronted tody-flycatcher is believed to be a year-round resident.

=== Feeding ===
The rusty-fronted tody-flycatcher feeds on insects. It typically forages singly or in pairs and only rarely joins mixed-species feeding flocks. It mostly forages in dense vegetation within about 1 m (3 ft) above the ground but will ascend to about 3.5 m (11 ft) along vine-covered tree trunks. It primarily takes prey from foliage with short sallies from a perch.

=== Breeding ===
The rusty-fronted tody-flycatcher's breeding season in Colombia includes June, but nothing else is known about the species' breeding biology.

=== Vocalization ===
The rusty-fronted tody-flycatcher's song has been described as "an easily overlooked, insectlike descending trill, low-pitched and rich in quality: tchur'r'r'r'r'r". Its calls are described as "a deep, rich tchup and a rising-falling musical rattled wrr'ee'e'r'r'r'r'r". Other authors describe the song as "a sharp, low-pitched, rattled 'tik, trrrr' or 'tik, trrrr, tgrrrr', [or] sometimes the 'tik' alone" and as a "short, descending 'tdrrrur' rattle, preceded by some 'tic' notes".

== Status ==
The IUCN has assessed the rusty-fronted tody-flycatcher as being of Least Concern. It has a very large range; its population size is not known and is believed to be stable. No immediate threats have been identified. It is considered uncommon in Colombia, "inconspicuous and hardly ever recorded" in Ecuador, and "fairly common but secretive" in Peru. "Human activity has little direct effect on the Rusty-fronted Tody-Flycatcher, other than the local effects of habitat destruction. In the short term, this species may even benefit from habitat disturbance, given that it occupies second growth and forest edge, rather than primary closed-canopy forest."
