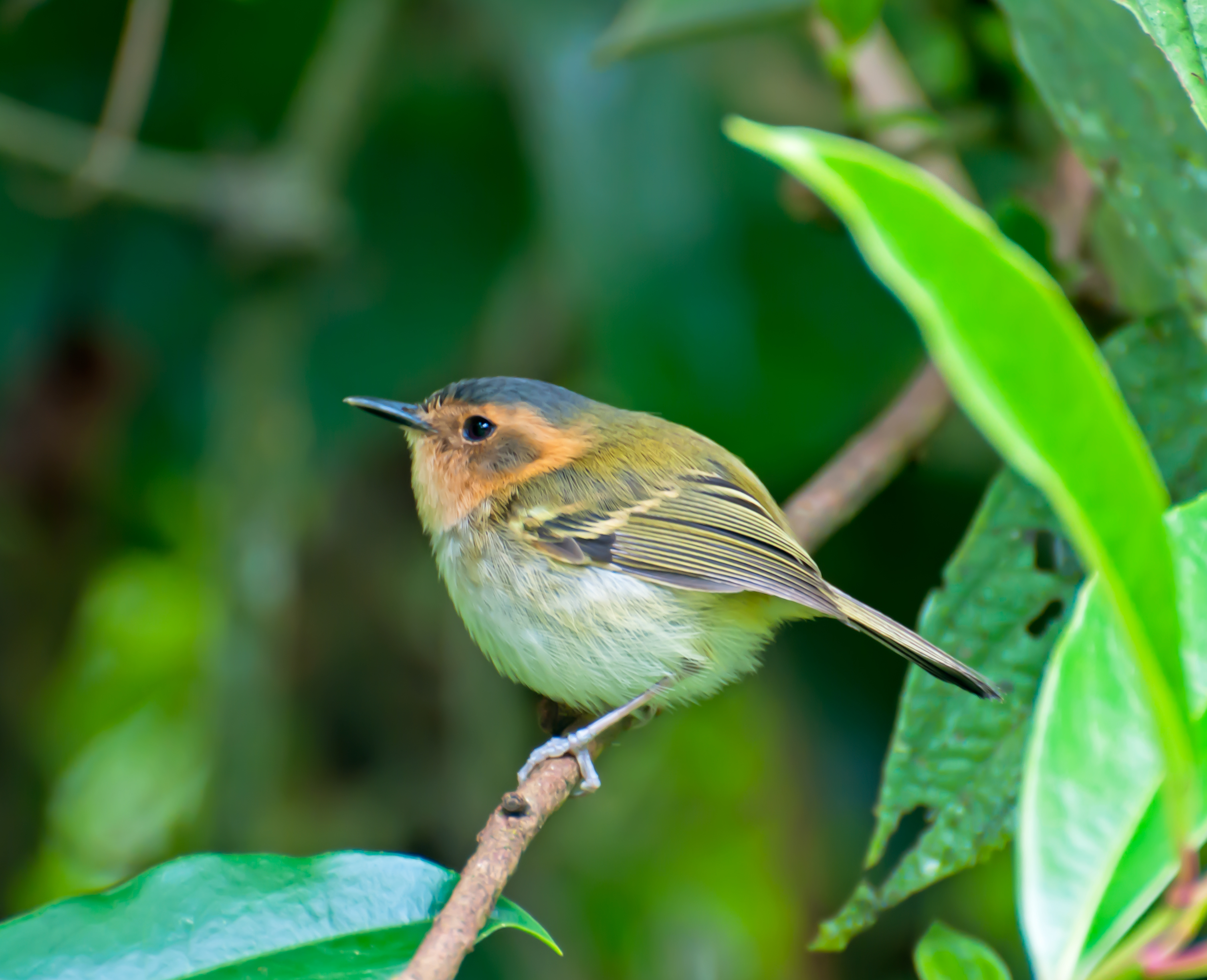
- At Nucleo Santa Virginia, São Luis do Paraitinga, São Paulo, Brazil

Conservation status
- Least Concern (IUCN 3.1)

Scientific classification
- Kingdom: Animalia
- Phylum: Chordata
- Class: Aves
- Order: Passeriformes
- Family: Tyrannidae
- Genus: Poecilotriccus
- Species: P. plumbeiceps

Binomial name
- Poecilotriccus plumbeiceps (Lafresnaye, 1846)

Synonyms
- Todirostrum plumbeiceps

= Ochre-faced tody-flycatcher =

Species of bird

The ochre-faced tody-flycatcher (Poecilotriccus plumbeiceps) is a species of bird in the family Tyrannidae, the tyrant flycatchers. It is found in Argentina, Bolivia, Brazil, Paraguay, Peru, and Uruguay.

== Taxonomy and systematics ==
The ochre-faced tody-flycatcher was originally described in 1846 as Todirostrum plumbeiceps. For a time in the early twentieth century it was assigned to genus Euscarthmornis and then returned to Todirostrum. Following a 1988 publication, taxonomic systems moved plumbeiceps and several other species from Todirostrum to genus Poecilotriccus. By the early twenty-first century genus Poecilotriccus had species called both "tody-tyrant" and "tody-flycatcher" so taxonomic systems began renaming the "tyrants" to "flycatcher". The ochre-faced and the ruddy tody-flycatcher (P. russatus) form a superspecies.

The ochre-faced tody-flycatcher has these four subspecies:

- P. p. obscurus (Zimmer, JT, 1940)
- P. p. viridiceps (Salvadori, 1897)
- P. p. plumbeiceps (Lafresnaye, 1846)
- P. p. cinereipectus (Novaes, 1953)

== Description ==
The ochre-faced tody-flycatcher is 9 to 10 cm (3.5 to 3.9 in) long and weighs 5.3 to 6 g (0.19 to 0.21 oz). The sexes have the same plumage. Adults of the nominate subspecies P. p. plumbeiceps have a buffish cinnamon forehead and a gray crown. Their face is mostly buffish cinnamon with dusky ear coverts. Their back, rump, and uppertail coverts are dark olive. Their wings are dusky with ochraceous edges on the flight feathers and tips on the coverts; the latter show as two wing bars. Their tail is dark olive. Their throat is a slightly paler buffish cinnamon than the face. Their breast and belly are grayish white. Subspecies P. p. viridiceps has an olive tinge on the crown and a grayer breast than the nominate. P. p. obscurus resembles viridiceps but is darker overall. P. p. cinereipectus has a grayer breast than the nominate. All subspecies have a brown iris, a dark grayish bill, and dark grayish legs and feet.

== Distribution and habitat ==
The ochre-faced tody-flycatcher has a disjunct distribution. The subspecies are found thus:

- P. p. obscurus: eastern slope of the Andes from Cuzco Department in southeastern Peru south into Bolivia as far as Santa Cruz Department
- P. p. viridiceps: eastern slope of the Andes from Chuquisaca Department in southern Bolivia south into northwestern Argentina as far as Salta Province
- P. p. plumbeiceps: eastern Paraguay, Misiones and Corrientes provinces in northeastern Argentina, southeastern Brazil from (Rio de Janeiro and São Paulo states south through Rio Grande do Sul, and extreme northeastern Uruguay
- P. p. cinereipectus: northeastern and east-central Brazil from Pernambuco south to southeastern Minas Gerais and Espírito Santo

The species was first documented in Uruguay in 1997. It was again documented in 1999 and then in 2006.

The ochre-faced tody-flycatcher inhabits the edges of humid forest and also dense undergrowth in secondary forest. It favors areas with dense vine tangles, Chusquea bamboo, Pteridium bracken, and shrubs.

== Behavior ==
=== Movement ===
The ochre-faced tody-flycatcher is believed to be a year-round resident.

=== Feeding ===
The ochre-faced tody-flycatcher feeds on insects. It typically forages in pairs and very seldom joins mixed-species feeding flocks. It mostly forages in dense vegetation and takes prey from foliage close to the ground with short sallies from a perch.

=== Breeding ===
The ochre-faced tody-flycatcher's breeding season has not been defined but includes November in Argentina and January in Paraguay. Its nest is a messy pear-shaped ball with a side entrance under a "visor". It is constructed from dry plant fibers, some of which often dangle below the nest. It is typically suspended from the tip of a branch about 1.4 to 2 m (5 to 7 ft) above the ground. The clutch is two to three eggs. The incubation period, time to fledging, and details of parental care are not known. Brood parasitism by the pavonine cuckoo (Dromococcyx pavoninus) has been documented.

=== Vocalization ===
What could be either the call or song of the ochre-faced tody-flycatcher in Brazil is a "very fast 'prrrrrur' rattle (1 or 2 x, 2nd time slightly lower)". In Peru its song is described as "a deep, rich sputtering trill: tjrrp-tjrrrrrrr'rrr'rrp or simply tjrrrrp" and its call "a quiet rich tchup".

== Status ==
The IUCN has assessed the ochre-faced tody-flycatcher as being of Least Concern. It has a very large range; its population size is not known and is believed to be decreasing. No immediate threats have been identified. It is considered overall fairly common and occurs in many protected areas.
