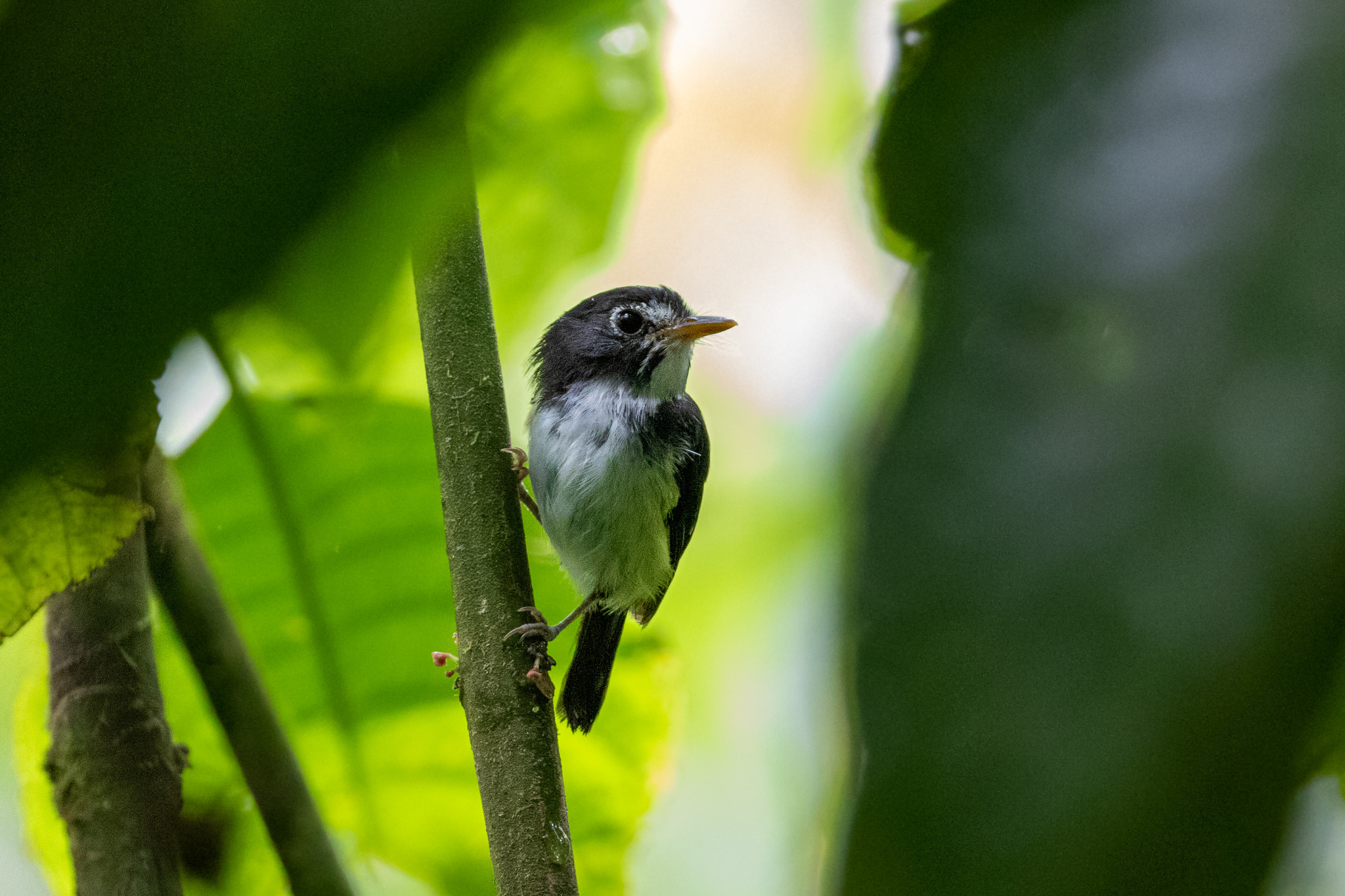

Conservation status
- Least Concern (IUCN 3.1)

Scientific classification
- Kingdom: Animalia
- Phylum: Chordata
- Class: Aves
- Order: Passeriformes
- Family: Tyrannidae
- Genus: Poecilotriccus
- Species: P. capitalis

Binomial name
- Poecilotriccus capitalis (Sclater, PL, 1857)

= Black-and-white tody-flycatcher =

Species of bird

The black-and-white tody-flycatcher (Poecilotriccus capitalis) is a species of bird in the family Tyrannidae, the tyrant flycatchers. It is found in Brazil, Colombia, Ecuador, and Peru.

== Taxonomy and systematics ==
The black-and-white tody-flycatcher was originally described in 1857 as Todirostrum capitale. The species eventually received the English name "black-and-white tody-tyrant" and the specific epithet capitalis. Following a 1988 publication, taxonomic systems moved capitalis and several other species from Todirostrum to genus Poecilotriccus. By the early twenty-first century genus Poecilotriccus had species called both "tody-tyrant" and "tody-flycatcher" so taxonomic systems began renaming the "tyrants" to "flycatcher".

The black-and-white tody-flycatcher is monotypic. However, for a time in the twentieth century it and what is now the white-cheeked tody-flycatcher (P. albifascies) were considered conspecific. In addition, a form named P. tricolor was at times considered a subspecies but it is now not considered to be a valid taxon.

== Description ==
The black-and-white tody-flycatcher is about 9 to 9.5 cm (3.5 to 3.7 in) long and weighs 5.6 to 8 g (0.20 to 0.28 oz). Adult males have an almost entirely glossy black head and upperparts. They have a small white spot above their lores, a white eye-ring, and wide pale yellow edges on their tertials. Their throat and underparts are mostly white, with streaky black on the sides of the breast that sometimes extends in a thin band across the breast, and a pale yellow tinge on the flanks and crissum. Females have a chestnut crown and buffy lores and eye-ring on an otherwise mostly gray face. Their nape, back, and uppertail coverts are olive. Their tail and wings are blackish with wide pale yellow edges on the tertials and olive edges on the other flight feathers. Both sexes have a reddish brown iris, a black maxilla, a pale orange-yellow mandible, and gray legs and feet.

== Distribution and habitat ==
The black-and-white tody-flycatcher has a highly disjunct distribution. Its largest range extends from eastern Nariño, Putumayo and Amazonas departments in southern Colombia south on the eastern Andean slope through Ecuador and into Peru as far south as San Martín Department and east into northern Loreto Department. There is also an isolated population further south in Peru's Cuzco Department and other small populations in the Brazilian states of Amazonas, Rondônia, and Mato Grosso. The species primarily inhabits the edges of lowland and foothill terra firme forest and along roads and small watercourses. It greatly favors viny tangles and stands of bamboo. It also occurs in secondary forest without bamboo. In Colombia it ranges between 250 and 1,300 m (800 and 4,300 ft), in Ecuador up to 1,350 m (4,400 ft), and in Peru between 600 and 1,300 m (2,000 and 4,300 ft).

== Behavior ==
=== Movement ===
The black-and-white tody-flycatcher is a year-round resident.

=== Feeding ===
The black-and-white tody-flycatcher feeds on insects. It typically forages singly or in pairs, and in Colombia and Peru at least is known to join mixed-species feeding flocks. It forages mostly in dense vegetation near the ground. It takes prey from foliage with short upward or forward sallies from a perch.

=== Breeding ===
One black-and-white tody-flycatcher nest is known; it was observed being constructed in Ecuador in October. Both sexes contributed to the construction. It was an ovoid bag dangling from a thin branch about 1.3 m (4 ft) above the ground in an understory tree. It was made from thin bark strips, rootlets, pieces of leaves, and fungal rhizomorphs; some of the material dangled below the nest. The species' clutch size, incubation period, time to fledging, and details of parental care are not known.

=== Vocalization ===
The black-and-white tody-flycatcher's call is a "fast sharp 'tik, t-r-r-r-r-r-r-ew' ", and when agitated it give a "more explosive 'tk, tk, tk, whey-whey-whey-whuh' ".

== Status ==
The IUCN has assessed the black-and-white tody-flycatcher as being of Least Concern. It has a large range; its population size is not known and is believed to be decreasing. No immediate threats have been identified. It is considered uncommon in Colombia and Peru and "scarce and local" in Ecuador. It occurs in a few protected areas in Ecuador.
