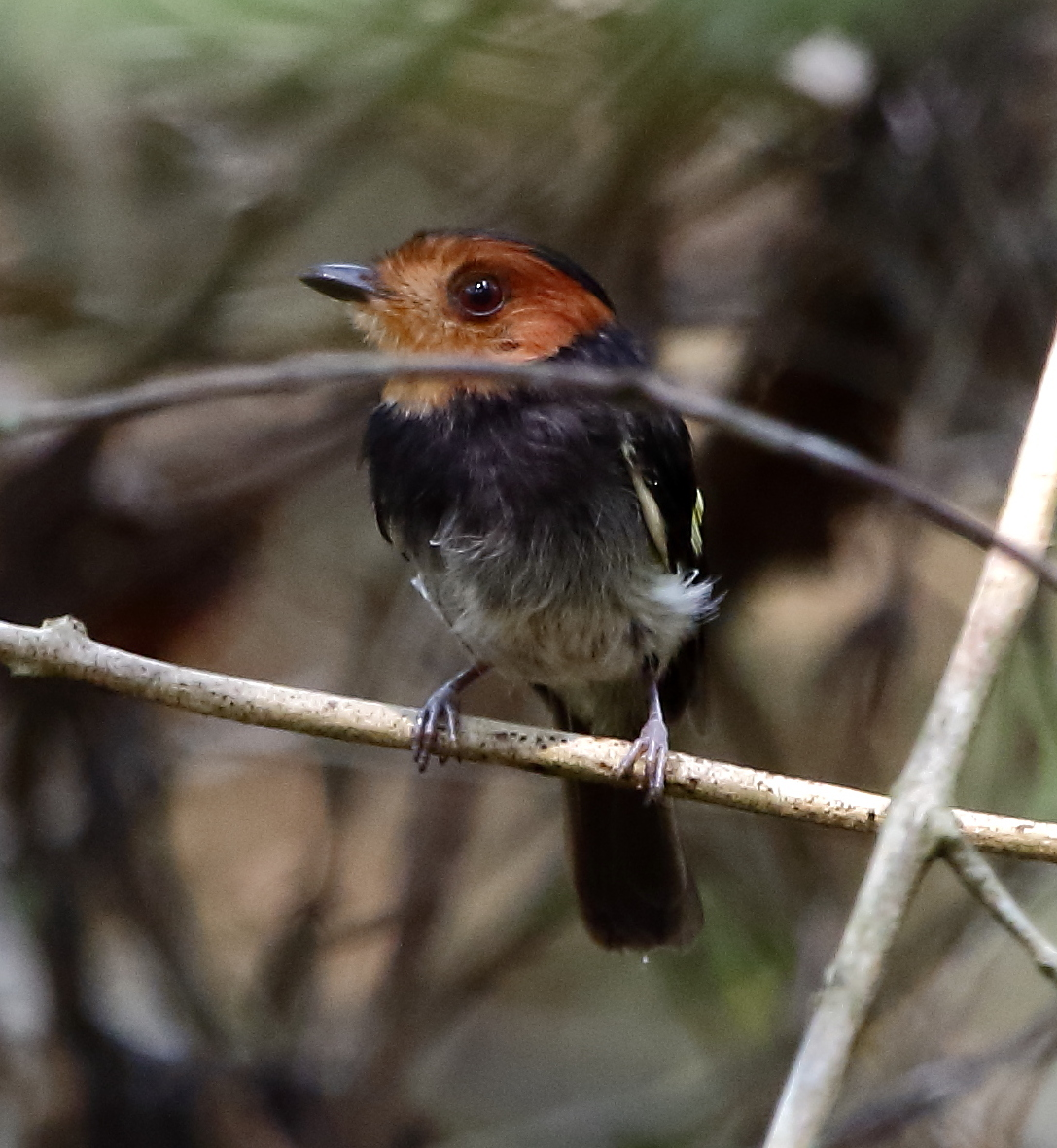
- Male at Carajás National Forest, Pará state, Brazil

Conservation status
- Least Concern (IUCN 3.1)

Scientific classification
- Kingdom: Animalia
- Phylum: Chordata
- Class: Aves
- Order: Passeriformes
- Family: Tyrannidae
- Genus: Taeniotriccus; Berlepsch & Hartert, 1902
- Species: T. andrei

Binomial name
- Taeniotriccus andrei Berlepsch & Hartert, 1902

Synonyms
- Poecilotriccus andrei

= Black-chested tyrant =

Species of bird

The black-chested tyrant (Taeniotriccus andrei) is a species of bird in the family Tyrannidae, the tyrant flycatchers. It is found in Brazil, Suriname, and Venezuela.

== Taxonomy and systematics ==
The black-chested tyrant was originally described in 1902 as Taeniotriccus andrei. The authors gave it the specific epithet andrei "after Mr. E. André, of Trinidad, its discoverer". Some late twentieth century authors merged Taeniotriccus into genus Poecilotriccus. Later research found that those two genera are not closely related and found instead that Taeniotriccus and Cnipodectes are sister genera.

The black-chested tyrant is the only member of its genus. It has two subspecies, the nominate T. a. andrei (Berlepsch & Hartert) and T. a. klagesi (Todd, 1925).

== Description ==
The black-chested tyrant is about 12 cm (4.7 in) long and weighs about 8 to 10.5 g (0.28 to 0.37 oz). Adult males have a mostly rufous-chestnut head with a long black crest. Their back, rump, uppertail coverts, and tail are black. Their wings are black with yellow bases on most of the flight feathers. Their breast has a wide dark gray to black band that meets the black of the back. Their belly is pale gray that becomes lighter by the vent area and has a greenish yellow tinge on the flanks and undertail coverts. Adult females have a duller rufous head and shorter black crest than males. Their back is brownish olive, their breast bronze-olive gray, and their belly white with a stronger olive orange tinge on the flanks and undertail coverts. Males of subspecies T. a. klagesi do not differ from those of andrei. Females have an olive gray breast and whitish undertail coverts with no yellow or olive there or on the flanks. Both sexes of both subspecies have a dark brown iris, a black bill with sometimes a pinkish base to the mandible, and pale gray legs and feet.

== Distribution and habitat ==
The black-chested tyrant has a disjunct distribution. Most sources place the nominate subspecies in Venezuela primarily from central Bolívar north to Delta Amacuro and eastern Monagas. Their descriptions extend its range south through Bolívar into northeastern Amazonas and northern Roraima states in extreme northern Brazil. They place subspecies T. a. klagesi only at scattered locations in Brazil south of the Amazon River in Pará, northern Maranhão, and Mato Grosso. However, the South American Classification Committee of the American Ornithological Society has documented records of the species in Suriname as well, but without attributing it to a subspecies.

The black-chested tyrant inhabits dense understory vegetation with viny tangles, primarily in humid tropical forest, the edges of seasonally flooded várzea forest, and terra firme forest with much Cecropia and bamboo. In coastal Venezuela it also occurs in mangrove forest. In elevation it ranges from sea level to about 350 m (1,100 ft).

== Behavior ==
=== Movement ===
The black-chested tyrant is a year-round resident.

=== Feeding ===
The black-chested tyrant feeds on insects, though details are lacking. It typically forages singly or in pairs and has not been observed to join mixed-species feeding flocks. It mostly forages in dense vegetation within about 3 m (10 ft) of the ground. It primarily takes prey from foliage, vines, and branches with short sallies from a perch.

=== Breeding ===
A female black-chested tyrant was observed carrying nesting material January. Nothing else is known about the species breeding biology.

=== Vocal and non-vocal sounds ===
The black-chested tyrant's song is a "series of widely spaced, alternating 'tjuw' and higher 'tuweet-tueet' notes". Its call is a "series of well-spaced, low, emphasized, nasal 'tjuw' notes". The vocalizations have also been written as CHEWP and CHEWP....K'DINK KDINK". Its wings "whirr" during short perch-to-perch flights and "prey-capture sallies are accompanied by an audible bill snap".

== Status ==
The IUCN has assessed the black-chested tyrant as being of Least Concern. It has a large range; its population size is not known and is believed to be decreasing. No immediate threats have been identified. In eastern Brazil the species "was found to exhibit a wide tolerance to different forest types, occupying both undisturbed and disturbed (burnt and logged) primary forest and even young secondary forests...indicating that this species is less threatened by land-use change than many Amazonian forest-dependent species".
