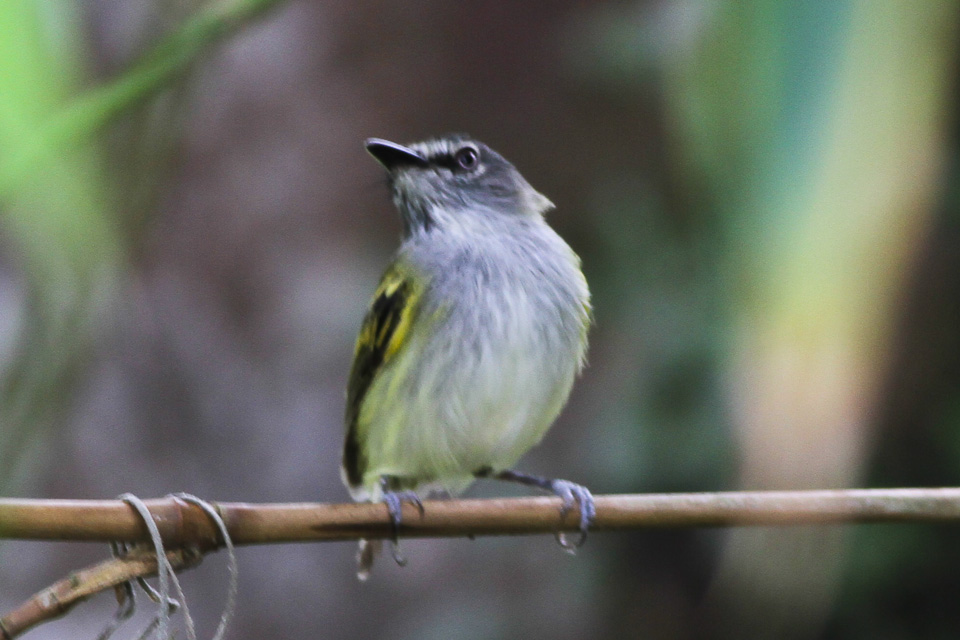

Conservation status
- Least Concern (IUCN 3.1)

Scientific classification
- Kingdom: Animalia
- Phylum: Chordata
- Class: Aves
- Order: Passeriformes
- Family: Tyrannidae
- Genus: Poecilotriccus
- Species: P. sylvia

Binomial name
- Poecilotriccus sylvia (Desmarest, 1806)

Synonyms
- Todus Sylvia (protonym)

= Slaty-headed tody-flycatcher =

Species of bird

The slaty-headed tody-flycatcher, or slate-headed tody-flycatcher, (Poecilotriccus sylvia) is a species of bird in the family Tyrannidae, the tyrant flycatchers. It is found in Belize, Brazil, Colombia, Costa Rica, Guatemala, Guyana, Honduras, Mexico, Nicaragua, Panama, Venezuela, and possibly French Guiana.

== Taxonomy and systematics ==
The slaty-headed tody-flycatcher was originally described in 1806 as Todus Sylvia. It was later moved to genus Todirostrum. Following a 1988 publication, taxonomic systems moved sylvia and several other species from Todirostrum to genus Poecilotriccus. By the early twenty-first century genus Poecilotriccus had species called both "tody-tyrant" and "tody-flycatcher" so taxonomic systems began renaming the "tyrants" to "flycatcher". The slaty-headed tody-flycatcher shares genus Poecilotriccus with 11 other species.

The slaty-headed tody-flycatcher has these five subspecies:

- P. s. schistaceiceps (Sclater, PL, 1859)
- P. s. superciliaris (Lawrence, 1871)
- P. s. griseolus (Todd, 1913)
- P. s. sylvia (Desmarest, 1806)
- P. s. schulzi (Berlepsch, 1907)

Subspecies P. s. schistaceiceps was originally described as a full species and at least one twentieth century author retained that treatment.

== Description ==
The slaty-headed tody-flycatcher is about 9 to 10 cm (3.5 to 3.9 in) long and weighs 6.7 to 8.5 g (0.24 to 0.30 oz). The sexes have the same plumage. Adults of the nominate subspecies P. s. sylvia have a gray crown and nape. Their lores are gray; they have a white line above the lores and a broken white eye-ring on an otherwise gray face. Their back, rump, and uppertail coverts are olive. Their wings are blackish with narrow yellowish edges on the inner flight feathers and large yellow tips on the coverts; the latter show as two wing bars. Their tail is olive. Their throat and underparts are grayish white with grayish streaks on the lower throat and breast and an olive tinge on the flanks. Juveniles have an olive crown and back, buffy wing bars, and paler, grayer, unstreaked underparts.

The other subspecies of the slaty-headed tody-flycatcher differ from the nominate and each other thus:

- P. s. schistaceiceps: pale yellow sides, flanks, and crissum, unstreaked underparts, and a highly variable iris color from pale yellow to reddish brown
- P. s. superciliaris: somewhat darker than nominate
- P. s. griseolus: somewhat darker than nominate with more gray on the lower throat and breast
- P. s. schulzi: darker than nominate with much grayer breast and deeper ochraceous wing bars.

All subspecies usually have a dark brown iris, though it is sometimes pale yellow, gray, or white. They have a black bill and light bluish gray legs and feet.

== Distribution and habitat ==
The slaty-headed tody-flycatcher has a highly disjunct distribution. The subspecies are found thus:

- P. s. schistaceiceps: from southern Veracruz and northern Oaxaca in southern Mexico south on the Gulf/Caribbean slope through Belize, Guatemala, and Honduras and on both the Caribbean and Pacific slopes through Nicaragua and Costa Rica into Panama to the Canal Zone
- P. s. superciliaris: Colombia on Caribbean coast, valleys of the Magdalena and Cauca rivers, the middle of the Dagua River valley, and on the eastern slope of the Eastern Andes south to Meta Department
- P. s. griseolus: extreme eastern Colombia and across most of northern Venezuela
- P. s. sylvia: from northeastern Roraima state in northern Brazil through southwestern Guyana; possibly in French Guiana (see below)
- P. s. schulzi: northeastern Brazil from eastern Pará east to Piauí

Most sources include French Guiana in the slaty-headed tody-flycatcher's range (Clements and Hilty say "the Guianas"). However, the South American Classification Committee of the American Ornithological Society has no records of the species in that country.

The slaty-headed tody-flycatcher inhabits dense scrubby vegetation in a variety of landscapes in the tropical and lower subtropical zones. These include the edges of primary forest both natural and along roads, secondary forest, overgrown clearings and pastures, gallery forest, and somewhat open woodlands. In elevation it mostly ranges from sea level to 1,100 m (3,600 ft) overall though only to about 1,000 m (3,300 ft) in Costa Rica and Venezuela. It reaches 1,350 m (4,400 ft) in Colombia.

== Behavior ==
=== Movement ===
The slaty-headed tody-flycatcher is believed to be a year-round resident.

=== Feeding ===
The slaty-headed tody-flycatcher feeds mostly on arthropods and also includes fruit in its diet. It typically forages in pairs and only rarely joins mixed-species feeding flocks. It mostly forages in dense vegetation near the ground but will occasionally hunt in the forest canopy. It primarily takes prey from foliage with short sallies from a perch.

=== Breeding ===
The slaty-headed tody-flycatcher's breeding season has not been fully defined. Overall it appears to span from January to August with much geographic variation. Its nest is pear-shaped with a side entrance made from moss, grass, and other plant fibers. It is usually suspended from the tip of a branch with some cover above it up to about 3 m (10 ft) above the ground. The typical clutch is two eggs that are creamy white with brown spots. Fledging occurs about 18 to 21 days after hatch. The incubation period and details of parental care are not known.

=== Vocalization ===
According to Hilty, the slaty-headed tody-flycatcher's vocalizations are "insect- or froglike". They include "a soft, gravelly trup or trup grrrr, varying to tik trrrrrrr; nasal froglike grrrrrrr also given singly. When excited tíc-a-turrr". Fagan similarly describes one call as "a 2-part tip!-purrrrrrrr".

== Status ==
The IUCN has assessed the slaty-headed tody-flycatcher as being of Least Concern. It has a very large range; its estimated population of at least 500,000 mature individuals is believed to be decreasing. No immediate threats have been identified. It is considered uncommon to fairly common in northern Central America, "relatively common only in wet southern Pacific" part of Costa Rica, common in Colombia, and locally common in Venezuela. It occurs in many protected areas both public and private. "Tolerant of converted habitat; probably benefits from deforestation if forest subsequently allowed to regenerate."
