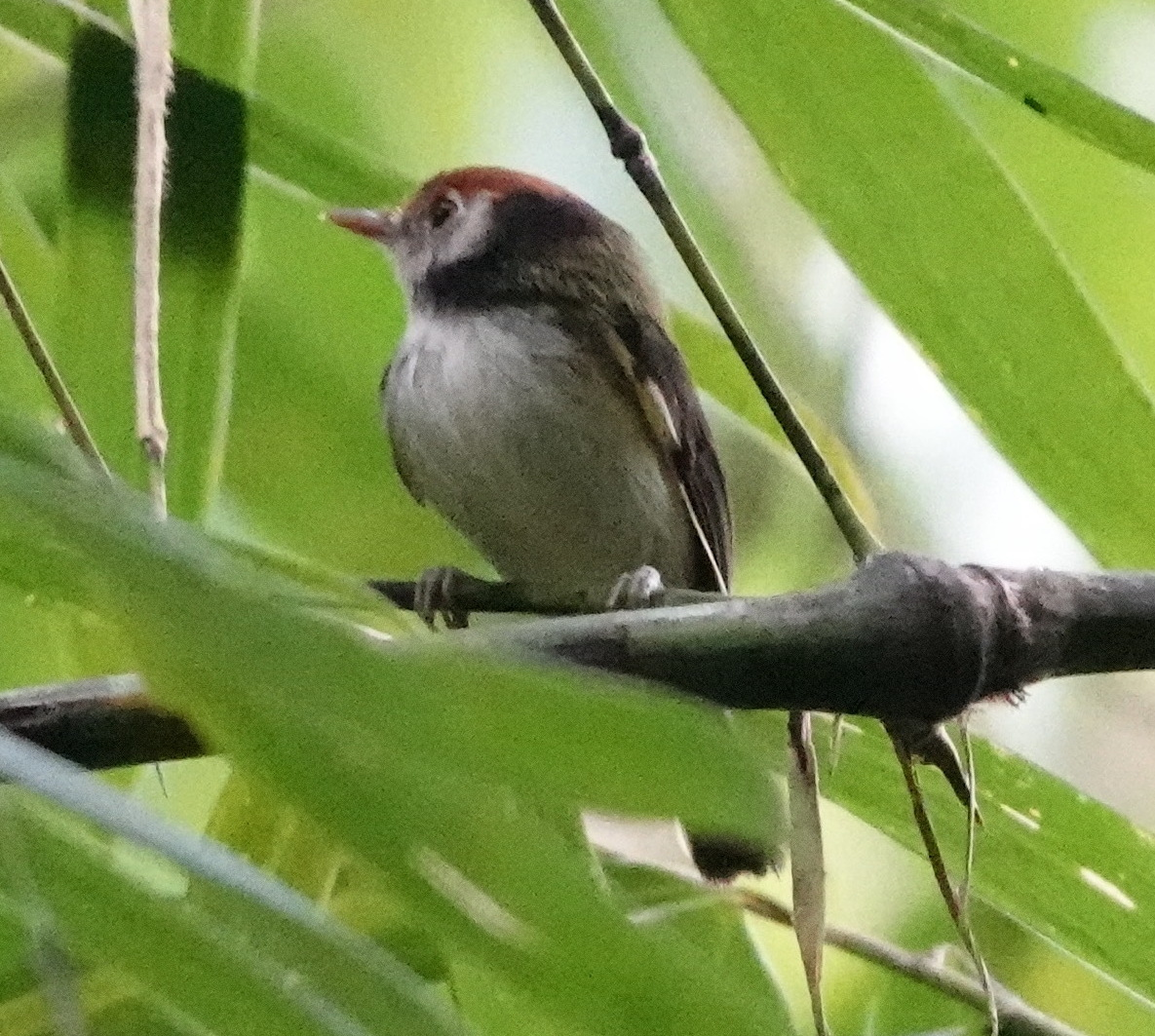

Conservation status
- Least Concern (IUCN 3.1)

Scientific classification
- Kingdom: Animalia
- Phylum: Chordata
- Class: Aves
- Order: Passeriformes
- Family: Tyrannidae
- Genus: Poecilotriccus
- Species: P. albifacies

Binomial name
- Poecilotriccus albifacies (Blake, 1959)

= White-cheeked tody-flycatcher =

Species of bird

The white-cheeked tody-flycatcher (Poecilotriccus albifacies) is a species of bird in the family Tyrannidae. It is found in Bolivia, Brazil, and Peru.

== Taxonomy and systematics ==
The white-cheeked tody-flycatcher was originally described in 1959 as Todirostrum albifacies. The author considered it closely related to what is now the black-and-white tody-flycatcher (Poecilotriccus capitalis). For a period in the twentieth century the two were treated as conspecific. The species eventually received the English name "white-cheeked tody-tyrant". Following a 1988 publication, taxonomic systems moved albifacies and several other species from Todirostrum to genus Poecilotriccus. By the early twenty-first century genus Poecilotriccus had species called both "tody-tyrant" and "tody-flycatcher" so taxonomic systems began renaming the "tyrants" to "flycatcher".

The white-cheeked tody-flycatcher is monotypic.

== Description ==
The white-cheeked tody-flycatcher is about 9.5 cm (3.7 in) long and weighs about 8 g (0.28 oz). Adult males have a rufous crown and black nape that thins as it extends under the cheeks. Their face is otherwise white. Their back, rump, and uppertail coverts are olive. Their wings are black with white edges on the tertials. Their tail is black. Their throat and underparts are mostly white with streaky black sides to the breast. Females are overall duller than males and have dark gray neck and cheeks and wide olive edges on the flight feathers. Both sexes have a brown iris, a black maxilla, an orange-yellow mandible, and gray legs and feet.

== Distribution and habitat ==
The white-cheeked tody-flycatcher is found locally in southern Madre de Dios and northeastern Cuzco departments of southeastern Peru, at a few locations in western Brazil's Acre state, and at one location in far northwestern Bolivia. It inhabits humid tropical transitional forest where it almost exclusively occurs in dense thickets of Guadua bamboo. In elevation it reaches 1,050 m (3,400 ft).

== Behavior ==
=== Movement ===
The white-cheeked tody-flycatcher is believed to be a year-round resident.

=== Feeding ===
The white-cheeked tody-flycatcher feeds on insects. It typically forages in pairs and is not known to join mixed-species feeding flocks. It forages mostly in bamboo thickets and occasionally in vine tangles in the nearby forest, typically between about 2 and 9 m (7 and 30 ft) above the ground. It takes prey from bamboo foliage and branches by gleaning while perched and with short upward or forward sallies from a perch.

=== Breeding ===
Nothing is known about the white-cheeked tody-flycatcher's breeding biology.

=== Vocalization ===
The white-cheeked tody-flycatcher's song is "a slightly rising series of rich, deep notes: turp-ip-ip-ip ip ip ip". Its calls are "grinding, rising-falling churrs and a rapid series of rich notes: turp-turp 'trreeeee".

== Status ==
The IUCN originally in 1988 assessed the white-cheeked tody-flycatcher as Near Threatened but since 2004 as being of Least Concern. It has a limited range; its population size is not known and is believed to be decreasing. No immediate threats have been identified. It is considered local and uncommon. It occurs in a few protected areas. "[Southeastern] Peruvian lowland forests remain relatively intact, but mining, oil/gas extraction and other development schemes, coupled with associated road-building, human intrusion and selective logging, pose serious future threats; the integrity even of large protected areas, as at Manu [National Park] and Tambopata-Candamo, is not assured."
