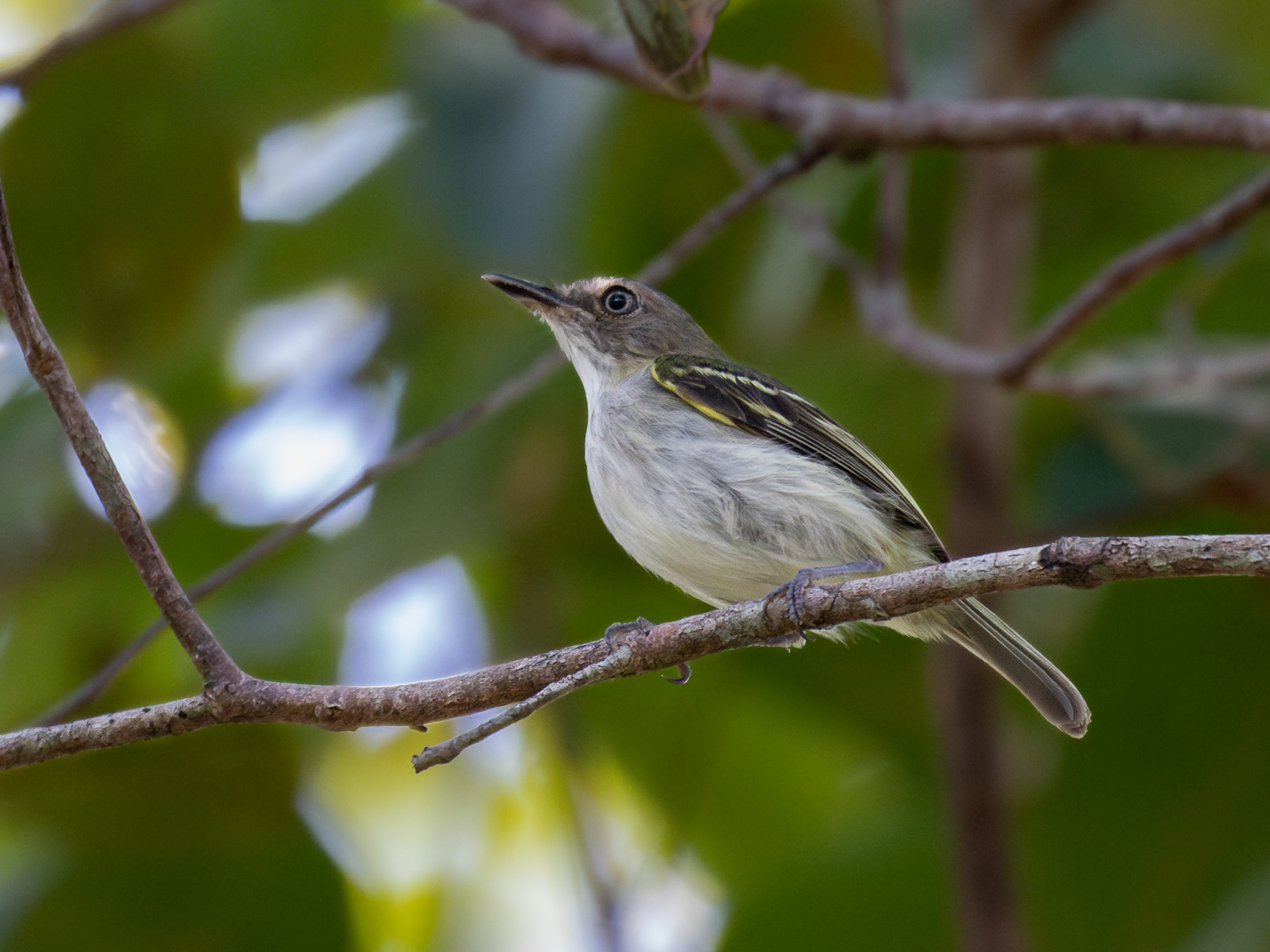

Conservation status
- Least Concern (IUCN 3.1)

Scientific classification
- Kingdom: Animalia
- Phylum: Chordata
- Class: Aves
- Order: Passeriformes
- Family: Tyrannidae
- Genus: Poecilotriccus
- Species: P. senex

Binomial name
- Poecilotriccus senex (Pelzeln, 1868)

Synonyms
- see text

= Buff-cheeked tody-flycatcher =

Species of bird

The buff-cheeked tody-flycatcher (Poecilotriccus senex) is a species of bird in the family Tyrannidae, the tyrant flycatchers. It is endemic to Brazil.

== Taxonomy and systematics ==
The buff-cheeked tody-flycatcher was originally described in 1868 as Euscarthmus senex. Since its description it was variously assigned to genera Platyrinchus and Todirostrum. Following a 1988 publication, taxonomic systems moved senex and several other species from Todirostrum to genus Poecilotriccus. By the early twenty-first century genus Poecilotriccus had species called both "tody-tyrant" and "tody-flycatcher" so taxonomic systems began renaming the "tyrants" to "flycatcher".

The buff-cheeked tody-flycatcher is monotypic.

== Description ==
The buff-cheeked tody-flycatcher is about 9 cm (3.5 in) long. Adult males have a slate-gray forehead and forecrown with black spots and a dark olive hindcrown whose feathers extend slightly to a crest. Their face is mostly light pinkish cinnamon. Their back, rump, and uppertail coverts are bright olive. Their wings are blackish with pale edges on the flight feathers and yellowish white tips on the coverts; the latter show as two wing bars. Their tail is blackish. Their throat and breast are mostly white with thin dark streaks on the throat that become olivaceous on the breast; there they are blurrier but still distinct. Their belly is pale yellow with the breast streaks extending into its upper part. Their bill, legs, and feet are dark. The female plumage has not been described.

== Distribution and habitat ==
The buff-cheeked tody-flycatcher was long known only from the type specimen that had been collected in 1830 at Borba in Amazonas state. It was re-found there in 1993. In the early twenty-first century it was also found in another part of Amazonas and in Rondônia. The species inhabits humid stunted forest along black-water rivers and in low-stature woodlands on white-sand soil.

== Behavior ==
=== Movement ===
The buff-cheeked tody-flycatcher is a year-round resident.

=== Feeding ===
The buff-cheeked tody-flycatcher forages towards the top of vegetation regardless of its height. Nothing else is known about its diet or feeding behavior.

=== Breeding ===
Nothing is known about the buff-cheeked tody-flycatcher's breeding biology.

=== Vocalization ===
The buff-cheeked tody-flycatcher's song is "a deep, churred trill 'djrrrt', usually preceded by a few 'chup' notes". It also sometimes "gives a series of some fifteen short 'djrrrt' notes, slightly descending in pitch".

== Status ==
The IUCN has assessed the buff-cheeked tody-flycatcher as being of Least Concern. It has a restricted range; its population size is not known and is believed to be decreasing. No immediate threats have been identified. It is considered fairly common in the vicinity of Borba. "Deforestation in Amazonas remains slight; nevertheless, because the area around Borba still supports extensive tracts of intact Amazonian forest and savannas, protection of these is a high priority."
