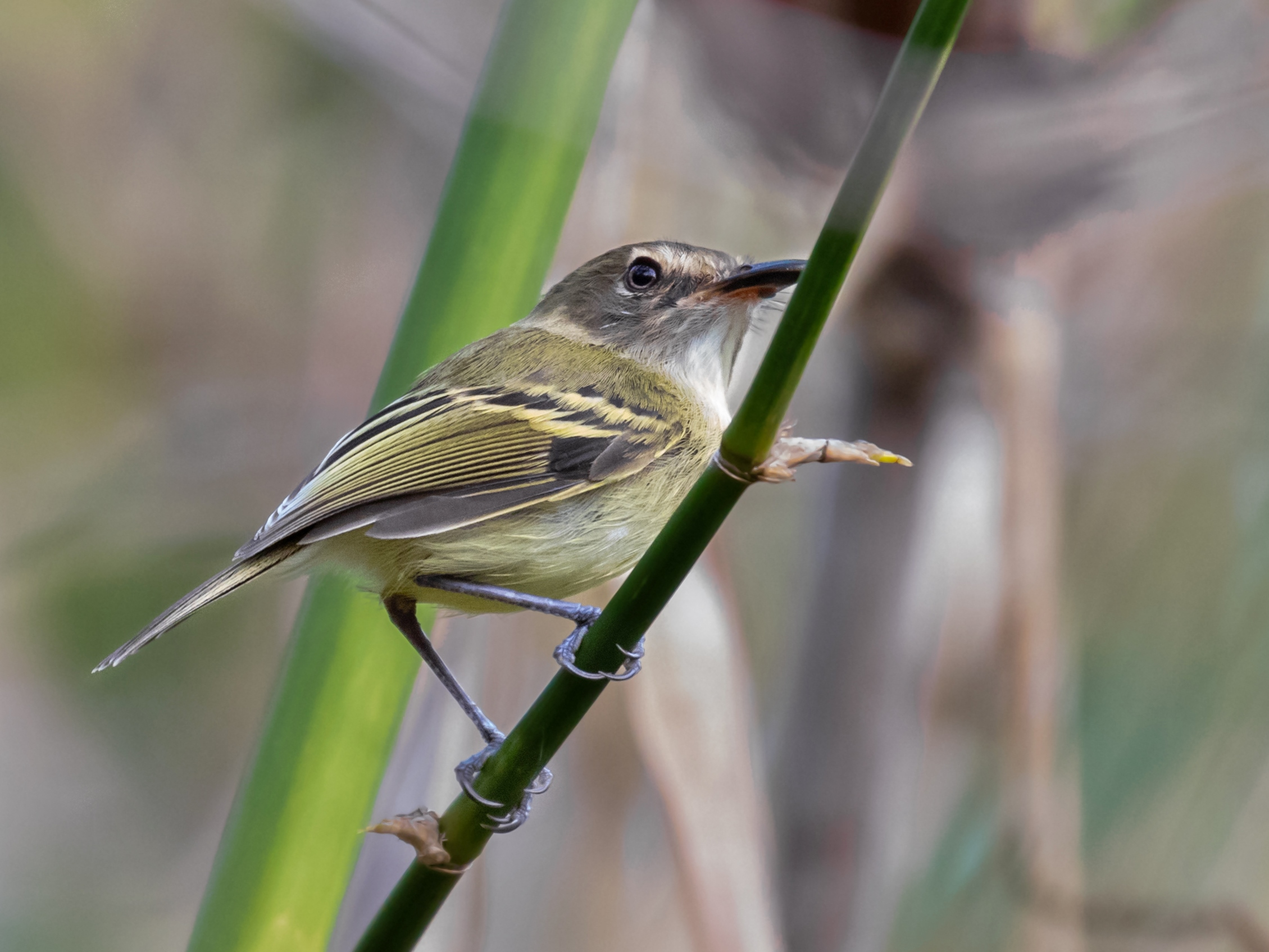

Conservation status
- Least Concern (IUCN 3.1)

Scientific classification
- Kingdom: Animalia
- Phylum: Chordata
- Class: Aves
- Order: Passeriformes
- Family: Tyrannidae
- Genus: Poecilotriccus
- Species: P. fumifrons

Binomial name
- Poecilotriccus fumifrons (Hartlaub, 1853)

Synonyms
- Todirostrum fumifrons

= Smoky-fronted tody-flycatcher =

Species of bird

The smoky-fronted tody-flycatcher (Poecilotriccus fumifrons) is a species of bird in the family Tyrannidae, the tyrant flycatchers. It is found in Brazil, French Guiana, Suriname, and Venezuela.

== Taxonomy and systematics ==
The smoky-fronted tody-flycatcher was originally described in 1853 as Todirostrum fumifrons. Following a 1988 publication, taxonomic systems moved fumifrons and several other species from Todirostrum to genus Poecilotriccus. By the early twenty-first century genus Poecilotriccus had species called both "tody-tyrant" and "tody-flycatcher" so taxonomic systems began renaming the "tyrants" to "flycatcher". The smoky-fronted tody-flycatcher shares genus Poecilotriccus with 11 other species. It and the rusty-fronted tody-flycatcher (P. latirostris) form a superspecies.

The smoky-fronted tody-flycatcher has two subspecies, the nominate P. f. fumifrons (Hartlaub, 1853) and P. f. penardi (Hellmayr, 1905).

== Description ==
The smoky-fronted tody-flycatcher is about 9 cm (3.5 in) long and weighs 6 to 7.2 g (0.21 to 0.25 oz). The sexes and the two subspecies have the same plumage. Adults have a smoky-gray forehead ("front") and an olive crown. Their face is mostly olive with dull buffish white above the lores and around the eye. Their back, rump, and uppertail coverts are olive. Their wings are blackish with yellowish edges on the flight feathers and buff-yellowish tips on the coverts; the latter show as two wing bars. Their tail is blackish. Their throat is whitish that becomes pale yellow on the breast and belly. Their breast has faint olive streaks and their sides have an olive tinge. They have a light red-brown iris, a black bill with a bit of white on the tip, and plumbeous legs and feet.

== Distribution and habitat ==
The smoky-fronted tody-flycatcher has a disjunct distribution. Subspecies P. f. penardi is the more northerly of the two. It is found primarily in Suriname and French Guiana. There is a record from southern Amazonas state and what is believed to be this subspecies has been recorded in southeastern Bolívar state, both in Venezuela. The nominate subspecies is found in two areas of Brazil. One is from central Pará east to southern Maranhão and south to northeastern Mato Grosso. The other is along the eastern coast from Paraíba south to northern Bahia.

The smoky-fronted tody-flycatcher inhabits dense shrubs and thickets along the edges of forest and in neglected pastures and clearings. It also occurs in bushes in savanna near forest. In elevation it ranges from sea level to 400 m (1,300 ft).

== Behavior ==
=== Movement ===
The smoky-fronted tody-flycatcher is believed to be a year-round resident.

=== Feeding ===
The smoky-fronted tody-flycatcher feeds on insects. It typically forages in pairs and is not known to join mixed-species feeding flocks. It mostly forages in dense vegetation and takes prey from foliage with short sallies from a perch.

=== Breeding ===
The smoky-fronted tody-flycatcher's breeding season has not been defined but includes March in Amazonian Brazil. Its one known nest was a bag with a side entrance hanging from the tip of a branch about 1 m (3 ft) above the ground. It contained two nestlings that were predated by bullet ants (Paraponera clavata). The usual clutch size, incubation period, time to fledging, and details of parental care are not known.

=== Vocalization ===
The smoky-fronted tody-flycatcher's song is an "[a]lmost toneless low rattling 'kerrr' trill" that is repeated a few times when agitated. It is "usually preceded by one to several 'tic' notes".

== Status ==
The IUCN has assessed the smoky-fronted tody-flycatcher as being of Least Concern. It has a large range; its population size is not known and is believed to be decreasing. No immediate threats have been identified. It is considered rare to uncommon overall but fairly common in parts of Suriname. It is found in a few protected areas.
