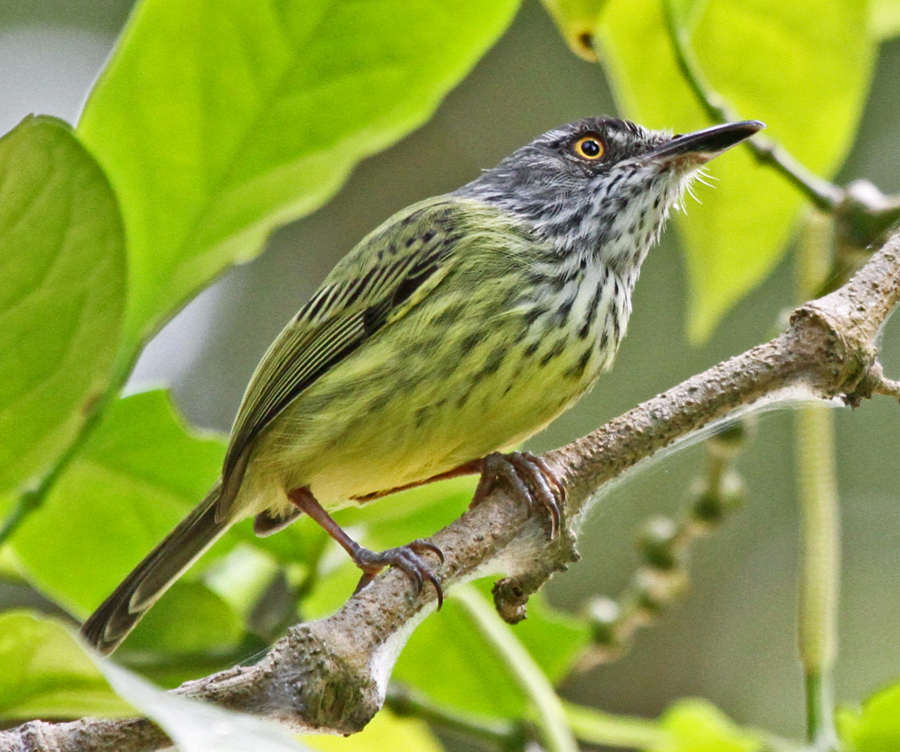
- In Belém, Pará, Brazil

Conservation status
- Least Concern (IUCN 3.1)

Scientific classification
- Kingdom: Animalia
- Phylum: Chordata
- Class: Aves
- Order: Passeriformes
- Family: Tyrannidae
- Genus: Todirostrum
- Species: T. maculatum

Binomial name
- Todirostrum maculatum (Desmarest, 1806)

= Spotted tody-flycatcher =

Species of bird

The spotted tody-flycatcher (Todirostrum maculatum) is a species of bird in the family Tyrannidae, the tyrant flycatchers. It is found on Trinidad and in every mainland South American country except Argentina, Chile, Paraguay, and Uruguay.

== Taxonomy and systematics ==
The spotted tody-flycatcher was originally described in 1806 as Todus maculatus.

The spotted tody-flycatcher has these five subspecies:

- T. m. amacurense Eisenmann & Phelps, WH Jr, 1971
- T. m. maculatum (Desmarest, 1806)
- T. m. signatum Sclater, PL & Salvin, 1881
- T. m. diversum Zimmer, JT, 1940
- T. m. annectens Zimmer, JT, 1940

== Description ==
The spotted tody-flycatcher is 8.9 to 10.2 cm (3.5 to 4.0 in) long and weighs 6.4 to 8.3 g (0.23 to 0.29 oz). The sexes have the same plumage. Adults of the nominate subspecies T. m. maculatum have a mostly gray head with a small white spot above the lores and some black and white streaks on the crown. Their back, rump, and uppertail coverts are olive. Their wings are brownish black with yellow edges on the flight feathers and yellowish edges and tips on the coverts; the last sometimes show as pale wing bars. Their tail is brownish black with yellow-white edges on the outer webs of the outer feathers. Their throat and upper breast are white with narrow black streaks. Their belly is mostly yellow with dark olive streaks on the sides. Immatures are very like adults but with thinner and lighter streaks. Subspecies T. m. amacurense and T. m. signatum have sooty-black crowns but are otherwise like the nominate. T. m. diversum and T. m. annectens have the same plumage as the nominate. Both sexes of all subspecies usually have a yellowish orange iris though sometimes gray or brown. They have a black bill with some white on the mandible and pinkish gray legs and feet.

== Distribution and habitat ==
The spotted tody-flycatcher is a bird of the Amazon Basin and coastal northern South America. Its range circles but does not include the Guiana Shield. The subspecies are found thus:

- T. m. amacurense: Trinidad, northeastern Venezuela from Sucre to Delta Amacuro, and into northern Guyana
- T. m. maculatum: Suriname, French Guiana, and in northeastern Brazil's Amapá, eastern Pará, and northern Maranhão states east of the Xingu River
- T. m. signatum: from southeastern Colombia's Caquetá and Putumayo departments south through eastern Ecuador and eastern Peru into northwestern Bolivia and east from them into the western parts of Amazonas and Rondônia in western Brazil
- T. m. diversum: central Brazil north of the Amazon between the Negro and Nhamundá rivers and south of the Amazon from the Tefé River east to the Tapajos River
- T. m. annectens: northern Brazil from the Branco River and northeastern Amazonas south to where the Negro meets the Amazon.

The spotted tody-flycatcher primarily inhabits wet landscapes such as mangroves along the northern coast, and in the interior in dense thickets along oxbow lakes, small and medium-size watercourses, and major rivers and their islands. It also occurs in somewhat more open shrubby areas such as clearings in the forest and abandoned pastures, and has also been found in household gardens and in grassy areas with young Cecropia. In elevation it ranges overall up to 500 m (1,600 ft) though only to 400 m (1,300 ft) in Colombia, 250 m (800 ft) in Ecuador, and 100 m (300 ft) in Venezuela.

== Behavior ==
=== Movement ===
The spotted tody-flycatcher is believed to be a year-round resident.

=== Feeding ===
The spotted tody-flycatcher feeds on arthropods, though details are lacking. It typically forages in pairs and has not been observed to join mixed-species feeding flocks. It mostly forages in dense vegetation near the ground but sometimes ascends higher. It primarily takes prey from foliage, vines, and branches with short upward sallies from a perch.

=== Breeding ===
The spotted tody-flycatcher's breeding season has not been defined but overall has included every month. Both sexes build the nest, a longish pouch with a side entrance under a "roof". It is made from grasses and other plant fibers held together with spider web and lined with plant wool. It typically hangs from a branch within about 3 m (10 ft) of the ground and often near a wasp nest. The clutch is one or two red-dotted white eggs that the female alone incubates. The incubation period is 16 to 21 days and fledging occurs 15 to 19 days after hatch.

=== Vocal and non-vocal sounds ===
The spotted tody-flycatcher's song is an "extr. high, slow, staccato series of evenly spaced, slightly descending notes, often each note doubled in duet". It also makes "extr. high, short, dry trills and twitters". Prey capture is accompanied by an audible bill snap.

== Status ==
The IUCN has assessed the spotted tody-flycatcher as being of Least Concern. It has an extremely large range; its population size is not known and is believed to be stable. No immediate threats have been identified. It is considered fairly common to common overall and "very local" in Colombia, local in Ecuador, and common in Peru. It occurs in many protected areas and can "thrive in secondary and converted habitats".
