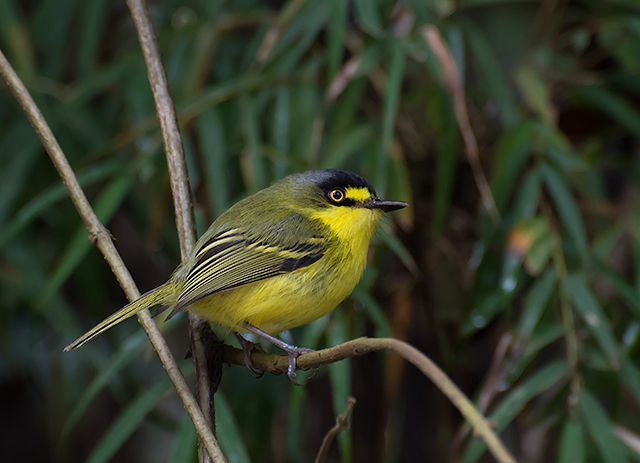

Conservation status
- Least Concern (IUCN 3.1)

Scientific classification
- Kingdom: Animalia
- Phylum: Chordata
- Class: Aves
- Order: Passeriformes
- Family: Tyrannidae
- Genus: Todirostrum
- Species: T. poliocephalum

Binomial name
- Todirostrum poliocephalum (Wied, 1831)

= Yellow-lored tody-flycatcher =

Species of bird

The yellow-lored tody-flycatcher, or gray-headed tody-flycatcher, (Todirostrum poliocephalum) is a species of bird in the family Tyrannidae, the tyrant flycatchers. It is endemic to Brazil.

== Taxonomy and systematics ==
The yellow-lored tody-flycatcher was originally described by Prince Maximilian of Wied-Neuwied in 1831 as Todus poliocephalus. He called it "Der grauköpfige Plattschanbel" which roughly translates to "grey-headed flatbill". It was later moved to genus Triccus and still later to its current Todirostrum.

The yellow-lored tody-flycatcher is monotypic.

== Description ==
The yellow-lored tody-flycatcher is 8.8 to 10.2 cm (3.5 to 4.0 in) long and weighs about 5 to 6 g (0.18 to 0.21 oz). The sexes have the same plumage. Adults have a slate-gray crown and nape, large lemon yellow or sulphur yellow patches on the lores with a black stripe below them, and greenish cheeks. Their back, rump, and uppertail coverts are "siskin-green" (Wied's term) or olive. Their wings are black-brown with yellow-green edges on the flight feathers and yellow or olive edges on the coverts; the last show as two wing bars. Their tail is dark grayish brown with olive-green edges on the feathers. Their entire underparts are lemon yellow or sulphur yellow. Juveniles have pale yellow lores with a grayish stripe under them and paler yellow underparts than adults. Adults have a yellow-orange iris, a spatula-shaped black-brown bill, and bluish gray legs and feet. Juveniles have a gray-brown iris, a gray bill, and bluish gray legs and feet.

== Distribution and habitat ==
The yellow-lored tody-flycatcher is found in southeastern Brazil from southeastern Bahia south to far northeastern Rio Grande do Sul and inland into Minas Gerais and northern Paraná. A few are also found in Goiás; that population is suspected of originating from escaped or released captive birds. The species primarily inhabits a variety of forest types but is typically found in dense vegetation along the forest edge. It also occurs in somewhat more open areas such as light woodland, gardens, and urban parks. Close to the coast it often is found in humid secondary forest and forest fragments. Further inland it occurs in semi-deciduous forest, gallery forest, and also fragmented forest. In elevation it ranges from sea level to 1,200 m (3,900 ft).

== Behavior ==
=== Movement ===
The yellow-lored tody-flycatcher is believed to be a year-round resident.

=== Feeding ===
The yellow-lored tody-flycatcher feeds on insects, though details are lacking. It typically forages in pairs, though sometimes singly or in small family groups, and rarely joins mixed-species feeding flocks. It mostly forages in dense vegetation near the ground but sometimes ascends higher. It primarily takes prey from foliage with short upward sallies from a perch.

=== Breeding ===
The yellow-lored tody-flycatcher breeds in the austral spring and summer, mostly between August and November. Its nest is an oval closed bag with a side entrance described as "compact" unlike the "untidy" nests of some other Todirostrum species. The female alone is believed to build the nest, using dry leaves, strips of bark, and other plant materials bound with spider web. Nests typically hang from the tip of a branch up to about 4 m (13 ft) above the ground, are usually well hidden, and are often suspended over water. The clutch is two or three eggs that are pale salmon with small reddish brown patches. In one nest incubation lasted at least 17 days. The typical incubation period, time to fledging, and details of parental care are not known.

=== Vocal and non-vocal sounds ===
The yellow-lored tody-flycatcher's song is an "extr. high, weak, 'twit' followed by even higher, energetic 'witwit---' ('wit' 4-6 x)". Other authors have written it as "spit-spit-spit-spit", "cheep, chip-chip", and "teck-teck-k-k-k". Prey capture is accompanied by an audible bill snap.

== Status ==
The IUCN has assessed the yellow-lored tody-flycatcher as being of Least Concern. It has a large range; its population size is not known and is believed to be decreasing. No immediate threats have been identified. It occurs in many protected areas. "Todirostrum poliocephalum shows low sensitivity to disturbance, but depends on remaining forest fragments, including selectively logged and secondary forest."
