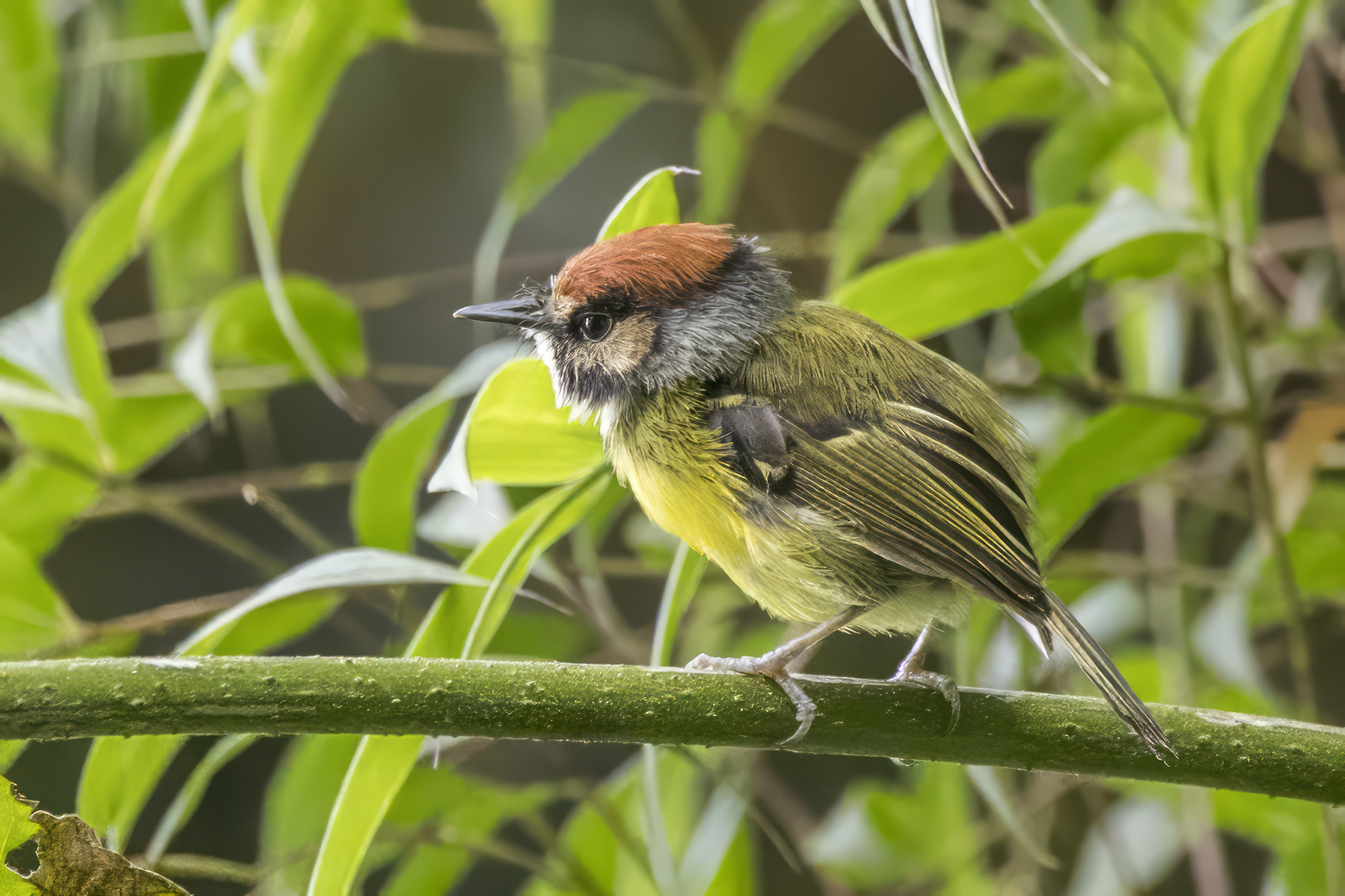
- P. r. melanomystax, Colombia
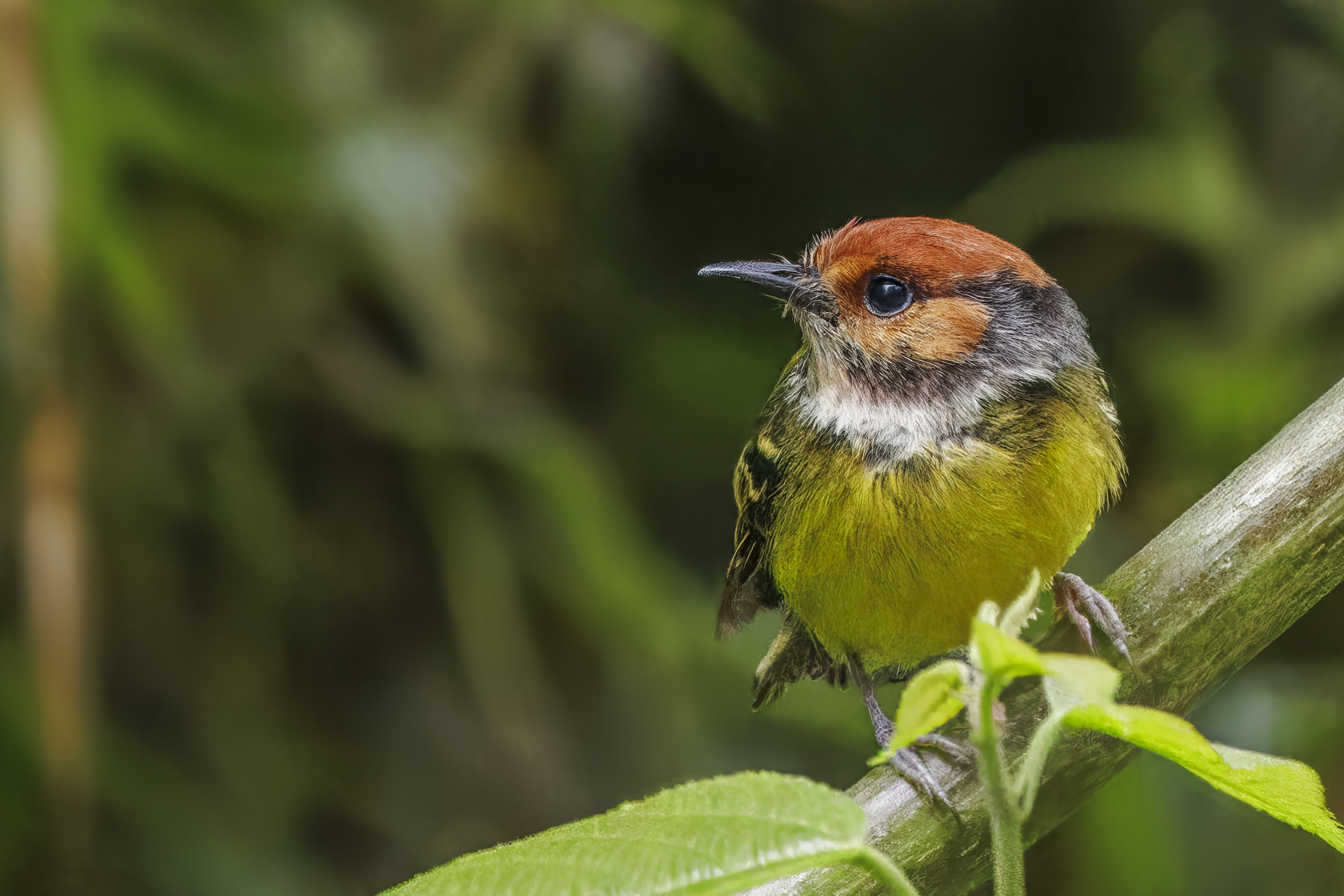
- P. r. rufigenis, Ecuador

Conservation status
- Least Concern (IUCN 3.1)

Scientific classification
- Kingdom: Animalia
- Phylum: Chordata
- Class: Aves
- Order: Passeriformes
- Family: Tyrannidae
- Genus: Poecilotriccus
- Species: P. ruficeps

Binomial name
- Poecilotriccus ruficeps (Kaup, 1852)

= Rufous-crowned tody-flycatcher =

Species of bird

The rufous-crowned tody-flycatcher (Poecilotriccus ruficeps) is a species of bird in the family Tyrannidae, the tyrant flycatchers. It is found in Colombia, Ecuador, Peru, and Venezuela.

== Taxonomy and systematics ==
The rufous-crowned tody-flycatcher was originally described as Todirostrum ruficeps. Genus Poecilotriccus was erected for it and several other species in 1884. The species was long called the rufous-crowned tody-tyrant. By the early twenty-first century genus Poecilotriccus had species called both "tody-tyrant" and "tody-flycatcher" so taxonomic systems began renaming the "tyrants" to "flycatcher".

The rufous-crowned tody-flycatcher has these four subspecies:

- P. r. melanomystax Hellmayr, 1927
- P. r. ruficeps (Kaup, 1852)
- P. r. rufigenis (Sclater, PL & Salvin, 1877)
- P. r. peruvianus Chapman, 1924

One author has suggested that two or more of the subspecies may represent full species.

== Description ==
The rufous-crowned tody-flycatcher is about 9 to 10 cm (3.5 to 3.9 in) long and weighs about 6.6 g (0.23 oz). The sexes have the same plumage. Adults of the nominate subspecies P. r. ruficeps have a bright rufous crown and a gray nape that are separated by a black line that continues onto the cheek. They have a white to buffy area above the lores, a thin black line through the eye, and white to buffy cheeks. Their back, rump, and uppertail coverts are olive. Their wings are black with yellowish white edges on the flight feathers and yellow tips on the coverts; the latter show as two thin wing bars. Their tail is olive-brown. Their throat and upper breast are buffy whitish with a faint dusky or blackish band under the breast. The rest of their underparts are bright yellow. Juveniles have paler throats than adults. Subspecies P. r. rufigenis has a very faint or no black line on the cheek. P. r. peruvianus has bolder black markings on the face and a whiter throat than the nominate. P. r. melanomystax has whitish cheeks; the black line on the nape widens onto the sides of the neck. All subspecies have a dark brown iris, a black bill, and gray legs and feet.

== Distribution and habitat ==
The rufous-crowned tody-flycatcher has a disjunct distribution. The subspecies are found thus:

- P. r. melanomystax: Andes in northern Mérida and eastern Trujillo states in western Venezuela and south in Colombia's Eastern Andes of Cundinamarca Department and Central Andes to Valle del Cauca Department
- P. r. ruficeps: from southern Táchira in far southwestern Venezuela south through all three ranges of the Colombian Andes and the east slope of the Andes of Ecuador to Loja Province (perhaps also in the Serranía del Perijá of Colombia.)
- P. r. rufigenis: western slope of the Andes from Nariño Department in far southwestern Colombia and into Ecuador as far as Azuay Province
- P. r. peruvianus: from Loja and Zamora-Chinchipe provinces in Ecuador into Peru's Piura and Cajamarca departments

The rufous-crowned tody-flycatcher inhabits shrubby and brushy areas at the edges and in clearings of primary and secondary forest, in overgrown pastures, and along watercourses and roads. It also favors stands of bamboo. It is not found in the forest interior. In elevation it ranges between 1,800 and 2,900 m (5,900 and 9,500 ft) in Venezuela, 1,500 and 2,700 m (4,900 and 8,900 ft) in Colombia, 1,500 and 2,500 m (4,900 and 8,200 ft) in Ecuador, and 2,400 and 2,900 m (7,900 and 9,500 ft) in Peru.

== Behavior ==
=== Movement ===
The rufous-crowned tody-flycatcher is a year-round resident.

=== Feeding ===
The rufous-crowned tody-flycatcher feeds on insects. It forages singly, in pairs, and in small family groups and only rarely joins mixed-species feeding flocks. It forages mostly near the ground in dense vegetation. It takes prey with short upward or forward sallies from a perch to grab it from leaves.

=== Breeding ===
The rufous-crowned tody-flycatcher's breeding season has not been defined but appears to include March to September. Nothing else is known about the species' breeding biology.

=== Vocalization ===
The rufous-crowned tody-flycatcher's vocalizations are "soft, easily overlooked, and usually given only at well-spaced intervals". Its song has been described as a sputtering "pa-treer-pít-pít-pít" with some variation. Its calls include "a gravelly stuttered 'tttrew', 'pit-tttrew', or 'tttrew-pit', sometimes given as a duet". Other calls are described as a "low-pitched, flat chak, chak", a "gravelly stick'di'dik", and an "abrupt pip'prrrrrr".

== Status ==
The IUCN has assessed the rufous-crowned tody-flycatcher as being of Least Concern. It has a large range; its population size is not known and is believed to be decreasing. No immediate threats have been identified. It is known from only a few specimens and sight records in Venezuela. It is considered fairly common in Colombia, common in Ecuador, and uncommon in Peru. It occurs in several national parks but is "[p]robably declining because of habitat loss".
