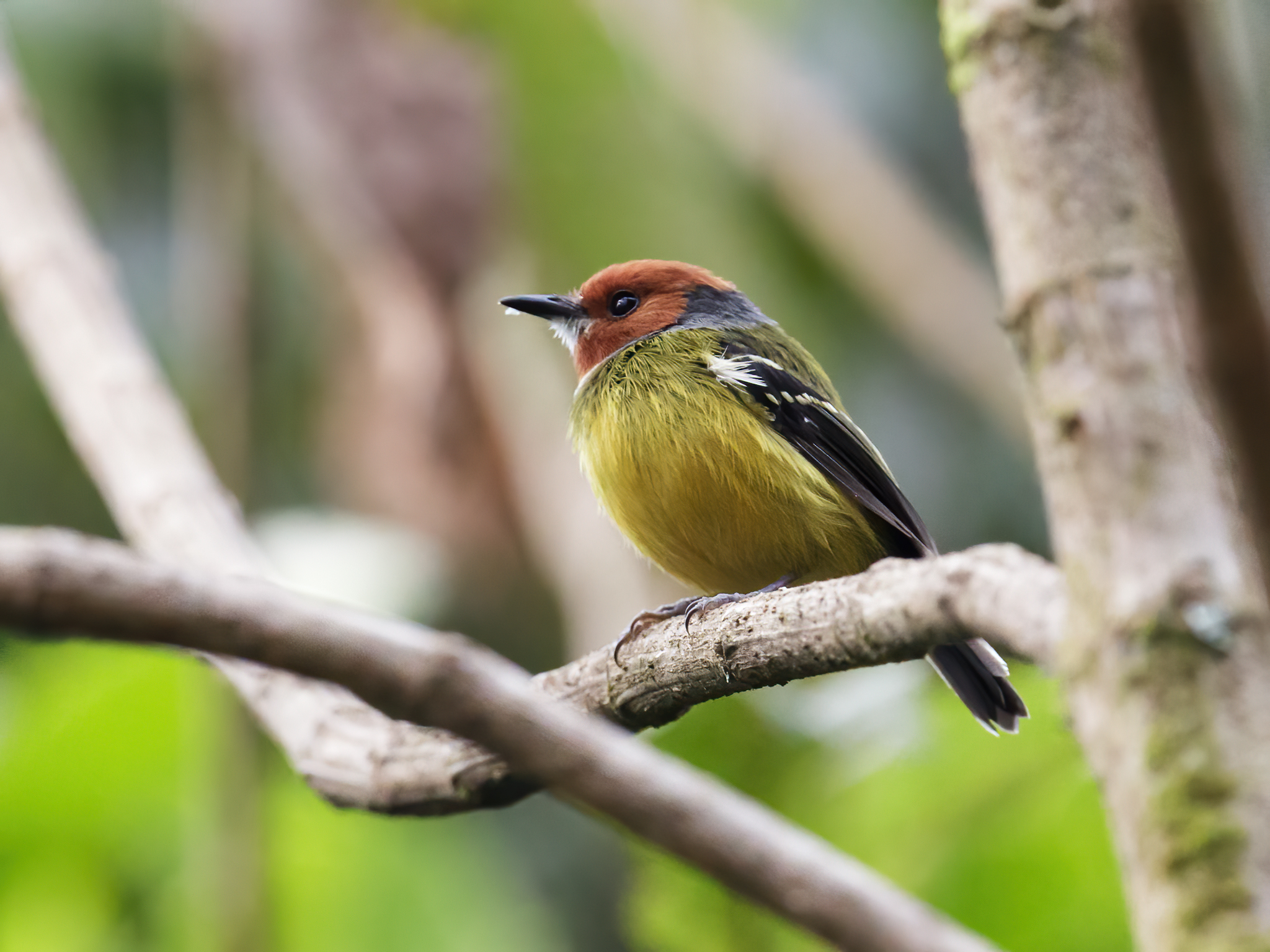

Conservation status
- Least Concern (IUCN 3.1)

Scientific classification
- Kingdom: Animalia
- Phylum: Chordata
- Class: Aves
- Order: Passeriformes
- Family: Tyrannidae
- Genus: Poecilotriccus
- Species: P. luluae

Binomial name
- Poecilotriccus luluae Johnson & Jones, 2001

= Lulu's tody-flycatcher =

Species of bird

Lulu's tody-flycatcher (Poecilotriccus luluae), also known as Johnson's tody-flycatcher, is a species of bird in the family Tyrannidae, the tyrant flycatchers. It is endemic to Peru.

== Taxonomy and systematics ==
The type specimen of Lulu's tody-flycatcher was collected in 1970. By the early 1980s enough additional specimens had been collected for the initial collectors to formally describe the new species. They named it "Lulu's Tody-Tyrant"; this English name and the specific epithet luluae honor Lulu May Von Hagen "in recognition of her generous and dedicated support of research in avian genetics". Two years after Ned Johnson and Robert Jones described the species, Johnson died. The South American Classification Committee of the American Ornithological Society almost immediately proposed and accepted changing the English name to "Johnson's Tody-Tyrant". The Clements taxonomy also accepted the name change. However, as of late 2024 the International Ornithological Committee and BirdLife International's Handbook of the Birds of the World retain "Lulu's". By the time of the English name change, genus Poecilotriccus had species called both "tody-tyrant" and "tody-flycatcher", so in 2008 taxonomic systems began renaming the "tyrants" to "flycatcher".

Lulu's tody-flycatcher is monotypic.

== Description ==
Lulu's tody-flycatcher is about 9.5 cm (3.7 in) long and weighs about 7.3 g (0.26 oz). The sexes have the same plumage. Adults have a mostly pale rufous or cinnamon head and throat with a gray band across the nape that thins as it passes forward under the ear coverts. Their back, rump, and uppertail coverts are yellowish olive green. Their wings are black with yellow or yellowish olive green edges on the flight feathers and buff or buff yellow tips on the coverts; the latter show as two thin wing bars. Their chin is white and their throat pale rufous or cinnamon with a thin white band below it. Their breast is yellowish olive green and the rest of their underparts are orange yellow or yellow ochre. They have a brown or dark brown iris, a black bill, and legs and feet whose color can be any of several shades of gray.

== Distribution and habitat ==
Lulu's tody-flycatcher is found in northern Peru, south of the Marañón River in southern Amazonas and western San Martín departments. It primarily inhabits the understory of humid montane forest, where it heavily favors thickets of bamboo, but is also found in secondary forest. In elevation it ranges between 1,850 and 2,900 m (6,100 and 9,500 ft).

== Behavior ==
=== Movement ===
Lulu's tody-flycatcher is a year-round resident.

=== Feeding ===
Lulu's tody-flycatcher feeds on insects, though details of its diet are lacking. It forages mostly in pairs and only briefly joins mixed-species feeding flocks that pass nearby. It forages mostly between about 4 and 10 m (15 and 35 ft) above the ground. It takes prey with short upward sallies from a perch to grab it from leaves, small branches, and bamboo stalks. It also takes prey by gleaning while perched.

=== Breeding ===
Beyond that a Lulu's tody-flycatcher was seen carrying nesting material in December, nothing is known about the species' breeding biology.

=== Vocalization ===
The song of Lulu's tody-flycatcher is "a descending, whinnying chatter: djee-djee'trrrrr" and its calls are "a rising, staccato rattle: trr'rr'rr; also a quiet, froglike prrp".

== Status ==
The IUCN originally in 2004 assessed Lulu's tody-flycatcher as Vulnerable, then in 2012 as Endangered, and since February 2024 as being of Least Concern. It has a limited range and its estimated population of between 2500 and 10,000 mature individuals is believed to be stable. No immediate threats have been identified. Authors have variously considered it uncommon, uncommon and local, and locally fairly common. "Deforestation in the Andes of northern Peru unquestionably is a serious problem. At least in the short term, however, Johnson's Tody-Flycatcher may benefit from deforestation, since this species readily occupies second growth and bamboo at forest edge."
