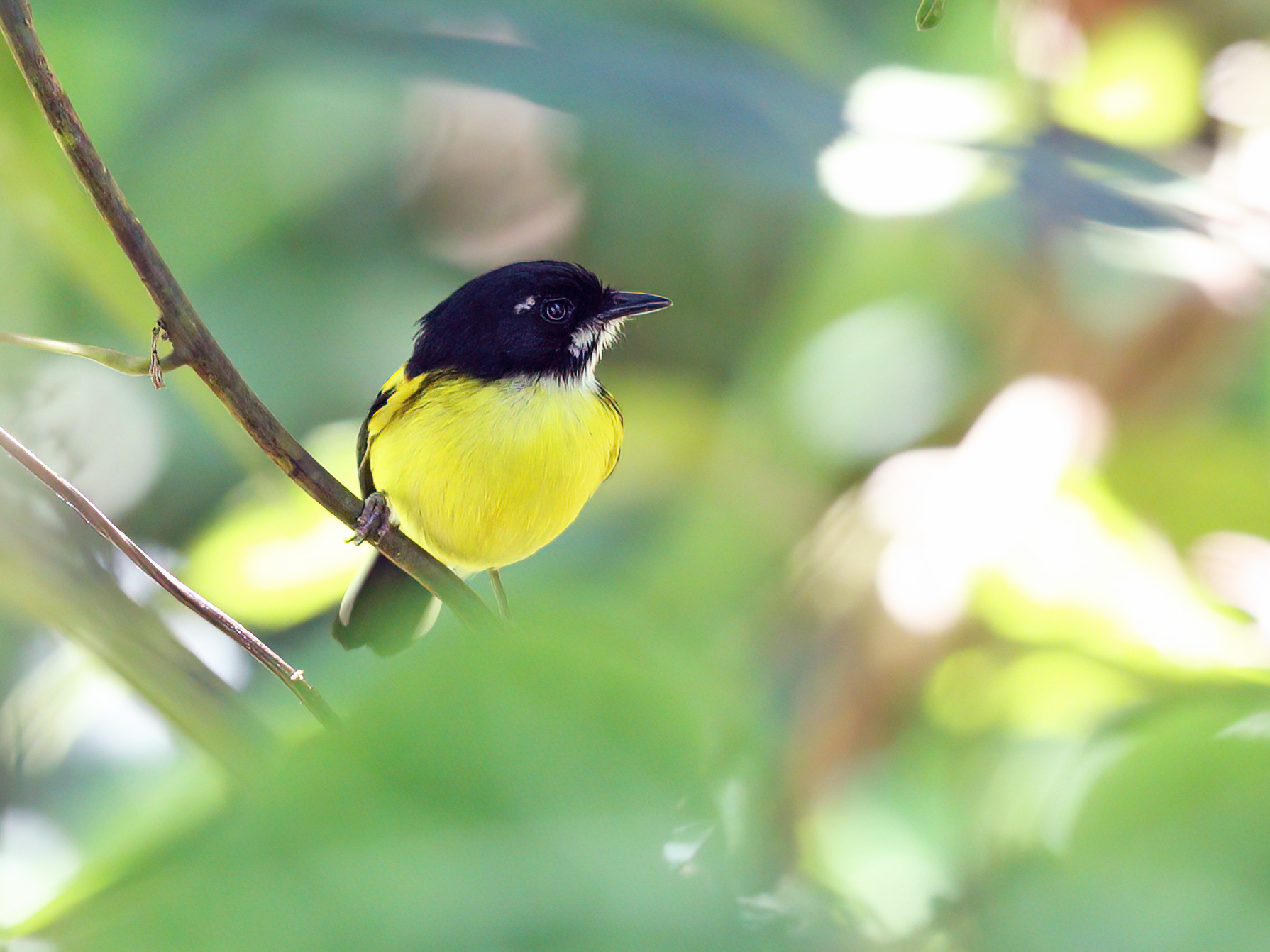

Conservation status
- Least Concern (IUCN 3.1)

Scientific classification
- Kingdom: Animalia
- Phylum: Chordata
- Class: Aves
- Order: Passeriformes
- Family: Tyrannidae
- Genus: Poecilotriccus
- Species: P. pulchellus

Binomial name
- Poecilotriccus pulchellus (Sclater, PL, 1874)

Synonyms
- Todirostrum pulchellum; Poecilotriccus pulchellum

= Black-backed tody-flycatcher =

Species of bird

The black-backed tody-flycatcher (Poecilotriccus pulchellus) is a species of bird in the family Tyrannidae, the tyrant flycatchers. It is endemic to Peru.

== Taxonomy and systematics ==
The black-backed tody-flycatcher was originally described in 1874 as Todirostrum puchellum. Following a 1988 publication, taxonomic systems moved puchellum and several other species from Todirostrum to genus Poecilotriccus. By the early twenty-first century genus Poecilotriccus had species called both "tody-tyrant" and "tody-flycatcher" so taxonomic systems began renaming the "tyrants" to "flycatcher". The black-backed tody-flycatcher shares genus Poecilotriccus with 11 other species.

The black-backed tody-flycatcher is monotypic. However, during the twentieth century several authors treated it and the golden-winged tody-flycatcher (P. calopterus) as conspecific.

== Description ==
The black-backed tody-flycatcher is about 9.5 cm (3.7 in) long; one male weighed 8.7 g (0.31 oz) and one female 7.2 g (0.25 oz). Adult males have a mostly black head with a white spot behind the eye, a white "moustache", and a white throat. Their back, rump, and uppertail coverts are black. Their wings are black with yellowish white edges on the inner feathers. Their lesser wing coverts are chestnut and the median coverts bright yellow; the former show on the shoulder and the latter show as a wing bar. Their shortish tail is black. Their breast and belly are bright yellow. Adult females are similar to males with the addition of a white spot on the lores and a dark olive or sooty olive back rather than a black one. Both sexes have a light brown or light gray iris, a long, flattened, black bill, and gray, dark gray, or brownish gray legs and feet.

The black-backed tody-flycatcher is most similar to the golden-winged tody-flycatcher, with a major difference being that both sexes of the golden-winged have an olive back. Their ranges do not overlap. The common tody-flycatcher (Todirostrum cinereum) is also similar but has much less dramatic wing colors, a yellow throat, and a pale iris; in addition it inhabits a wider range of landscapes.

== Distribution and habitat ==
The black-backed tody-flycatcher is found only in southeastern Peru from northern Cuzco Department south to northern Puno Department. It inhabits dense shrubby vegetation on the edges of humid evergreen forest both primary and secondary and also nearby overgrown fields and gardens. In elevation it ranges between 400 and 1,500 m (1,300 and 4,900 ft).

== Behavior ==
=== Movement ===
The black-backed tody-flycatcher is a year-round resident.

=== Feeding ===
The black-backed tody-flycatcher feeds on insects, though details are lacking. It typically forages in pairs and does not join mixed-species feeding flocks. It mostly forages in dense vegetation within a few meters of the ground. It primarily takes prey from foliage with short upward sallies from a perch.

=== Breeding ===
Nothing is known about the black-backed tody-flycatcher's breeding biology.

=== Vocalization ===
The black-backed tody-flycatcher's song is "a rapid series of descending, rich, sputtered churrs: djerr djeer djeer djeer… or bisyllabic we'djerr we'djerr we'djerr…." The singer usually flashes its wings while singing, and often pairs sing in duet.

== Status ==
The IUCN has assessed the black-backed tody-flycatcher as being of Least Concern. It has a small range; its population size is not known and is believed to be decreasing. No immediate threats have been identified though habitat loss is a potential threat. It is considered uncommon. "Given that this species occupies habitats (dense understory tangles) that are frequent at forest edge, however, it also is possible that this species may be increasing in abundance or expanding its range in the lowlands, in response to clearing for agriculture along riverbanks."
