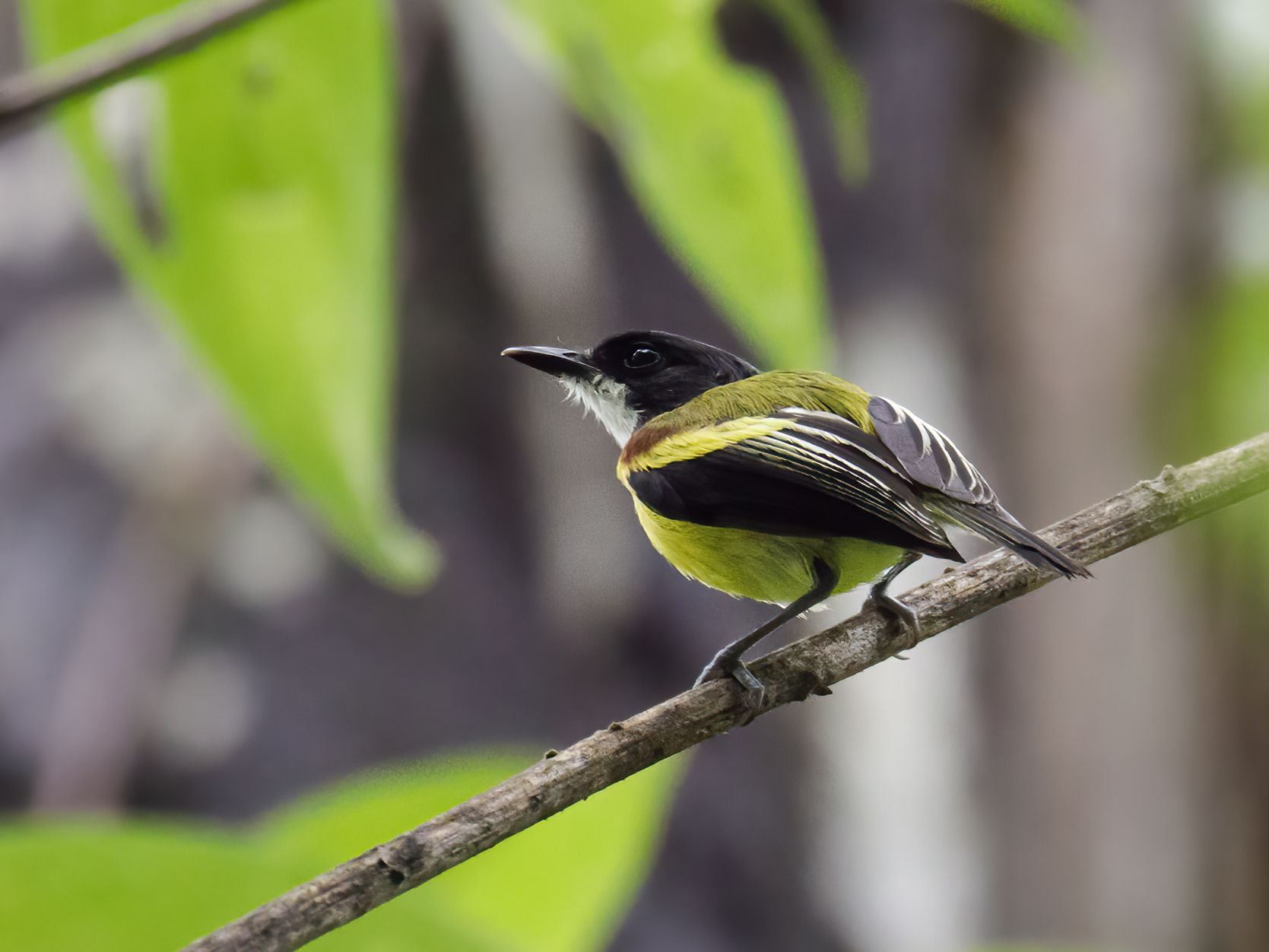

Conservation status
- Least Concern (IUCN 3.1)

Scientific classification
- Kingdom: Animalia
- Phylum: Chordata
- Class: Aves
- Order: Passeriformes
- Family: Tyrannidae
- Genus: Poecilotriccus
- Species: P. calopterus

Binomial name
- Poecilotriccus calopterus (Sclater, PL, 1857)

Synonyms
- Todirostrum calopterum; Poecilotriccus calopterum

= Golden-winged tody-flycatcher =

Species of bird

The golden-winged tody-flycatcher (Poecilotriccus calopterus) is a species of bird in the family Tyrannidae, the tyrant flycatchers. It is found in Colombia, Ecuador, and Peru.

== Taxonomy and systematics ==
The golden-winged tody-flycatcher was originally described in 1857 as Todirostrum calopterum. Following a 1988 publication, taxonomic systems moved calopterus and several other species from Todirostrum to genus Poecilotriccus. By the early twenty-first century genus Poecilotriccus had species called both "tody-tyrant" and "tody-flycatcher" so taxonomic systems began renaming the "tyrants" to "flycatcher". The golden-winged tody-flycatcher shares genus Poecilotriccus with 11 other species.

The golden-winged tody-flycatcher is monotypic. However, during the twentieth century several authors treated it and the black-backed tody-flycatcher (P. pulchellus) as conspecific.

== Description ==
The golden-winged tody-flycatcher is about 9.5 cm (3.7 in) long and weighs about 6 g (0.21 oz). The sexes have the same plumage. Adults have a mostly black head with a white throat. Their back, rump, and uppertail coverts are olive green. Their wings are black with yellowish white edges on the inner flight feathers. Their lesser wing coverts are chestnut and the median coverts bright yellow; the former show on the shoulder and the latter show as two wing bars. Their tail is black. Their breast and belly are bright yellow. They have a brown iris, a black bill, and blue-gray legs and feet.

== Distribution and habitat ==
The golden-winged tody-flycatcher is found from Putumayo and Amazonas departments in southern Colombia south on the east slope of the Andes through most of Ecuador and east in northern Peru to central Loreto Department. It inhabits dense shrubby vegetation on the edges and in clearings of humid evergreen forest both primary and secondary and also nearby overgrown fields and gardens. In elevation it ranges between 300 and 1,100 m (1,000 and 3,600 ft) in Colombia, up to 1,300 m (4,300 ft) in Ecuador, and up to 600 m (2,000 ft) in Peru.

== Behavior ==
=== Movement ===
The golden-winged tody-flycatcher is a year-round resident.

=== Feeding ===
The golden-winged tody-flycatcher feeds on insects, though details are lacking. It typically forages in pairs and does not join mixed-species feeding flocks. It mostly forages in dense vegetation within a few meters of the ground. It primarily takes prey from foliage with short upward sallies from a perch; it also takes it while briefly hovering after a short flight.

=== Breeding ===
Nothing is known about the golden-winged tody-flycatcher's breeding biology.

=== Vocalization ===
The golden-winged tody-flycatcher's call is distinctive, "a dry, gravelly, almost sputtering 'dre'd'd'd'deu' or 'p-drrrew' " that is often quickly repeated several times. Sometimes both members of a pair vocalize in duet.

== Status ==
The IUCN has assessed the golden-winged tody-flycatcher as being of Least Concern. It has a large range; its population size is not known and is believed to be decreasing. No immediate threats have been identified. It is considered uncommon in Colombia, mostly common but only local in the far east in Ecuador, and uncommon and local in Peru. "Given that this species occupies habitats (dense understory tangles) that are frequent at forest edge, however, it also is possible that this species may be increasing in abundance or expanding its range in the lowlands, in response to clearing for agriculture along riverbanks."
