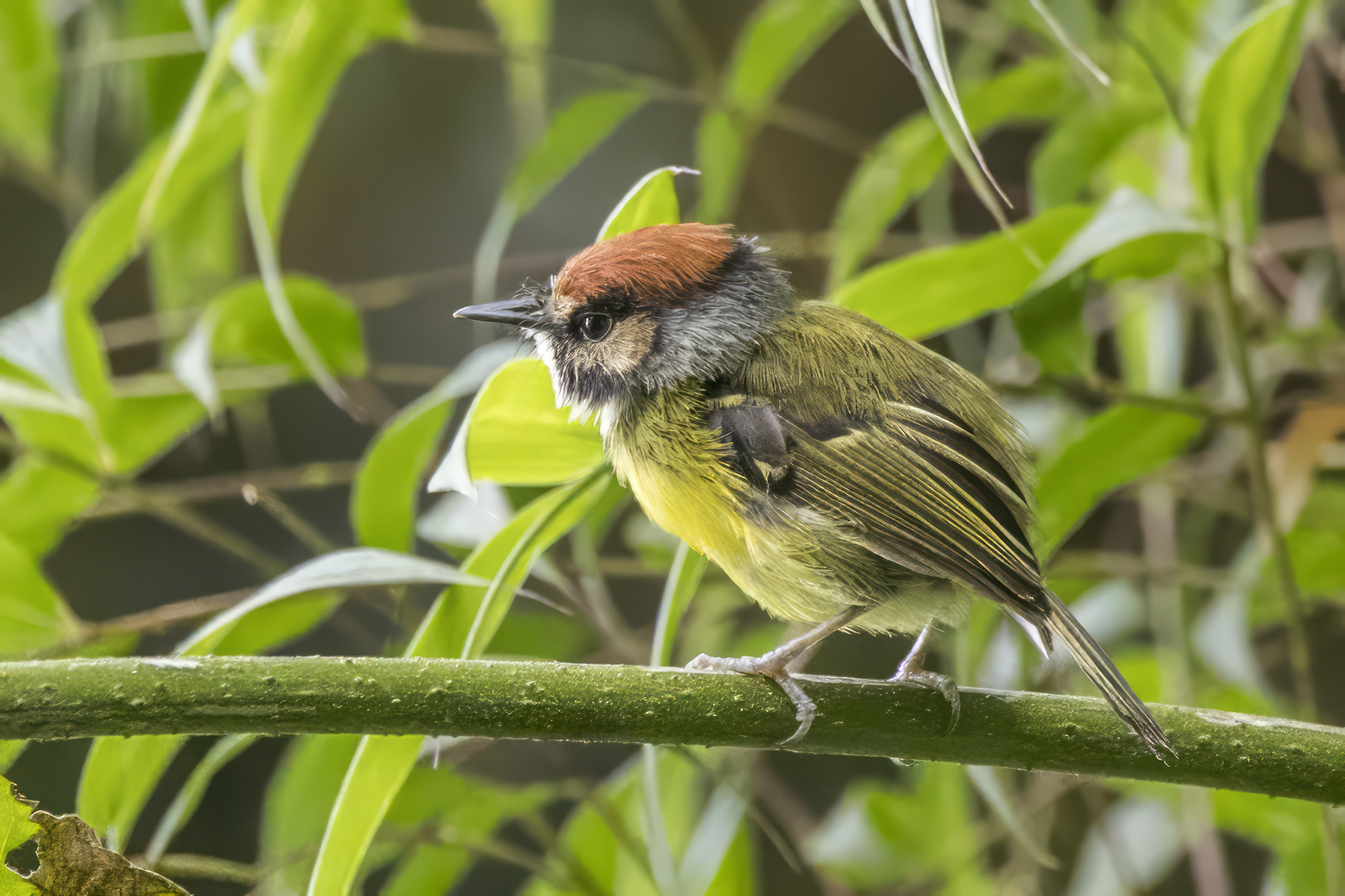
- Rufous-crowned tody-flycatcher (P. ruficeps nelanomystax)

Scientific classification
- Kingdom: Animalia
- Phylum: Chordata
- Class: Aves
- Order: Passeriformes
- Family: Tyrannidae
- Genus: Poecilotriccus; Berlepsch, 1884

Type species
- Todirostrum lenzi = Todirhamphus ruficeps von Berlepsch, 1884

Species
- 12, see text

= Poecilotriccus =

Genus of birds

Poecilotriccus is a genus of small flycatchers in the family Tyrannidae. Except for the recently described Johnson's tody-flycatcher, all have, at one point or another, been included in the genus Todirostrum. Some species have been known as tody-tyrants instead of tody-flycatchers. Most species are found in South America, but a single species, the slate-headed tody-flycatcher, is also found in Central America. The black-chested tyrant may also belong in this genus, but most place it in the monotypic genus Taeniotriccus.

== Taxonomy ==
The genus Poecilotriccus was introduced in 1884 by the German ornithologist Hans von Berlepsch to accommodate a single new species, Poecilotriccus lenzi. This is now considered to be a junior synonym of Todirhamphus ruficeps Kaup, 1852, the rufous-crowned tody-flycatcher and is the type species. The genus name combines the Ancient Greek poikilos meaning "pied" or "spotted" with -ouros meaning "-tailed".

== Species ==
The genus contains 12 species:

Image	Common name	Scientific name	Distribution
	Rufous-crowned tody-flycatcher	Poecilotriccus ruficeps	Venezuela, Colombia, Ecuador and far northern Peru
	Lulu's tody-flycatcher	Poecilotriccus luluae	northern Peru
	White-cheeked tody-flycatcher	Poecilotriccus albifacies	south-eastern Peru
	Black-and-white tody-flycatcher	Poecilotriccus capitalis	southern Colombia, eastern Ecuador, eastern Peru, and south-western Brazil
	Buff-cheeked tody-flycatcher	Poecilotriccus senex	Brazil
	Ruddy tody-flycatcher	Poecilotriccus russatus	Brazil, Guyana, and Venezuela
	Ochre-faced tody-flycatcher	Poecilotriccus plumbeiceps	Argentina, Bolivia, Brazil, Paraguay, Peru, and Uruguay.
	Smoky-fronted tody-flycatcher	Poecilotriccus fumifrons	Brazil, French Guiana, and Suriname
	Rusty-fronted tody-flycatcher	Poecilotriccus latirostris	Bolivia, Brazil, Colombia, Ecuador, and Peru
	Slaty-headed tody-flycatcher	Poecilotriccus sylvia	Belize, Brazil, Colombia, Costa Rica, French Guiana, Guatemala, Guyana, Honduras, Mexico, Nicaragua, Panama, and Venezuela
	Golden-winged tody-flycatcher	Poecilotriccus calopterus	Colombia, Ecuador, and Peru
	Black-backed tody-flycatcher	Poecilotriccus pulchellus	Peru
