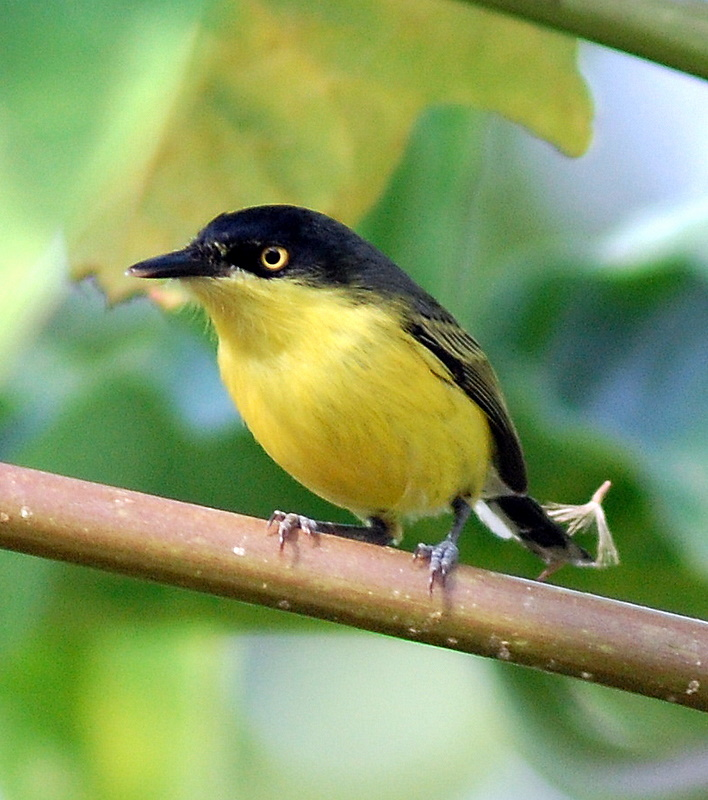
- Common tody-flycatcher (Todirostrum cinereum)

Scientific classification
- Kingdom: Animalia
- Phylum: Chordata
- Class: Aves
- Order: Passeriformes
- Family: Tyrannidae
- Genus: Todirostrum; Lesson, 1831

Type species
- Todus cinereus Linnaeus, 1766

Species
- see text

= Todirostrum =

Genus of birds

Todirostrum is a genus of Neotropical birds in the New World flycatcher family Tyrannidae.

== Taxonomy and species list ==
The genus Todirostrum was erected in 1831 by the French naturalist René Lesson. The type species was designated as the common tody-flycatcher by George Robert Gray in 1840. The name combines the genus Todus introduced by Mathurin Jacques Brisson in 1760 with the Latin rostrum meaning "bill".

It contains the following seven species:

Image	Name	Common name	Distribution
	Todirostrum maculatum	Spotted tody-flycatcher	Bolivia, Brazil, Colombia, Ecuador, French Guiana, Guyana, Peru, Suriname, Trinidad and Tobago, and Venezuela
	Todirostrum poliocephalum	Yellow-lored tody-flycatcher or grey-headed tody-flycatcher	Brazil, occurring from Southern Bahia southwards to Santa Catarina
	Todirostrum viridanum	Maracaibo tody-flycatcher	Venezuela
	Todirostrum nigriceps	Black-headed tody-flycatcher	Colombia, Costa Rica, Ecuador, Panama, and Venezuela
	Todirostrum pictum	Painted tody-flycatcher	eastern-southeastern Venezuela and the northeastern states of Brazil of the Amazon Basin
	Todirostrum cinereum	Common tody-flycatcher or black-fronted tody-flycatcher	southern Mexico to northwestern Peru, eastern Bolivia and southern Brazil.
	Todirostrum chrysocrotaphum	Yellow-browed tody-flycatcher	southern Amazon Basin of Brazil, also Amazonian Colombia, Ecuador, Peru, and Bolivia
