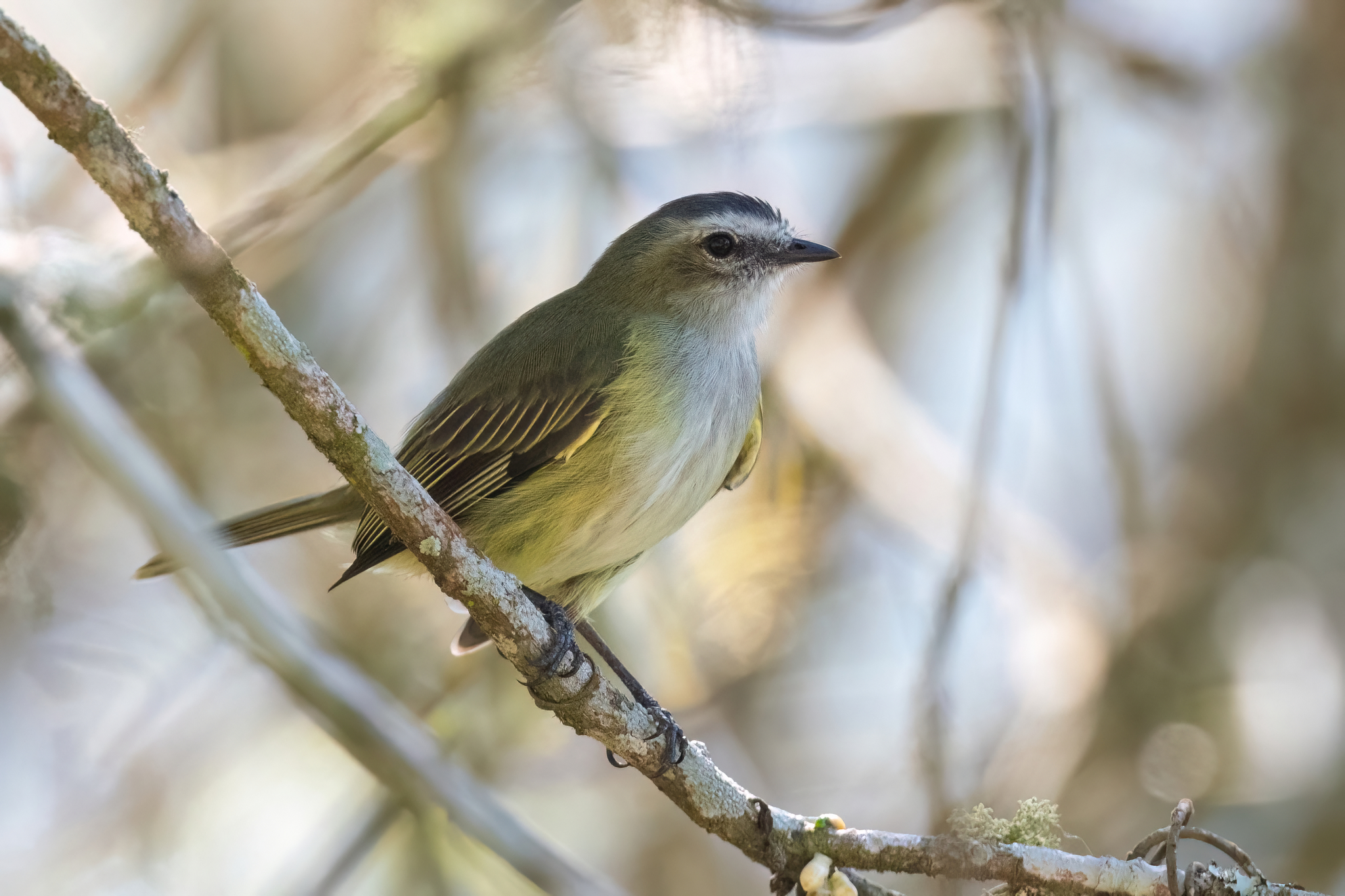

Conservation status
- Least Concern (IUCN 3.1)

Scientific classification
- Kingdom: Animalia
- Phylum: Chordata
- Class: Aves
- Order: Passeriformes
- Family: Tyrannidae
- Genus: Zimmerius
- Species: Z. vilissimus

Binomial name
- Zimmerius vilissimus (Sclater, PL & Salvin, 1859)

= Guatemalan tyrannulet =

Species of bird

The Guatemalan tyrannulet, or paltry tyrannulet, (Zimmerius vilissimus) is a very small passerine bird in the family Tyrannidae, the tyrant flycatchers. It is found in Belize, El Salvador, Guatemala, and Mexico.

== Taxonomy and systematics ==
The Guatemalan tyrannulet was originally described as Elainia vilissima. During much of the twentieth century it and several other tyrannulets were placed in genus Tyranniscus but a study published in 1977 erected the present genus Zimmerius for them.

Zimmerius vilissimus was previously called the paltry tyrannulet and included as subspecies what are now the mistletoe tyrannulet (Z. parvus), spectacled tyrannulet (Z. improbus), and Venezuelan tyrannulet (Z. petersi). Taxonomic systems began separating them in 2004 but it took until 2020 for all to complete the change. Most systems adopted the common name Guatemalan tyrannulet for Z. vilissimus sensu stricto to avoid confusion with the previous multi-subspecies paltry tyrannulet but as of late 2024 BirdLife International's Handbook of the Birds of the World retained the old "paltry" name.

The Guatemalan tyrannulet is monotypic.

== Description ==
The Guatemalan tyrannulet is 10 to 12 cm (3.9 to 4.7 in) long. The sexes have the same plumage. Adults have a grayish crown and a short whitish supercilium. Their upperparts are olive green. Their wings and tail are mostly olive green with yellow edges on the wing coverts, flight feathers, and tail feathers. Their underparts are mostly off-white with faint darker streaks on the breast and sometimes a pale yellow wash on the belly and undertail coverts. Both sexes have a light brown or brownish black iris, a short brownish black bill, and long brownish black legs and feet. Immature birds have dark irides and more green in their crown than adults.

== Distribution and habitat ==
The Guatemalan tyrannulet is found from the southern Mexican state of Chiapas east across Guatemala into southern Belize and south through Guatemala into El Salvador. It inhabits the interior and edges evergreen forest and also more open forest, plantations, and fields with scattered trees and shrubs. It favors areas with mistletoes (Loranthaceae). In elevation it ranges between 500 and 2,500 m (1,600 and 8,200 ft).

== Behavior ==
=== Movement ===
The Guatemalan tyrannulet is generally a year-round resident but at least some individuals move to lower elevations after breeding.

=== Feeding ===
The Guatemalan tyrannulet's diet has not been detailed but is known to include mistletoe berries, other fruits, and insects. It forages singly or in pairs, at all levels of the forest but mostly from the forest mid-story to the canopy. It takes food by gleaning while perched and with short sallies.

=== Breeding ===
The Guatemalan tyrannulet's breeding biology is not known in detail but is assumed to be similar to that of its former congener the mistletoe tyrannulet. That female of that species builds an oval nest with a side entrance from mosses and plant fibers bound with spider web and lined with seed down. It is typically placed about 2 to 15 m (5 to 50 ft) above the ground in a mass of moss or lichen hanging from a tree branch. Its clutch is two eggs and only the female incubates. The incubation period is 16 to 17 days and fledging occurs 18 to 20 days after hatch.

=== Vocalization ===
The Guatemalan tyrannulet's call is "a clear, slightly ringing to plaintive peeu or pyeu". It is assumed to have a dawn song like that of the mistletoe tyrannulet's, which is "a series of notes, the first a slow, dropping syllable and the rest short and rising...yer-de-dee, often followed by a trill".

== Status ==
The IUCN has assessed the Guatemalan tyrannulet as being of Least Concern. It has a large range; its population size is not known and is believed to be decreasing. No immediate threats have been identified. It is "common in a wide variety of habitats, including highly modified habitats around farms and towns, and is expected to be stable in human-modified areas".
