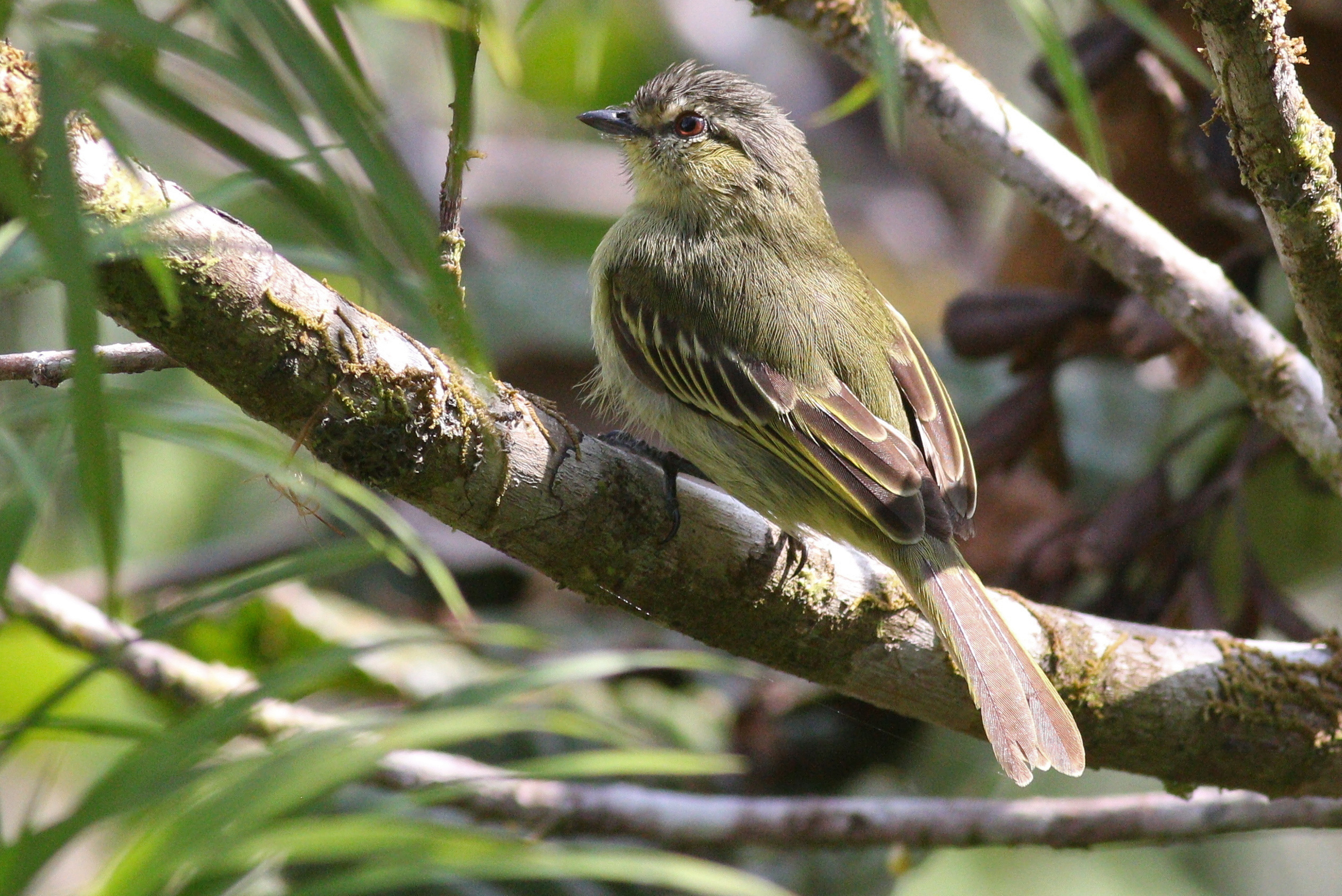

Scientific classification
- Kingdom: Animalia
- Phylum: Chordata
- Class: Aves
- Order: Passeriformes
- Family: Tyrannidae
- Genus: Zimmerius
- Species: Z. viridiflavus

Binomial name
- Zimmerius viridiflavus (Tschudi, 1844)
- Range

= Peruvian tyrannulet =

Species of bird

The Peruvian tyrannulet (Zimmerius viridiflavus) is a species of bird in the family Tyrannidae, the tyrant flycatchers. It is found in southwestern Ecuador and Peru.

== Taxonomy ==
The Peruvian tyrannulet was formally described in 1844 as Elaenia viridiflava by the Swiss naturalist Johann Jakob von Tschudi. The specific epithet combines the Latin viridis meaning "green" with flavus meaning "yellow". Tschudi gave the locality as Peru, but this has been restricted to the Río Tulumayo in the Department of Junín. The Peruvian tyrannulet is now one of 13 species placed in the genus Zimmerius that was introduced in 1977 by the American ornithologist Melvin Alvah Traylor Jr..

Two subspecies are recognised:

- Z. v. flavidifrons (Sclater, PL, 1860) – southwestern Ecuador (southeastern Guayas to western Loja Province and El Oro) to far northern Peru
- Z. v. viridiflavus (Tschudi, JJ, 1844) – east slope of Andes of Peru (Huánuco to Junín)

The subspecies Z. v. flavidifrons was formerly considered as a subspecies of the golden-faced tyrannulet (Zimmerius chrysops), but based on analyses of genetic, morphological and vocal differences by Frank Rheindt and collaborators, flavidifrons was moved to be a subspecies of the Peruvian tyrannulet. The subspecies Z. v. flavidifrons has also been treated as a separate species, the Loja tyrannulet.

== Description ==
The Peruvian tyrannulet is about 11 to 12 cm (4.3 to 4.7 in) long and weighs 9 to 10 g (0.32 to 0.35 oz). The sexes have the same plumage. Adults have pale yellow lores and eye-ring and a dark stripe through the eye on an otherwise buff-washed bright olive face. Their crown is darkish olive to grayish olive and their back and rump are bright olive. Their wings are dark dusky with bright yellow-green edges on the coverts and flight feathers. Their tail is dusky olive. Their throat is pale yellow, their breast and flanks olive-yellow with some olive markings, and their belly bright yellow. They have a gray to medium brown iris with a tan rim, a small, rounded, bill whose maxilla is gray to blackish and mandible medium gray, and dark gray to black legs and feet.

== Distribution and habitat ==
The Peruvian tyrannulet is found intermittently on the east side of the central Peruvian Andes in the departments of Huánuco, Junín, and Ayacucho. It primarily inhabits the canopy and edges of humid montane forest and occasionally occurs in secondary forest. In elevation it ranges between 1,000 and 2,500 m (3,300 and 8,200 ft).

== Behavior ==
=== Movement ===
The Peruvian tyrannulet is a year-round resident throughout its range.

=== Feeding ===
The Peruvian tyrannulet feeds on insects; it probably also feeds on small fruits like those of mistletoes (Loranthaceae). It forages singly or in pairs and often joins mixed-species feeding flocks. It feeds mostly in the forest canopy, perching horizontally with its tail cocked and actively moving about and gleaning food while perched or with short flights.

=== Breeding ===
Nothing is known about the Peruvian tyrannulet's breeding biology.

=== Vocalization ===
The Peruvian tyrannulet's dawn song is "a rising, musical, chiming series tew-tew-tee" and its call "a 1-4 note upslurred hooooeet? or huhu-hu eeet?".

== Status ==
The IUCN follows HBW taxonomy so its assessment of the Peruvian tyrannulet includes the Loja tyrannulet. The Peruvian tyrannulet occurs in at least one protected area in Huánuco.
