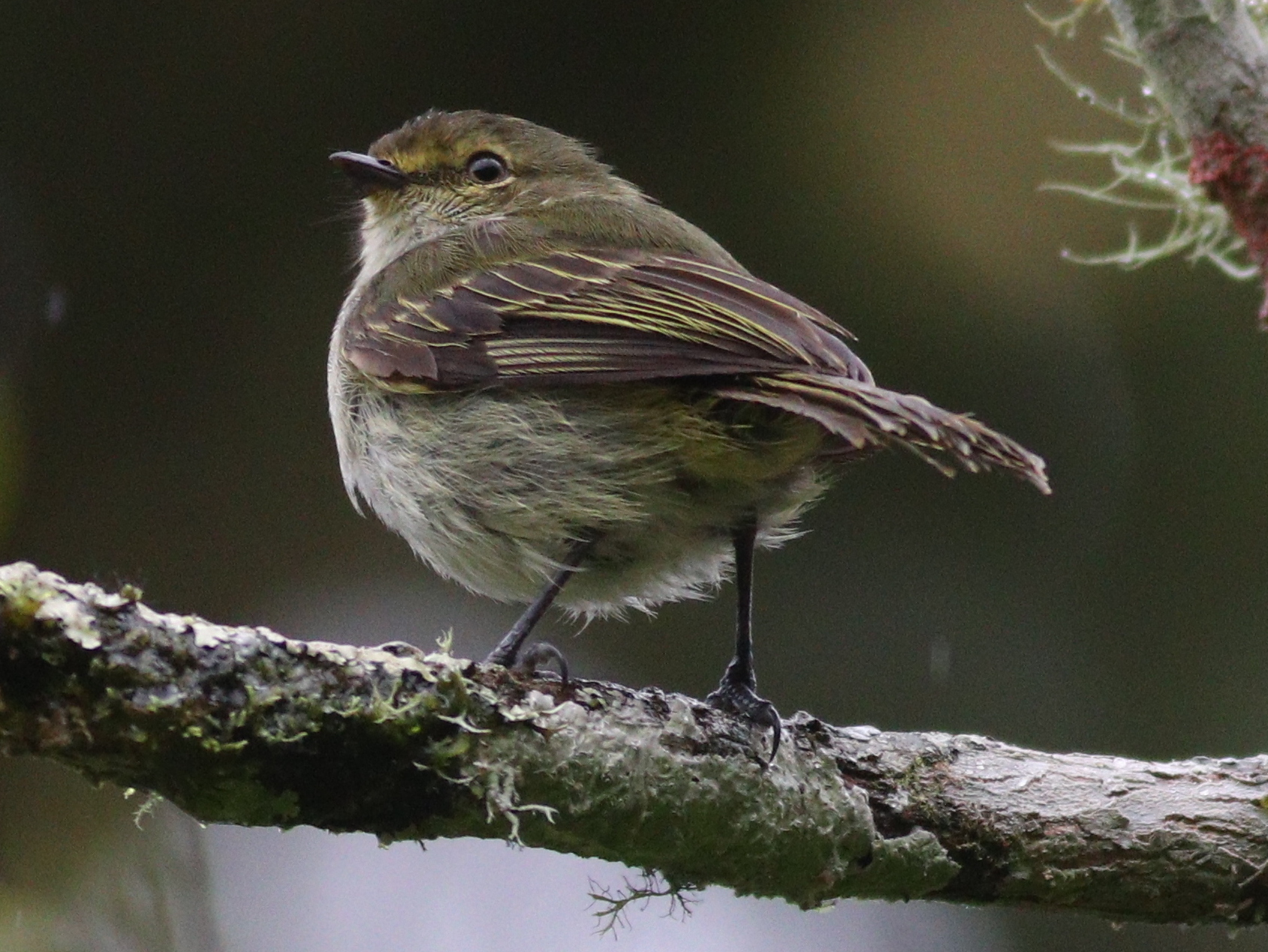

Conservation status
- Least Concern (IUCN 3.1)

Scientific classification
- Kingdom: Animalia
- Phylum: Chordata
- Class: Aves
- Order: Passeriformes
- Family: Tyrannidae
- Genus: Zimmerius
- Species: Z. albigularis

Binomial name
- Zimmerius albigularis (Chapman, 1924)

Synonyms
- Zimmerius chrysops albigularis

= Choco tyrannulet =

Species of bird

The Choco tyrannulet (Zimmerius albigularis) is a species of bird in the family Tyrannidae, the tyrant flycatchers. It is found in Colombia and Ecuador.

== Taxonomy and systematics ==
The Choco tyrannulet was originally described as Tyrannulus chrysops albibularis, a subspecies of the golden-faced tyrannulet. Through much of the twentieth century the golden-faced tyrannulet and several other tyrannulets were kept in genus Tyranniscus but a study published in 1977 erected the present genus Zimmerius for them. Following a study published in 2008 that detailed molecular and vocal differences among the golden-faced tyrannulet's subspecies, the Choco tyrannulet was recognized as a full species.

The Choco tyrannulet is monotypic.

== Description ==
The Choco tyrannulet is 10.5 to 11.5 cm (4.1 to 4.5 in) long and weighs 6.6 to 8.6 g (0.23 to 0.30 oz). The sexes have the same plumage. Adults have a mottled yellow forehead, dusky lores, a yellow supercilium, a dark stripe through the eye, and golden-brown ear coverts. Their crown, back, and rump are dark olive. Their wings are dusky with yellow edges on the coverts and flight feathers. Their tail is dusky. Their throat is whitish, their breast pale gray with a pale yellow tinge on the sides, their belly whitish, and their vent area pale yellow. They have a gray or brown iris, a small, rounded, black bill, and gray or black legs and feet.

== Distribution and habitat ==
The Choco tyrannulet is a bird of the Chocó bioregion. It is found from southwestern Colombia's Cauca Department south on the western side of the Andes through Ecuador to Santa Elena and Guayas provinces. It inhabits the interior and edges of humid lower montane forest, mature secondary woodland, coffee plantations, and gardens. In elevation it ranges from near sea level to 1,500 m (4,900 ft) in Colombia and to 1,600 m (5,200 ft) in Ecuador.

== Behavior ==
=== Movement ===
The Choco tyrannulet is believed to be a year-round resident throughout its range.

=== Feeding ===
The Choco tyrannulet feeds on insects and small fruits, especially those of mistletoes (Loranthaceae). It forages singly or in pairs and sometimes joins mixed-species feeding flocks. It feeds mostly in the forest canopy, perching horizontally with its tail cocked and actively moving about and gleaning food while perched or with short flights.

=== Breeding ===
Nothing is known about the Choco tyrannulet's breeding biology.

=== Vocalization ===
The Choco tyrannulet's dawn song is a "querulous, ascending 'treeu, tree-ree-ree-ree?' " and its call is "a simple 'cheli'...repeated over and over".

== Status ==
The IUCN has assessed the Choco tyrannulet as being of Least Concern. It has a large range; its population size is not known and is believed to be decreasing. No immediate threats have been identified. It is considered locally common in Colombia and "widespread and often common" in Ecuador. It occurs in several protected areas in Ecuador.
