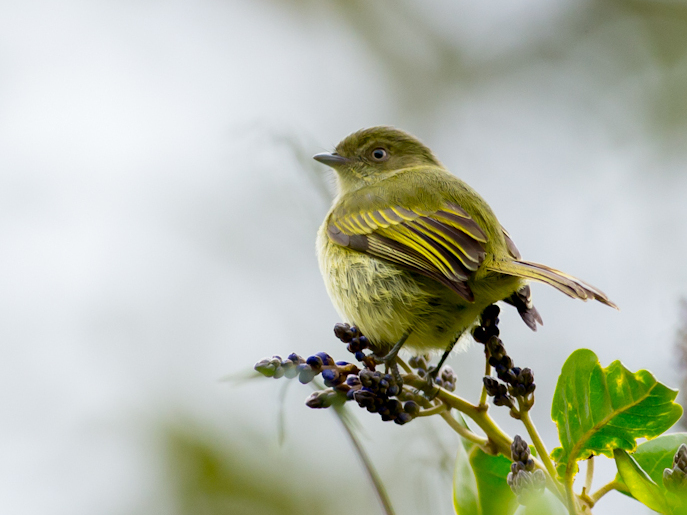

Conservation status
- Least Concern (IUCN 3.1)

Scientific classification
- Kingdom: Animalia
- Phylum: Chordata
- Class: Aves
- Order: Passeriformes
- Family: Tyrannidae
- Genus: Zimmerius
- Species: Z. bolivianus

Binomial name
- Zimmerius bolivianus (D'Orbigny, 1840)

= Bolivian tyrannulet =

Species of bird

The Bolivian tyrannulet (Zimmerius bolivianus) is a species of bird in the family Tyrannidae, the tyrant flycatchers. It is found in Bolivia and Peru.

== Taxonomy and systematics ==
During much of the twentieth century the Bolivian tyrannulet and several other tyrannulets were placed in genus Tyranniscus but a study published in 1977 erected the present genus Zimmerius for them.

The Bolivian tyrannulet is monotypic.

== Description ==
The Bolivian tyrannulet is 10 to 12 cm (3.9 to 4.7 in) long and weighs 10 to 11.6 g (0.35 to 0.41 oz). The sexes have the same plumage; females are slightly smaller than males. Adults have a dark olive crown, face, and upperparts. Their wings are mostly dark dusky; the coverts and flight feathers have thin bright yellow-green edges. Their tail is dusky olive. Their throat is whitish, their breast grayish olive to yellowish olive, and their belly and undertail coverts pale yellow. Adults have a creamy white iris, a small rounded black bill whose mandible can be deep reddish, purple, or gray, and black legs and feet. Juveniles are like adults except for a reddish to reddish brown iris.

== Distribution and habitat ==
The Bolivian tyrannulet is found on the east slope of the Andes from far eastern Junín and northern Ayacucho departments in south-central Peru southeast into Bolivia to Cochabamba Department. It inhabits humid montane forest and cloudforest, clearings within the forest, and nearby secondary forest. In elevation it ranges between 1,000 and 2,600 m (3,300 and 8,500 ft) in Peru and reaches 2,830 m (9,300 ft) in Bolivia.

== Behavior ==
=== Movement ===
The Bolivian tyrannulet is a year-round resident.

=== Feeding ===
The Bolivian tyrannulet feeds on insects and small fruits, especially those of mistletoes (Loranthaceae). It forages singly or in pairs and sometimes joins mixed-species feeding flocks. It feeds mostly in the forest canopy, actively moving about and gleaning food while perched or while briefly hovering after a short flight.

=== Breeding ===
Nothing is known about the Bolivian tyrannulet's breeding biology.

=== Vocalization ===
The Bolivian tyrannulet's dawn song is "a rising, plaintive series of whistles: hee-hee-heEEew" and its call "a mellow descending teew".

== Status ==
The IUCN has assessed the Bolivian tyrannulet as being of Least Concern. It has a large range; its population size is not known and is believed to be decreasing. No immediate threats have been identified. It is considered fairly common in Peru. It occurs in protected areas in both countries.
