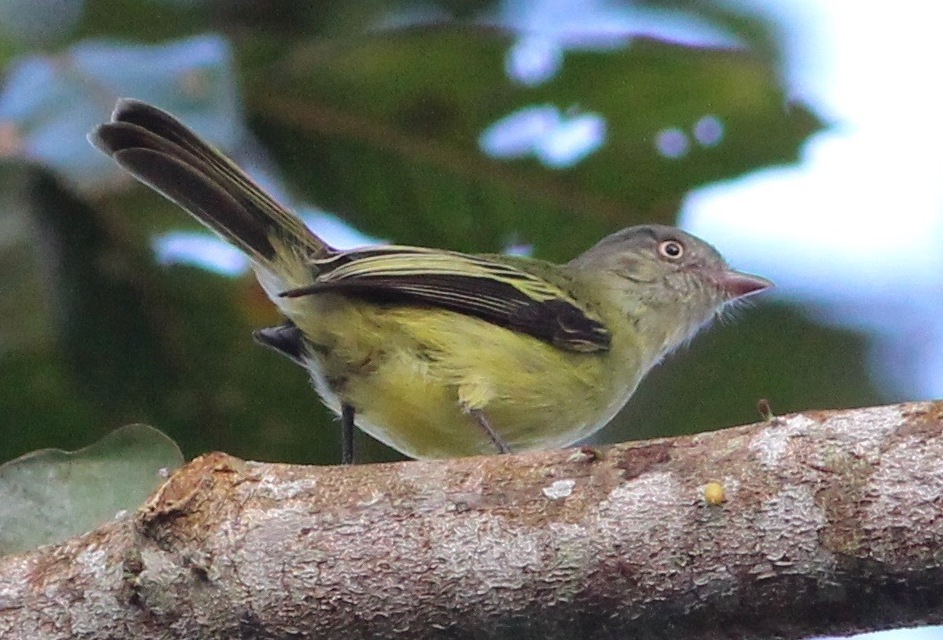
- Z. cinereicapilla in Bellavista Province, Peru

Conservation status
- Least Concern (IUCN 3.1)

Scientific classification
- Kingdom: Animalia
- Phylum: Chordata
- Class: Aves
- Order: Passeriformes
- Family: Tyrannidae
- Genus: Zimmerius
- Species: Z. cinereicapilla

Binomial name
- Zimmerius cinereicapilla (Cabanis, 1873)

= Red-billed tyrannulet =

Species of bird

The red-billed tyrannulet (Zimmerius cinereicapilla) is a species of bird in the family Tyrannidae, the tyrant flycatchers. It is found in Bolivia, Ecuador, and Peru.

== Taxonomy and systematics ==
The red-billed tyrannulet was originally described as Phyllomyias cinereicapilla. During much of the twentieth century the red-billed tyrannulet and several other tyrannulets were placed in genus Tyranniscus but a study published in 1977 erected the present genus Zimmerius for them. Early in the twentieth century some taxonomists treated it as a subspecies of the slender-footed tyrannulet (Z. gracilipes) but it has been widely accepted as a species since the 1990s. The two are now known to not be closely related, and the red-billed and Mishana tyrannulet (Z. vaillarejoi) appear to be sister species.

The red-billed tyrannulet is monotypic.

== Description ==
The red-billed tyrannulet is 11.5 to 12 cm (4.5 to 4.7 in) long; four males weighed 11.3 to 13.8 g (0.40 to 0.49 oz) and two females 10.7 and 11.2 g (0.38 and 0.40 oz). The sexes have the same plumage. Adults have a pale gray or dusky olive crown. Their face, back, and rump are olive green. Their wing's lesser coverts are dusky with olive green tips and the median and greater coverts are dusky with pale greenish white edges. Their flight feathers are blackish with pale greenish white or white edges. Their tail is dusky with thin pale olive edges on the feathers. Their throat is whitish, their breast light olive gray suffused with pale yellow, and their belly and undertail coverts pale yellow. Their upper belly and flanks have a few olive streaks. Adults have a pale straw yellow, cream, or creamy white iris, a dark gray, blackish, or brownish black maxilla, a pale purplish gray or dull pink mandible, and dark purple gray or dark gray legs and feet.

== Distribution and habitat ==
The red-billed tyrannulet has a disjunct distribution. It is found on the east slope of the Andes in north-central Ecuador's Napo Province and southern Ecuador's Zamora-Chinchipe Province. Its main range is on the east slope of the Andes of Peru at least between central Amazonas and Madre de Dios departments and possible further north to Ecuador and south to near Bolivia. It is known from a few locations in Bolivia's La Paz Department. The red-billed tyrannulet inhabits the canopy and edges of tropical forest in the Andean foothills and up into lower humid subtropical montane forest. In elevation it ranges between 900 and 1,350 m (3,000 and 4,400 ft) in Ecuador and 550 and 1,300 m (1,800 and 4,300 ft) in Peru.

== Behavior ==
=== Movement ===
The red-billed tyrannulet is a year-round resident.

=== Feeding ===
The red-billed tyrannulet's diet has not been detailed but is known to include insects and small fruits, especially those of mistletoes (Loranthaceae). It forages singly or in pairs and sometimes joins mixed-species feeding flocks. It feeds mostly in the forest canopy, actively moving about and gleaning food while perched or while briefly hovering after a short flight.

=== Breeding ===
Nothing is known about the red-billed tyrannulet's breeding biology.

=== Vocalization ===
The red-billed tyrannulet's song has been described as "an accelerating and slightly descending series of clear notes, teeuw tew-tew-te-te-te-te-te-te-te or...a fast series of clear notes, the last two emphasized, tirtetetetete-whét-whét". Other authors describe it as "a rising chi-wheet, interspersed with a rich, chuckling pi'CHEE'CHEE'CHEE'CHEE". Its call is "a rich pi'chew or pi'chew-chew-chew".

== Status ==
The IUCN originally in 2004 assessed the red-billed tyrannulet as being of Least Concern, in 2012 as Vulnerable, and since November 2023 again as of Least Concern. It has a large range; its population size is not known and is believed to be decreasing. "The primary threat to this species stems from deforestation, with parts of its range under pressure from logging, mining, agriculture and road building." It is considered "apparently rare and local (overlooked?)" in Ecuador and "uncommon (but often overlooked?)" in Peru. It does occur in a few protected areas.
