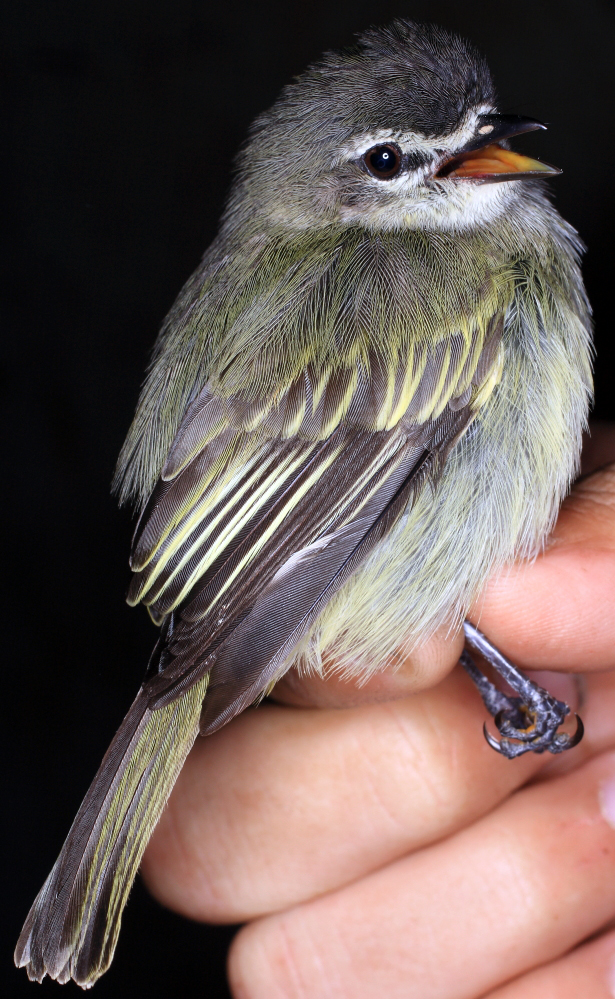

Conservation status
- Least Concern (IUCN 3.1)

Scientific classification
- Kingdom: Animalia
- Phylum: Chordata
- Class: Aves
- Order: Passeriformes
- Family: Tyrannidae
- Genus: Zimmerius
- Species: Z. improbus

Binomial name
- Zimmerius improbus (Sclater, PL & Salvin, 1871)

Synonyms
- Tyranniscus improbus; Zimmerius vilissimus improbus; Zimmerius vilissimus tamae

= Spectacled tyrannulet =

Species of bird

The spectacled tyrannulet (Zimmerius improbus), also known as the specious tyrannulet, mountain tyrannulet, and Venezuelan tyrannulet, is a small passerine bird in the family Tyrannidae, the tyrant flycatchers. It is found in Colombia and Venezuela.

== Taxonomy and systematics ==
The spectacled tyrannulet was originally described in 1871 by the English naturalists Philip Sclater and Osbert Salvin under the binomial name Tyranniscus improbus.

During much of the twentieth century the spectacled tyrannulet and several other tyrannulets were placed in genus Tyranniscus but a study published in 1977 erected the present genus Zimmerius for them. It was formerly treated as a subspecies of what was then the paltry tyrannulet (Zimmerius vilissimus sensu lato, now sensu stricto the Guatemalan tyrannulet). Taxonomic systems began recognizing them as separate species in 2004 but it took until 2020 to complete the change. Most systems eventually adopted the name "spectacled tyrannulet" for the species though for a time the International Ornithological Committee called it the "specious tyrannulet". BirdLife International's Handbook of the Birds of the World (HBW) for a time called it the "Venezuelan tyrannulet", a name now applied by all systems to Zimmerius petersi. As of late 2024 HBW called it the "mountain tyrannulet".

The spectacled tyrannulet has two subspecies, the nominate Z. i. improbus (Sclater, PL & Salvin, 1871) and Z. i. tamae (Phelps & Phelps Jr, 1954). Subspecies Z. i. tamae has separate populations that may represent as many as three species.

== Description ==
The spectacled tyrannulet is about 11.5 to 12.5 cm (4.5 to 4.9 in) long and weighs about 11 g (0.39 oz). The sexes have the same plumage. Adults of the nominate subspecies have a dark grayish green crown. They have a yellow-tinged white forehead, loral streak, and arcs above and below the eye that give it its common name. Their upperparts are green. Their wings are mostly dusky; the coverts and flight feathers have thin yellow edges. Their tail is rather long compared to those of other flycatchers; it is dark gray with yellow edges on the feathers. Their throat is whitish yellow and the rest of their underparts somewhat yellower. Subspecies Z. i. tamae has pure white lores and eye arcs. They have a darker and more dusky crown, a grayer breast, and paler yellow abdomen and undertail coverts than the nominate. Adults of both subspecies have a dark brown iris, a short, narrow black bill, and longish black legs and feet. Immature birds have duller and somewhat darker colors on their face and upperparts than adults, and their legs and feet are gray.

== Distribution and habitat ==
The spectacled tyrannulet has a disjunct distribution. The nominate subspecies has one population in northern Colombia's Norte de Santander Department and another in the Andes of northwestern Venezuela between Táchira and Trujillo states. Subspecies Z. i. tamae also has multiple populations. One is in the isolated Sierra Nevada de Santa Marta in northern Colombia, a second in the Serranía del Perijá on the Colombia-Venezuela border, and a third in the Páramo de Tamá in Táchira. The species inhabits the interior and edges of humid montane forest, more open forest and woodlands, and forest openings with scattered trees. In elevation it ranges from 1,500 to 2,400 m (4,900 to 7,900 ft) in Colombia, 1,800 to 3,000 m (5,900 to 9,800 ft) on the Venezuelan side of the Serranía del Perijá, and 800 to 3,000 m (2,600 to 9,800 ft) in the Venezuelan Andes.

== Behavior ==
=== Movement ===
All populations of the spectacled tyrannulet are year-round residents.

=== Feeding ===
The spectacled tyrannulet's diet has not been detailed but is known to include insects and fruits. Other species in genus Zimmerius rely heavily on mistletoe (Loranthaceae) fruits but it is not known how important they are to this species. It is an active forager, working singly or in pairs, at all levels of the forest but mostly from the forest mid-story to the canopy. It takes food by gleaning while perched and while briefly hovering after a short flight; it less frequently sallies to take insects in mid-air. It sometimes joins mixed-species feeding flocks.

=== Breeding ===
The spectacled tyrannulet's breeding season has not been detailed but appears to span as much as March to November in the Colombian part of the Serranía del Perijá. It makes an oval or dome-shaped nest with a side entrance, typically within a hanging clump of moss. The clutch size is two eggs. Nothing else is known about the species' breeding biology.

=== Vocalization ===
The spectacled tyrannulet is suspected to have vocal differences between the populations but details are lacking. In the Venezuelan Andes it makes "2-5 sad, halting, slightly descending whistles, each note fractionally lower than previous, wheeeeaa,. . . . wheeeeaa, .... etc., notes often hurried at [the] end". Pairs may sing a duet in which one bird gives a single "wheeeeeea" and the other answers with three or four of the same note. The species also makes "a buzzy szzzzz".

== Status ==
The IUCN has assessed the spectacled tyrannulet as being of Least Concern. It has a large range; its population size is not known and is believed to be stable. No immediate threats have been identified. It is considered fairly common in Colombia and common in Venezuela. It occurs "in a wide variety of habitats, including highly modified habitats around farms and towns, and is expected to be stable in human-modified areas".
