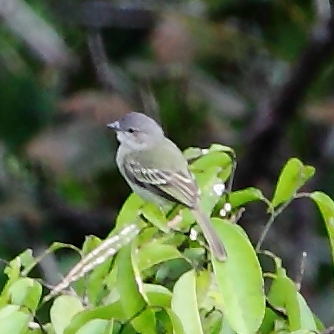
- At Manaus, Amazonas state, Brazil

Conservation status
- Least Concern (IUCN 3.1)

Scientific classification
- Kingdom: Animalia
- Phylum: Chordata
- Class: Aves
- Order: Passeriformes
- Family: Tyrannidae
- Genus: Zimmerius
- Species: Z. acer

Binomial name
- Zimmerius acer (Salvin & Godman, 1883)

Synonyms
- Tyranniscus acer (protonym); Zimmerius gracilipes acer

= Guianan tyrannulet =

Species of bird

The Guianan tyrannulet (Zimmerius acer) is a species of bird in the family Tyrannidae, the tyrant flycatchers. It is found in Brazil, French Guiana, Guyana, Suriname, and Venezuela.

== Taxonomy and systematics ==
The Guianan tyrannulet was originally described as Tyranniscus acer. Through much of the twentieth century it and several other tyrannulets were kept in genus Tyranniscus but a study published in 1977 erected the present genus Zimmerius for them. Also in much of the twentieth century the Guianan tyrannulet was treated as a subspecies of the slender-footed tyrannulet (then T. gracilipes, now Z. gracilipes) until a study published in 2008 returned it to full species status.

The Guianan tyrannulet is monotypic.

== Description ==
The Guianan tyrannulet is 9 to 12 cm (3.5 to 4.7 in) long and weighs 5.7 to 11 g (0.20 to 0.39 oz). The sexes have the same plumage. Adults have a gray forehead and crown. They have a thin whitish supercilium that starts at their lores and a dark stripe through the eye on an otherwise almost pure white face. Their back and rump are dull olive. Their wings are dusky with thin yellow edges on the coverts and inner parts of the flight feathers. Their tail is dusky olive. Their throat is almost pure white, their breast pale olive-yellow, and their belly and undertail coverts pale yellow. Adults have a gray or dark brown iris, a small, rounded, black bill, and dark grayish legs and feet.

== Distribution and habitat ==
The Guianan tyrannulet is found in eastern and southeastern Venezuela's Bolívar state and east across the Guianas and northern Brazil to the Atlantic in Ceará and south to northern Mato Grosso. There are also isolated populations in far eastern Brazil's Rio Grande do Norte to Alagoas states. It inhabits humid forest in the tropical zone, where it occupies both terra firme and várzea landscapes. In unbroken forest it typically is found in the canopy and at clearings and edges. It is occasionally found above 500 m (1,600 ft) in Brazil; it mostly occurs below 1,000 m (3,300 ft) in Venezuela but has been recorded up to 1,400 m (4,600 ft).

== Behavior ==
=== Movement ===
The Guianan tyrannulet is a year-round resident throughout its range.

=== Feeding ===
The Guianan tyrannulet feeds on insects and small fruits, especially those of mistletoes (Loranthaceae). It forages singly or in pairs and sometimes joins mixed-species feeding flocks. It feeds mostly in the forest canopy, actively moving about and gleaning food while perched or with short flight.

=== Breeding ===
The Guianan tyrannulet's breeding season includes September in Suriname but is otherwise unknown. Its nest is a ball or dome with a side entrance made from moss and plant fibers and lined with seed fluff and animal hair. The clutch is two eggs that are dull white with chestnut and lilac spots. The incubation period, time to fledging, and details of parental care are not known.

=== Vocalization ===
The Guianan tyrannulet's dawn song is described as "a fast series of cricket-like notes, 'tueet, tue're'RE!...tueet, tue're'RE!'. Another author described it as "a short, hard whistle, tuu, de'de, 1st note descending, last 2 higher" with two to four notes in a series that is repeated multiple times after short pauses. North of the Amazon its day call is "a double-noted 'chu-chup' (very sharply downslurred)" and south of the river it is "a single 'chup' ".

== Status ==
The IUCN has assessed the Guianan tyrannulet as being of Least Concern. It has a large range; its population size is not known and is believed to be decreasing. No immediate threats have been identified. It is considered uncommon to common "albeit often overlooked due to canopy-dwelling habits". It occurs in several protected areas and is "[f]requently found in forested areas within towns and cities across the species' range, even being common in small urban parks in heavily deforested NE Brazil".
