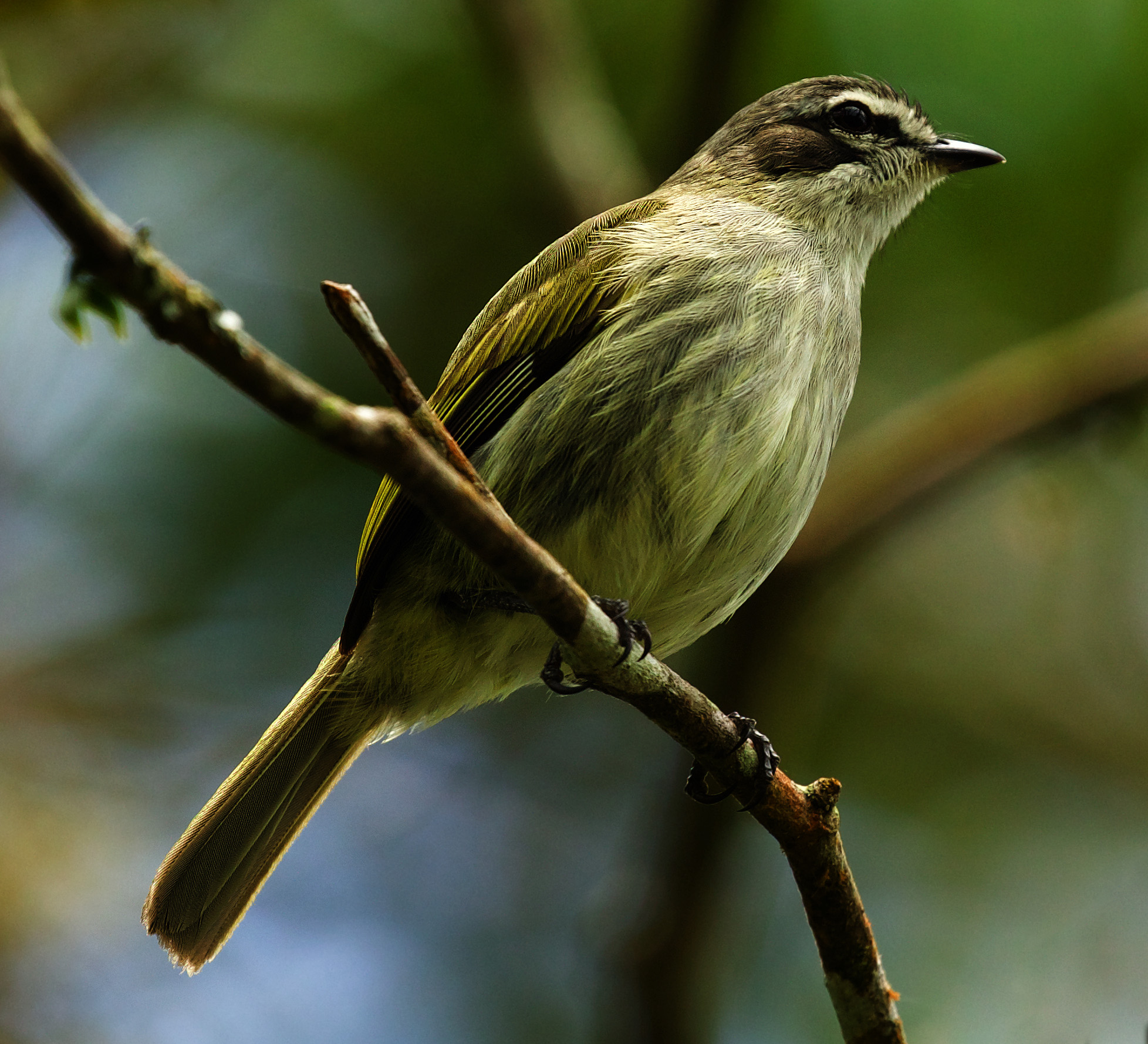

Conservation status
- Least Concern (IUCN 3.1)

Scientific classification
- Kingdom: Animalia
- Phylum: Chordata
- Class: Aves
- Order: Passeriformes
- Family: Tyrannidae
- Genus: Zimmerius
- Species: Z. petersi

Binomial name
- Zimmerius petersi (von Berlepsch, 1907)

Synonyms
- Tyranniscus petersi; Zimmerius vilissimus petersi; Zimmerius improbus petersi

= Venezuelan tyrannulet =

Species of bird

The Venezuelan tyrannulet (Zimmerius petersi) is a species of passerine bird in the family Tyrannidae, the tyrant flycatchers. It is endemic to Venezuela.

== Taxonomy and systematics ==
The Venezuelan tyrannulet was originally described as Tyranniscus petersi.

During much of the twentieth century the Venezuelan tyrannulet and several other tyrannulets were placed in genus Tyranniscus but a study published in 1977 erected the present genus Zimmerius for them. It was formerly treated as a subspecies of what was then the paltry tyrannulet (Zimmerius vilissimus sensu lato, now sensu stricto the Guatemalan tyrannulet), and then as a subspecies of the spectacled tyrannulet (Z. improbus) after that species was recognized as separate from the paltry tyrannulet. Following a molecular phylogenetic study published in 2013, taxonomic systems began recognizing the Venezuelan tyrannulet as separate species in 2016 but it took until 2020 to complete the change.

The Venezuelan tyrannulet is monotypic.

== Description ==
The Venezuelan tyrannulet is about 11.5 to 12.5 cm (4.5 to 4.9 in) long and weighs about 10 g (0.35 oz). The sexes have the same plumage. Adults have a dark slate gray crown. They have a white supercilium that starts at the base of the bill and continues past the eye, a wide white arc under the eye, and gray ear coverts with a black line above them. Their back and rump are olive green. Their wings are mostly dusky; most of the coverts and flight feathers have yellow edges. Their tail is dark gray with yellowish edges on the feathers. Their throat is white. The rest of their underparts are also mostly white, with faint darker streaks on the breast and a yellow wash on the flanks and belly. Adults have a dark brown iris, a black bill, and longish black or dark gray legs and feet. Immature birds have a more olivaceous crown and a duller white supercilium than adults; their flight feathers and tail are brown.

== Distribution and habitat ==
The Venezuelan tyrannulet is found in the Venezuelan Coastal Range between southern Lara and Miranda states. It inhabits the interior and edges of humid forest, more open forest and woodlands, and forest openings with scattered trees. In elevation it ranges from 400 to 2,000 m (1,300 to 6,600 ft).

== Behavior ==
=== Movement ===
The Venezuelan tyrannulet is a year-round resident.

=== Feeding ===
The Venezuelan tyrannulet's diet has not been detailed but is known to include insects and fruits. Other species in genus Zimmerius rely heavily on mistletoe (Loranthaceae) fruits but it is not known how important they are to this species. It is an active forager, working singly or in pairs, at all levels of the forest but mostly from the forest mid-story to the canopy. It takes food by gleaning while perched and while briefly hovering after a short flight; it less frequently sallies to take insects in mid-air. It sometimes joins mixed-species feeding flocks.

=== Breeding ===
Nothing is known about the Venezuelan tyrannulet's breeding biology.

=== Vocalization ===
During the day the Venezuelan tyrannulet makes "a relatively long, plaintive, slightly descending whistle". No other vocalizations have been described and there are few recordings available at xeno-canto and the Cornell Lab of Ornithology's Macaulay Library.

== Status ==
The IUCN has assessed the Venezuelan tyrannulet as being of Least Concern. It has a restricted range; its population size is not known and is believed to be stable. No immediate threats have been identified. "Venezuelan Tyrannulet is common in a wide variety of forested habitats, and is expected to be stable in human-modified areas."
