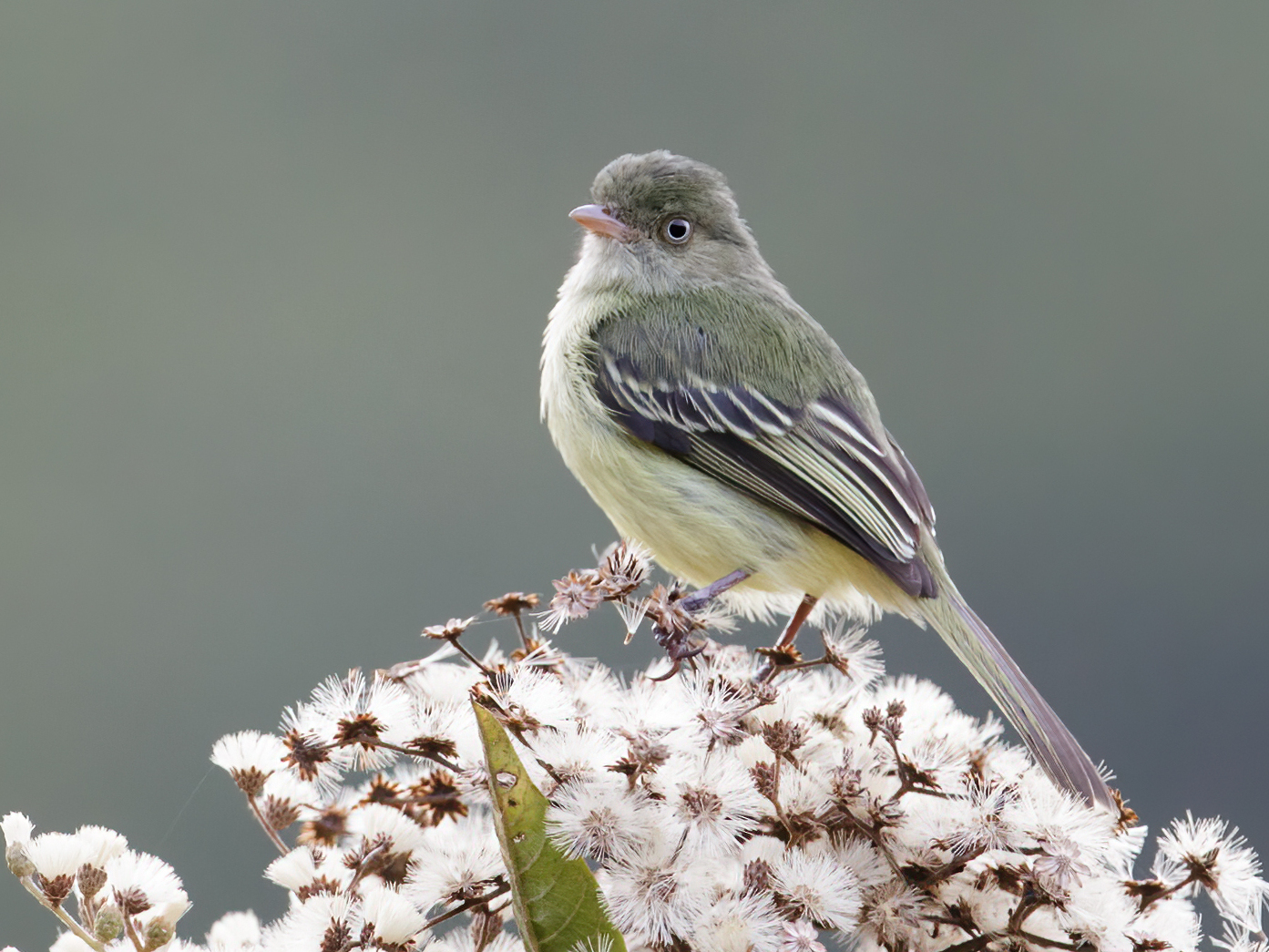

Conservation status
- Least Concern (IUCN 3.1)

Scientific classification
- Kingdom: Animalia
- Phylum: Chordata
- Class: Aves
- Order: Passeriformes
- Family: Tyrannidae
- Genus: Zimmerius
- Species: Z. villarejoi

Binomial name
- Zimmerius villarejoi Álvarez A, J & Whitney, 2001

= Mishana tyrannulet =

Species of bird

The Mishana tyrannulet (Zimmerius villarejoi) is a species of bird in the family Tyrannidae, the tyrant flycatchers. It is endemic to Peru.

== Taxonomy and systematics ==
The Mishana tyrannulet is monotypic. However, it inhabits two separate ranges and the two populations might represent individual species. It and the red-billed tyrannulet (X. cinereicapilla) appear to be sister species.

The Mishana tyrannulet's common name is from the Zona Reservada Allpahuayo-Mishana in the Department of San Martín, where the holotype was collected. Its specific epithet is "in honor of the Augustinian priest P. Avencio Villarejo (1910–2000)" who traveled the Peruvian Amazon in the 1930s and 1940s and described its flora, fauna, and the customs of its indigenous peoples.

== Description ==
The Mishana tyrannulet weighs about 6 to 7 g (0.21 to 0.25 oz). The sexes have the same plumage. Adults have an olive crown, back, and rump. Their face is slightly paler and more greenish. Their wings are dull blackish with a faint olive cast. The wing coverts have sulphur yellow edges and the secondaries and outer primaries have thinner yellow edges. Their tail is dusky with thin olive green edges on the feathers. Their throat is pale greenish olive, their breast olive yellow, and their belly and undertail coverts sulphur yellow. They have a pale creamy white iris, a pale brown to dull reddish maxilla, a dull pink mandible, and bluish black, gray, or dull reddish legs and feet.

== Distribution ==
The Mishana tyrannulet has two disjunct populations. One is in the basins of the Nanay and Tigre rivers near Iquitos in Loreto Department. The other is southwest of there in the basins of the Mayo and Huallaga rivers in San Martín Department. Targeted searches between the two have not found the species. Both populations primarily inhabit scrubby or low-stature forest on nutrient-poor white sand soils. The Loreto population also inhabits forest on weathered clay soil and some peatlands. The San Martín population also inhabits stunted forest, including secondary forest, on other nutrient-poor soil types.

== Behavior ==
=== Movement ===
The Mishana tyrannulet is a year-round resident.

=== Feeding ===
The Mishana tyrannulet's diet has not been detailed but is known to include arthropods, seeds, and small fruits including those of mistletoes (Loranthaceae). It forages singly or in pairs and seldom joins mixed-species feeding flocks. It feeds mostly in the forest subcanopy and canopy, actively moving about and gleaning food while perched and taking arthropods with brief sallies to leaves and twigs.

=== Breeding ===
Nothing is known about the Mishana tyrannulet's breeding biology.

=== Vocalization ===
The authors who formally described the Mishana tyrannulet noted three different vocalizations in the Loreto population. Its dawn song is "a simple series of two to four nearly evenly spaced notes at about 4 kHz (the final note is sometimes slightly higher), the first of which is longest, with successive notes becoming slightly shorter". During the day it commonly makes "a closely spaced pair...of thin, rising (about 4.5–5.5 kHz), whistled notes". It occasionally makes "a more complex, multisyllabic...descending series (about 4.5–3.5 kHz) in which both the notes and the internote intervals become successively shorter through the first half". The vocalizations of the San Martín population are similar "but begin with a much stronger initial downward component". Another vocalization there is "a slightly descending series of seven sharply descending lisping notes".

== Status ==
The IUCN initially in 2002 assessed the Mishana tyrannulet as Vulnerable and since October 2021 as being of Least Concern. Its estimated population of between 10,000 and 20,000 mature individuals is believed to be decreasing. "The limited extent of appropriate 'varillal' habitat, and the continuing extraction of trees for building materials and posts, means that much of the population is threatened by habitat loss. Outside protected areas, white-sand forests are being exploited for timber and other products...While forests within the distribution range in Loreto appear secure and not under imminent risk, habitat loss is much more severe in San Martín." The species occurs in three protected areas in Loreto, one of which was specifically created to protect white-sand forest.
