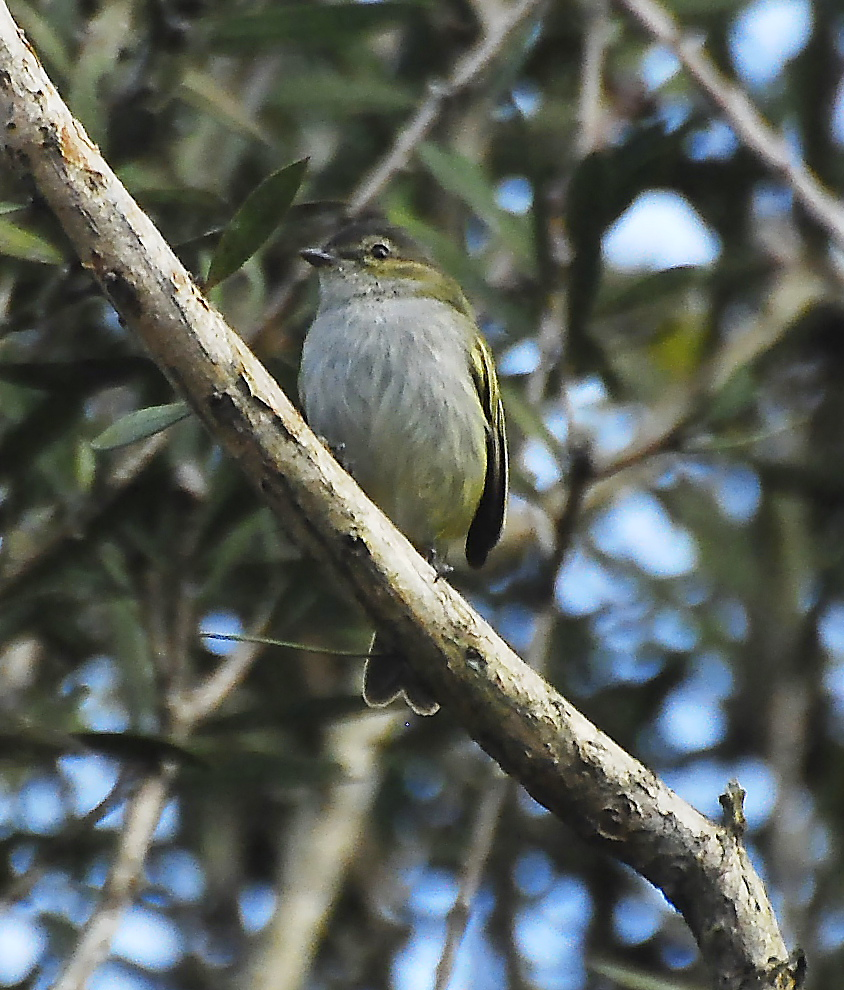
- Guatemalan tyrannulet (Zimmerius vilissimus)

Scientific classification
- Kingdom: Animalia
- Phylum: Chordata
- Class: Aves
- Order: Passeriformes
- Family: Tyrannidae
- Genus: Zimmerius; Traylor, 1977

Type species
- Tyrannulus chrysops Sclater, 1859

Species
- see text

= Zimmerius =

Genus of birds

Zimmerius is a genus of Neotropical birds in the family Tyrannidae.

== Taxonomy ==
The genus was erected by the American ornithologist Melvin Alvah Traylor Jr. in 1977 with the golden-faced tyrannulet (Zimmerius chrysops) as the type species. The name Zimmerius was chosen to honour the American ornithologist John Todd Zimmer (1889-1957) who specialised in the classification of Neotropical birds.

== Species ==
The genus contains 13 species:

Image	Scientific name	Common name	Distribution
	Red-billed tyrannulet	Zimmerius cinereicapilla	Bolivia, Ecuador, and Peru
	Mishana tyrannulet	Zimmerius villarejoi	northeastern Peru
	Chico's tyrannulet	Zimmerius chicomendesi	Brazil
	Guianan tyrannulet	Zimmerius acer	east Amazon Basin and northeastern Brazil
	Guatemalan tyrannulet	Zimmerius vilissimus	highlands of southern Mexico (Chiapas), Guatemala and western El Salvador
	Mistletoe tyrannulet	Zimmerius parvus	lowlands from eastern Guatemala, Belize, and Honduras southward to Panama and far northwestern Colombia (Chocó)
	Choco tyrannulet	Zimmerius albigularis	western Colombia and western Ecuador
	Spectacled tyrannulet	Zimmerius improbus	northeast Colombia and northwest Venezuela
	Golden-faced tyrannulet	Zimmerius chrysops	Colombia, Ecuador, Peru, and Venezuela.
	Peruvian tyrannulet	Zimmerius viridiflavus	southern Ecuador.
	Bolivian tyrannulet	Zimmerius bolivianus	Bolivia and Peru
	Venezuelan tyrannulet	Zimmerius petersi	Venezuela
	Slender-footed tyrannulet	Zimmerius gracilipes	Venezuela, Colombia, Ecuador, Peru, Bolivia and Brazil.
	Loja tyrannulet	Zimmerius flavidifrons	southwestern Ecuador.
