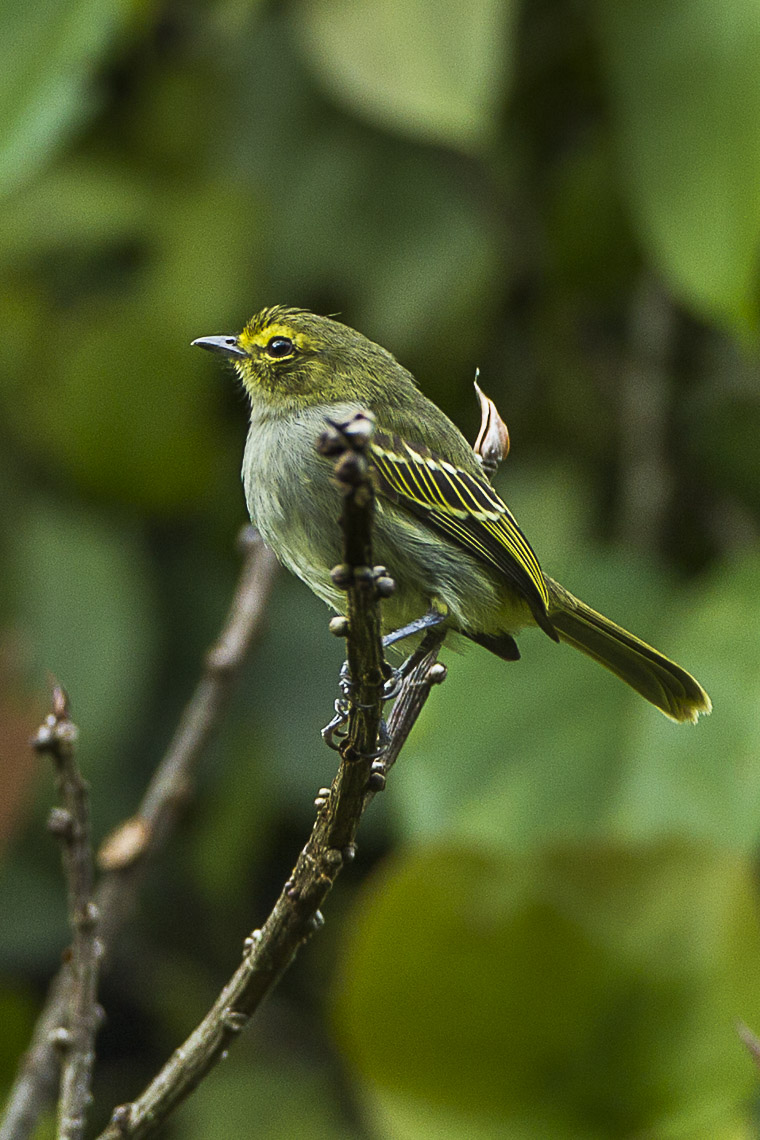

Conservation status
- Least Concern (IUCN 3.1)

Scientific classification
- Kingdom: Animalia
- Phylum: Chordata
- Class: Aves
- Order: Passeriformes
- Family: Tyrannidae
- Genus: Zimmerius
- Species: Z. chrysops

Binomial name
- Zimmerius chrysops (Sclater, PL, 1859)
- Range

= Golden-faced tyrannulet =

Species of bird

The golden-faced tyrannulet (Zimmerius chrysops) is a species of bird in the tyrant flycatcher family Tyrannidae. It is found in Colombia, Ecuador, Peru, and Venezuela.

== Taxonomy ==
The golden-faced tyrannulet was formally described in 1859 as Tyrannulus chrysops by the English zoologist Philip Sclater based on specimens collected by the zoologist Louis Fraser in Gualaquiza and Zamora of Ecuador. The specific epithet combines the Ancient Greek χρυσος/khrusos meaning "gold" with ωψ/ōps, ωπος/ōpos meaning "face". The type locality has been restricted to Zamora. The golden-faced tyrannulet is now one of 13 species placed in the genus Zimmerius that was introduced in 1977 by the American ornithologist Melvin Alvah Traylor Jr. with the golden-faced tyrannulet as the type species. The golden-faced tyrannulet was formerly considered to be conspecific with the Peruvian tyrannulet (Zimmerius viridiflavus).

Three subspecies are recognised:

- Z. c. chrysops (Sclater, PL, 1859) – Sierra de Perijá and Andes of northwestern Venezuela, Colombia (except Nariño), eastern Ecuador, and northern Peru (southward to San Martín)
- Z. c. minimus (Chapman, FM, 1912) – Santa Marta Mountains (northeastern Colombia)
- Z. c. cumanensis (Zimmer, JT, 1941) – coastal mountains of eastern Venezuela (Anzoátegui, Sucre, and Monagas)

The subspecies Z. c. minimus and Z. c. cumanensis have sometimes been treated as a separate species, Coopmans's tyrannulet.

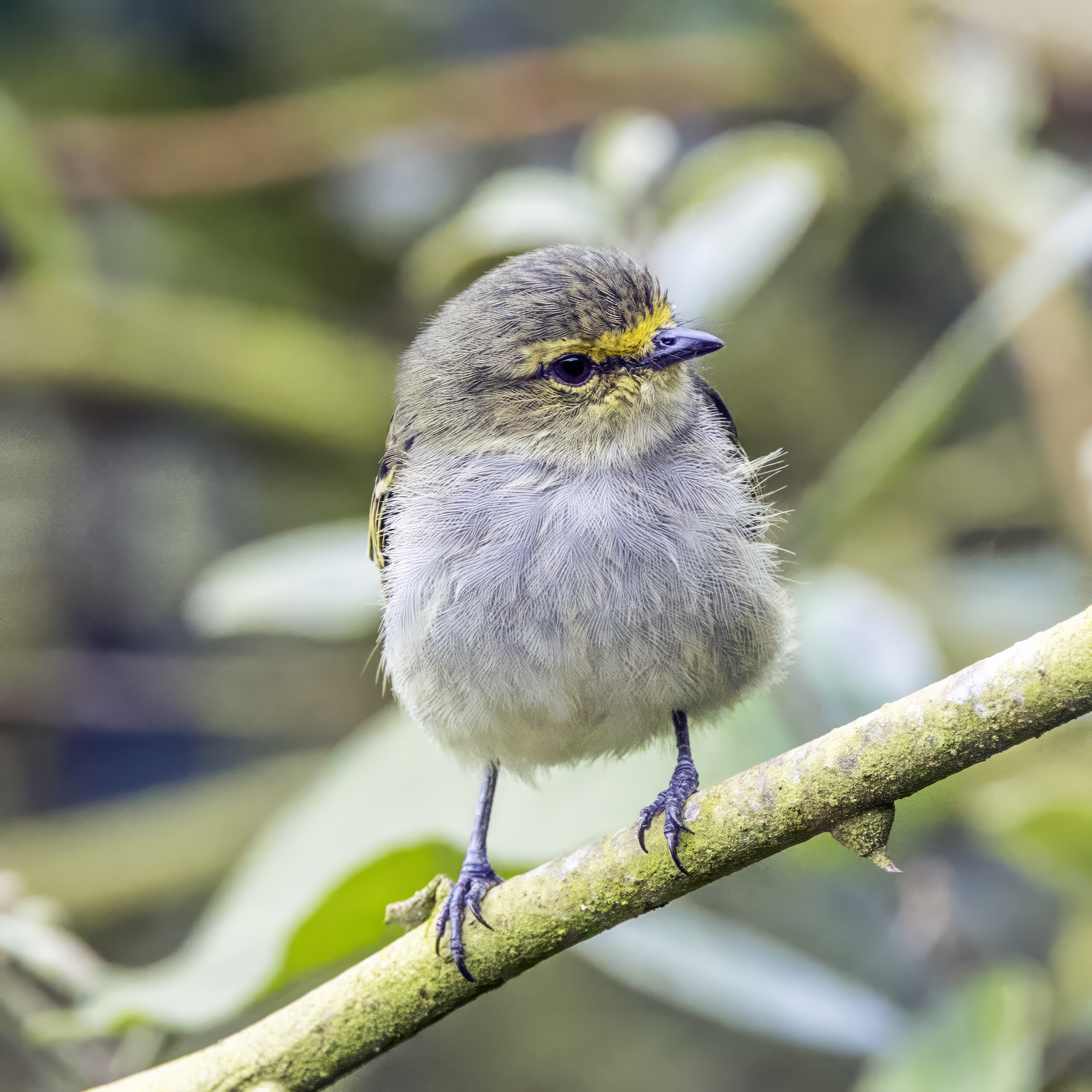
In Colombia

== Description ==
The golden-faced tyrannulet is 10.5 to 11.5 cm (4.1 to 4.5 in) long and weighs 7.7 to 10.6 g (0.27 to 0.37 oz). The sexes have the same plumage. Adults have a bright yellow forehead, supercilium and area around the eye and a dark stripe through the eye on an otherwise yellowish white face. Their crown, back, and rump are bright olive. Their wings are dusky with bright yellow edges on the coverts and flight feathers. Their tail is dusky. Their throat is yellowish white and their breast, flanks, and belly dull whitish. They have a brown or brownish gray iris, a small, rounded, blackish bill, and gray legs and feet.

== Distribution and habitat ==
The golden-faced tyrannulet is found in the Andes of northwestern Venezuela, the Serranía del Perijá on the Venezuela-Colombia border, in all three ranges of the Colombian Andes except in the southwesternmost Nariño Department, and on the eastern Andean slope for the full length of Ecuador and into Peru as far as the Department of San Martín. It inhabits the interior and edges of humid montane forest, secondary woodland, and semi-deciduous forest, and also coffee plantations and gardens. In elevation it ranges up to 2,400 m (7,900 ft) in Venezuela, to 2,300 m (7,500 ft) in Colombia, to 2,200 m (7,200 ft) in Ecuador, and occurs between 1,000 and 2,450 m (3,300 and 8,000 ft) in Peru.

== Behavior ==
=== Movement ===
The golden-faced tyrannulet is a year-round resident throughout its range.

=== Feeding ===
The golden-face tyrannulet feeds on insects and small fruits, especially those of mistletoes (Loranthaceae). It forages singly or in pairs. It generally spends about the same amount of foraging time as part of mixed-species feeding flocks as away from them, though it apparently seldom joins them in Colombia. It feeds mostly in the forest canopy, perching horizontally with its tail cocked and actively moving about and gleaning food while perched or with short flights.

=== Breeding ===
The golden-faced tyrannulet apparently has some breeding activity (nest-building, egg-laying and incubation, or provisioning nestlings) during most of the year. The female makes a dome-shaped nest with a side entrance, typically within hanging moss or a bunch of moss on a tree trunk. They usually are between about 5 and 12 m (15 and 40 ft) above the ground but one in eastern Ecuador was 45 m (150 ft) up. The clutch is two eggs that are cream-white with liver-brown spots. The female alone incubates, for about 17 days. Both parents feed the nestlings between hatch and fledging 17 to 19 days later.

=== Vocalization ===
The golden-faced tyrannulet is highly vocal. Its dawn song is a "plaintive chu-de-de'e'e". Another author describes it as "a slightly rising, accelerating, laughing series of notes: tee-heeheeheehee". Its daytime calls include "a simple clear 'cleeuw' or 'peeur' " and a "ringing 'teer-tif' ".

== Conservation status ==
The International Union for Conservation of Nature (IUCN) has assessed the golden-faced tyrannulet as being of Least Concern. The species is considered common in Venezuela and Colombia, "widespread and often common" in Ecuador, and "common and widespread" in Peru. It occurs in several protected areas.
