= Tana River cisticola =

Conservation status
- Data Deficient (IUCN 3.1)

Scientific classification
- Kingdom: Animalia
- Phylum: Chordata
- Class: Aves
- Order: Passeriformes
- Family: Cisticolidae
- Genus: Cisticola
- Species: C. restrictus

Binomial name
- Cisticola restrictus Traylor, 1967

Species of bird

The Tana River cisticola (Cisticola restrictus) is a species of bird in the family Cisticolidae. It is found in Kenya and there is speculation that it may also be found in Somalia.

Its natural habitat is subtropical or tropical moist shrubland.
