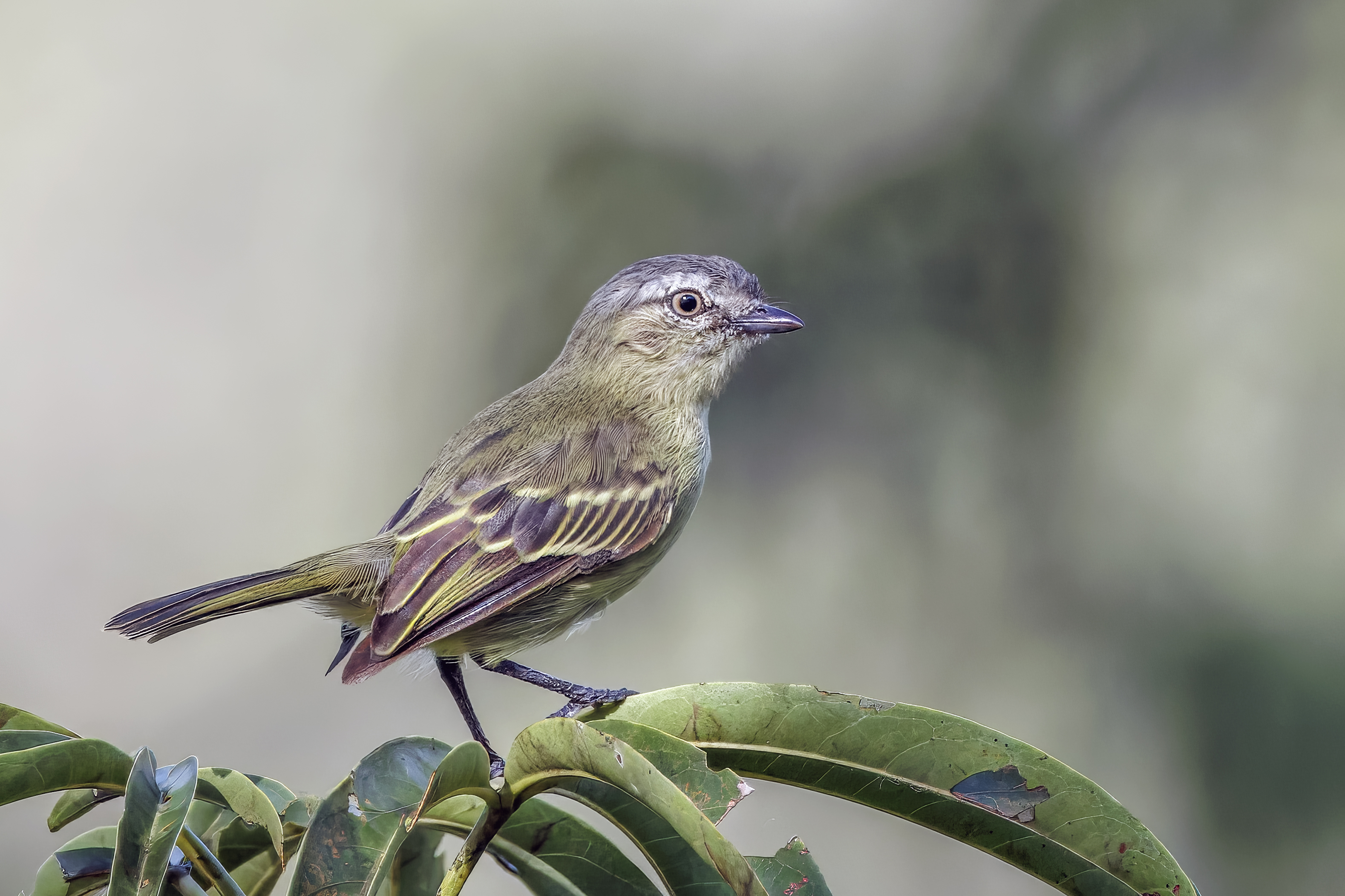
- Z. g. gracilipes, Ecuador

Conservation status
- Least Concern (IUCN 3.1)

Scientific classification
- Kingdom: Animalia
- Phylum: Chordata
- Class: Aves
- Order: Passeriformes
- Family: Tyrannidae
- Genus: Zimmerius
- Species: Z. gracilipes

Binomial name
- Zimmerius gracilipes (Sclater, PL & Salvin, 1868)

Synonyms
- Tyranniscus gracilipes

= Slender-footed tyrannulet =

Species of bird

The slender-footed tyrannulet (Zimmerius gracilipes) is a species of bird in the family Tyrannidae, the tyrant flycatchers. It is found in Bolivia, Brazil, Colombia, Ecuador, Peru, and Venezuela.

== Taxonomy and systematics ==
The slender-footed tyrannulet was originally described as Tyranniscus gracilipes. Through much of the twentieth century it and several other tyrannulets were kept in genus Tyranniscus but a study published in 1977 erected the present genus Zimmerius for them.

The slender-footed tyrannulet has two subspecies, the nominate Z. g. gracilipes (Sclater, PL & Salvin, 1868) and Z. g. gilvus (Zimmer, JT, 1941). What are now the red-billed tyrannulet (Z. cinereicapilla) and the Guianan tyrannulet (Z. acer) were previously treated as additional subspecies.

== Description ==
The slender-footed tyrannulet is 9 to 12 cm (3.5 to 4.7 in) long and weighs 6.6 to 9.5 g (0.23 to 0.34 oz). The sexes have the same plumage. Adults of the nominate subspecies have a gray forehead and crown. They have a thin whitish supercilium that starts at their lores and a dark stripe through the eye on an otherwise yellowish white face. Their back and rump are dull olive. Their wings are dusky with thin yellow edges on the coverts and inner parts of the flight feathers. Their tail is dusky olive. Their throat is yellowish white, their breast dull olive-yellow, and their belly and undertail coverts yellow. Subspecies Z. g. gilvus has brighter yellow underparts than the nominate. Adults of both subspecies have a grayish iris, a small, rounded, black bill, and dark grayish legs and feet.

== Distribution and habitat ==
The slender-footed tyrannulet is a bird of the upper Amazon Basin. The nominate subspecies is found in southeastern Venezuela's Bolívar and Amazonas states, extreme eastern Colombia between Vichada and Amazonas departments, and south through Amazonas state in northwestern Brazil and northeastern Ecuador into northeastern Peru's Department of Loreto. Subspecies Z. g. gilvus is found in western and southern Brazil from Amazonas east to the Negro and Tapajós rivers and south to Rondônia and northern Mato Grosso states, through the length of central and southeastern Peru, and in northern Bolivia.

The slender-footed tyrannulet inhabits humid forest in the tropical to lower montane zones, where it occupies both terra firme and várzea landscapes. In unbroken forest it typically is found in the canopy and at clearings and edges. It also inhabits secondary forest and farmland adjacent to forest. In most of its range it occurs below 500 m (1,600 ft); it reaches only 300 m (1,000 ft) in Ecuador. In Venezuela it mostly occurs below 1,000 m (3,300 ft) but reaches 2,000 m (6,600 ft). It is occasionally found above 500 m (1,600 ft) in Brazil and reaches 1,000 m (3,300 ft) in Peru.

== Behavior ==
=== Movement ===
The slender-footed tyrannulet is a year-round resident throughout its range.

=== Feeding ===
The slender-footed tyrannulet feeds insects and small fruits, especially those of mistletoes (Loranthaceae). It forages singly or in pairs and sometimes joins mixed-species feeding flocks. It feeds mostly in the forest canopy, actively moving about and gleaning food while perched or with short flight.

=== Breeding ===
The slender-footed tyrannulet's breeding season has not been defined but includes June in Colombia and March in southwestern Brazil, and spans at least August to December in southeastern Peru. Nothing else is known about the species' breeding biology.

=== Vocalization ===
The dawn song of the slender-footed tyrannulet's nominate subspecies has been described as "a soft, querulous, semimusical 'peeu, tri-ri-ri' " and its call as "an inflected 'tuwee?' ". Another author described them similarly as "a rising musical chatter" tew-tui'i'i tew-tui'i'i" and "a mewing, rising huee". The dawn song of subspecies Z. g. gilvus is "an accelerating, monotone series of musical notes chew-chu-chi'chi" and its call "a liquid duit".

== Status ==
The IUCN has assessed the slender-footed tyrannulet as being of Least Concern. It has a very large range; its population size is not known and is believed to be decreasing. No immediate threats have been identified. It is considered common in Colombia, "fairly common and widespread" in Peru, and "fairly common to common" in Venezuela. Several authors note that it is probably overlooked because it is mostly in the forest canopy. It occurs in many protected areas and "[m]uch of this species' habitat remains in relatively pristine condition".
