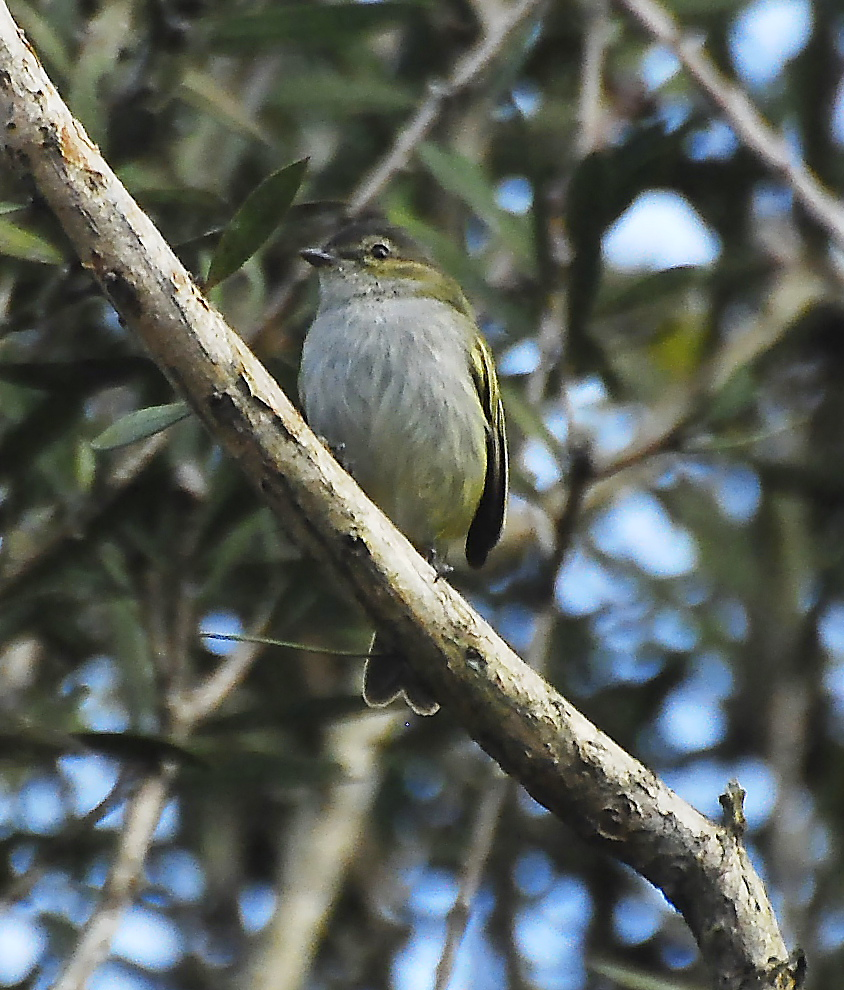

Conservation status
- Least Concern (IUCN 3.1)

Scientific classification
- Kingdom: Animalia
- Phylum: Chordata
- Class: Aves
- Order: Passeriformes
- Family: Tyrannidae
- Genus: Zimmerius
- Species: Z. parvus

Binomial name
- Zimmerius parvus (Lawrence, 1862)

Synonyms
- Zimmerius vilissimus parvus

= Mistletoe tyrannulet =

Species of bird

The mistletoe tyrannulet (Zimmerius parvus) a very small passerine bird in the family Tyrannidae, the tyrant flycatchers. It is found from Guatemala and Belize to Colombia.

== Taxonomy and systematics ==
The mistletoe tyrannulet was originally described in 1862 by the American amateur ornithologist George Newbold Lawrence under the binomial name Tyranniscus parvus. During much of the twentieth century it and several other tyrannulets were placed in genus Tyranniscus but a study published in 1977 erected the present genus Zimmerius for them. It was formerly treated as a subspecies of what was then the paltry tyrannulet (Zimmerius vilissimus sensu lato). Based on a molecular phylogenetic study published in 2013 taxonomic systems began recognizing them as separate species in 2016.

The mistletoe tyrannulet is monotypic.

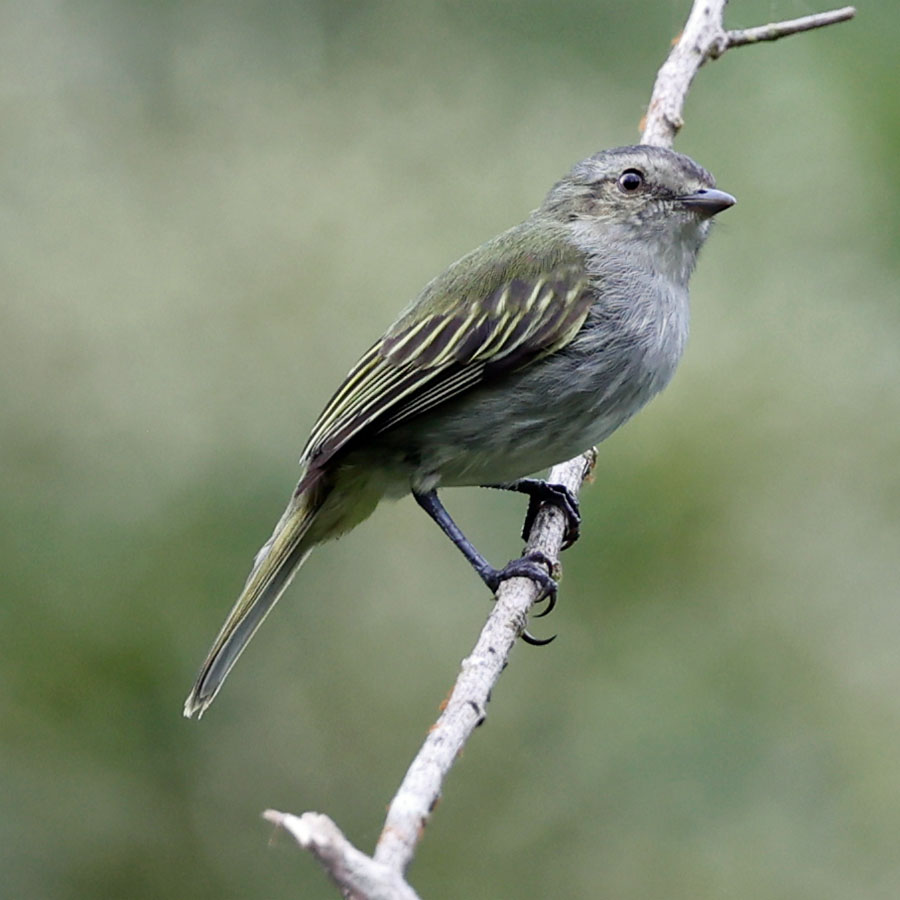
In Tapir Valley, Costa Rica, on 11 March 2024

== Description ==
The mistletoe tyrannulet is about 9.5 to 10 cm (3.7 to 3.9 in) long and weighs about 8.5 to 10 g (0.30 to 0.35 oz). The sexes have the same plumage. Adults have a grayish crown and a short but wide whitish supercilium. Their upperparts are olive green. Their wings and tail are mostly olive green with yellow edges on the wing coverts, flight feathers, and tail feathers. Their underparts are mostly off-white with faint darker streaks on the breast and sometimes a pale yellow wash on the belly and undertail coverts. Both sexes have a highly variably grayish white to grayish brown iris, a short dusky gray or black maxilla, a gray or black mandible with a dusky or brownish base, and dusky gray or blackish legs and feet. Immature birds have brown irides, an olive gray crown, a yellow tinge to the supercilium, and wider but less distinct yellow edges on the wing feathers than adults.

== Distribution and habitat ==
The mistletoe tyrannulet is found from far eastern Guatemala and far southern Belize east and south on the Caribbean sides of Honduras and Nicaragua and most of Costa Rica and Panama slightly into extreme northwestern Colombia's Antioquia and Chocó departments. It inhabits the tropical to lower temperate zones, in the interior and edges of evergreen forest both open and fairly dense. It also inhabits secondary forest, pastures and fields with scattered trees and shrubs, and gardens. It favors areas with mistletoes (Loranthaceae). In elevation it ranges from sea level to 1,400 m (4,600 ft) in Honduras, to 1,200 m (3,900 ft) in Nicaragua, to treeline at 3,000 m (9,800 ft) in Costa Rica, and to 2,300 m (7,500 ft) in Colombia.

== Behavior ==
=== Movement ===
The mistletoe tyrannulet is believed to be a year-round resident throughout its range.

=== Feeding ===
The mistletoe tyrannulet feeds on mistletoe berries, other fruits, insects, and spiders. It is an active forager, moving quickly about with its tail cocked as it searches for food. It forages singly or in pairs, at all levels of the forest but mostly from the forest mid-story to the canopy. It takes arthropods by gleaning while perched and fruit by gleaning and by briefly hovering at clusters. At least in Panama it joins mixed-species feeding flocks.

=== Breeding ===
The mistletoe tyrannulet breeds from about January to July or possibly August in Costa Rica, and its season in Panama appears to be within these dates. The female builds an oval nest with a side entrance from mosses and plant fibers bound with spider web and lined with seed down. It is typically placed about 2 to 15 m (5 to 50 ft) above the ground in a mass of moss or lichen hanging from a tree branch. Its clutch is two eggs and only the female incubates. The incubation period is 16 to 17 days and fledging occurs 18 to 20 days after hatch.

=== Vocalization ===
The mistletoe tyrannulet's dawn song is "a series of notes, the first a slow, dropping syllable and the rest short and rising...yer-de-dee, often followed by a trill". Its call is written as "pyeer", "pyeeu", or "a two-syllabled peeyup".

== Status ==
The IUCN has assessed the mistletoe tyrannulet as being of Least Concern. It has a very large range; its population size is not known and is believed to be decreasing. No immediate threats have been identified. "Mistletoe Tyrannulet is common in a wide variety of habitats, including highly modified habitats around farms and towns, and is expected to be stable in human-modified areas."
