= Melvin Alvah Traylor Jr. =

American ornithologist

Melvin Alvah Traylor Jr. (December 16, 1915 – February 11, 2008) was an American ornithologist.

He was the son of Chicago banker Melvin Alvah Traylor and Mrs. Dorothy Y. Traylor. Traylor was Lieutenant with the marines and served on Guadalcanal during World War II in 1942 where he was awarded with the Silver Star medal. As a Marine Corps officer, Mel was severely injured during the Battle of Tarawa in the Pacific theatre, where he lost one eye and suffered arm and upper body wounds during the famous beach assault. After the war Traylor continued his work for the Field Museum of Natural History in Chicago, which he had started in 1937. He made expeditions to Africa (in collaboration with Austin L. Rand), to South America, and to Asia. In 1960 he was among the members of the World Book Encyclopedia Scientific Expedition to the Himalaya led by Sir Edmund Hillary. In 1956 Traylor became assistant curator of birds in the Field Museum. Since his retirement in the 1980s he was working as curator emeritus for the Field Museum.

Traylor was among the authors (alongside Raymond A. Paynter, Ernst Mayr, G. William Cottrell, and James Lee Peters) of Check-list of Birds of the World, a standard reference work with sixteen volumes published between 1931 and 1987. Traylor described species like the Tana River cisticola and the Colombian screech-owl, and the genus Zimmerius. He made further revisions of the family Tyrannidae. The orange-eyed flycatcher (Tolmomyias traylori) is named in his honour. Traylor and Paynter were awarded with the Elliott Coues Award by the American Ornithologists' Union in 2001.

== Publications (selected) ==
- 1947: Subspecies of Aratinga acuticaudata (Fieldiana. Zoology: Volume 31, part 21; Pub. no.608)
- 1948: New Birds from Peru and Ecuador (Fieldiana. Zoology: Volume 31, part 24; Pub. no.619)
- 1949: Notes on Some Veracruz Birds (Fieldiana. Zoology: Volume 31, part 32; Pub. no.635)
- 1951: Notes on Some Peruvian Birds (Fieldiana. Zoology: Volume 31, part 51; Pub. no.676)
- 1952: Notes on Birds from the Marcapata Valley, Cuzco, Peru (Fieldiana. Zoology: Volume 34, part 3; Pub. no.691)
- 1958: Birds of Northeastern Peru (Fieldiana. Zoology: Volume 35, part 5; Pub. no.844)
- 1959: Three New Birds from West Africa (Fieldiana. Zoology: Volume 39, part 25; Pub. no.865) (with A. L. Rand)
- 1961: Notes on Nepal Birds (Fieldiana. Zoology: Volume 35, part 8; Pub. no.917)
- 1962: New Birds from Barotseland (Fieldiana. Zoology: Volume 44, part 12; Pub. no.955)
- 1964: Further Notes on Nepal Birds (Chicago Natural History Museum)
- 1967: A Collection of Birds from Szechwan, 1967 (Chicago Natural History Museum, Fieldiana: Zoology, Volume 53, Number 1: pages 1–67 with 1 map figure)
- 1967: Collection of Birds from the Ivory Coast (Fieldiana. Zoology: Volume 51, part 7; Pub. no.1033)
- 1968: Distributional Notes on Nepal Birds, 1968 (Chicago Natural History Museum, Fieldiana: Zoology, Volume 53, Number 3: pages 147–203)
- 1977: A Classification of the Tyrant Flycatchers (Tyrannidae), 1977 (Harvard University, Cambridge, Massachusetts, Bulletin of the Museum of Comparative Zoology, Volume 148, Number 4: pages 129–184 with 10 figures and 4 tables)
- 1977: Ornithological Gazetteer of Ecuador (with Raymond A. Paynter)
- 1982: Notes on Tyrant Flycatchers (Aves: Tyrannidae) (Fieldiana. New Series Zoology: Volume 13; Pub. no.1338)
- 1988: Geographic Variation and Evolution in South American Cistothorus platensis (Aves: Troglodytidae) (Fieldiana. New Series Zoology: Volume 48; Pub. no.1392)
