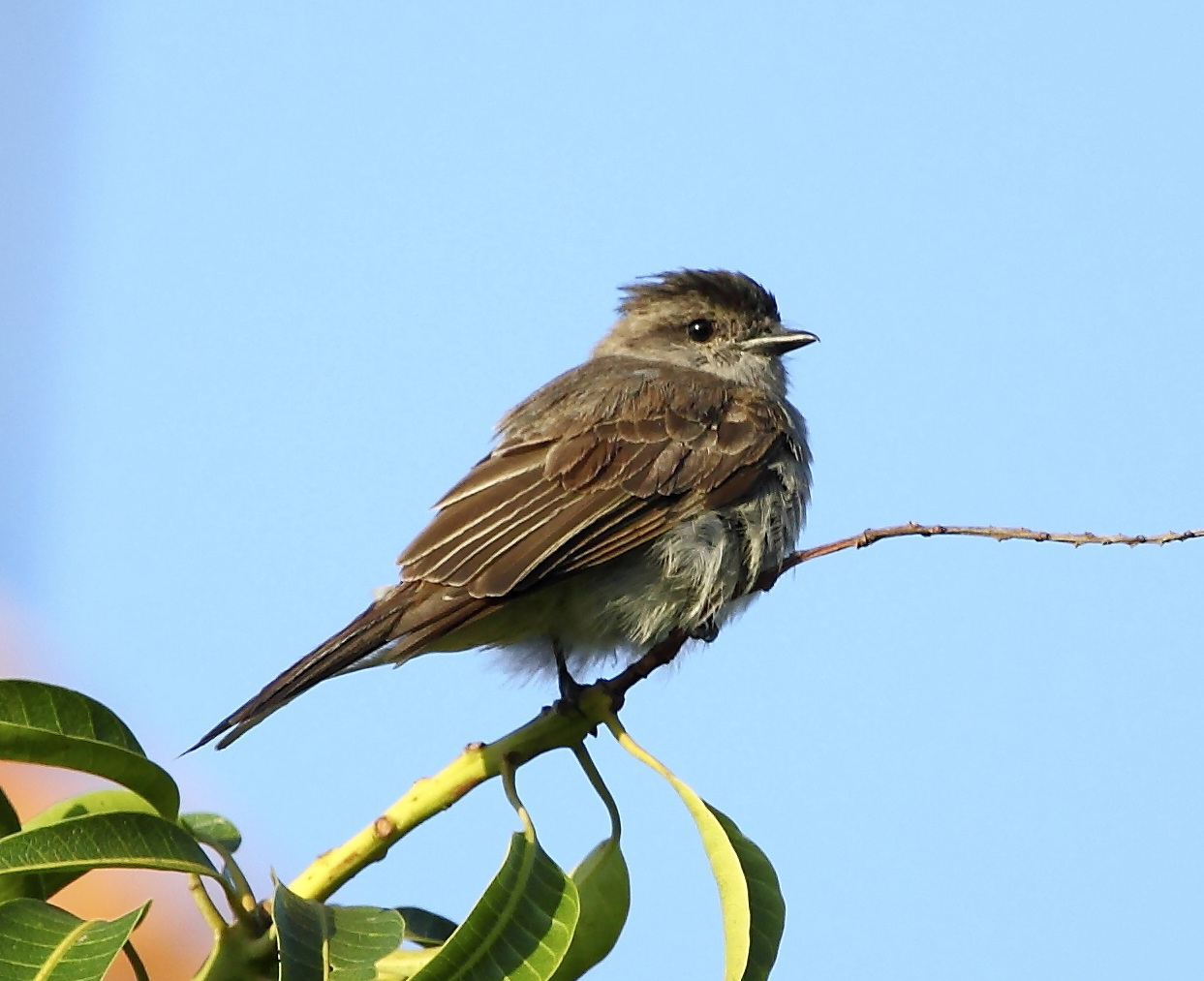
- At São Roque de Minas, Minas Gerais state, Brazil

Conservation status
- Least Concern (IUCN 3.1)

Scientific classification
- Kingdom: Animalia
- Phylum: Chordata
- Class: Aves
- Order: Passeriformes
- Family: Tyrannidae
- Genus: Empidonomus
- Species: E. aurantioatrocristatus

Binomial name
- Empidonomus aurantioatrocristatus (d'Orbigny & Lafresnaye, 1837)
- Year-round Non-Breeding The range shown as year-round is inaccurate; see the Movement section for details.

Synonyms
- Tyrannus aurantio-atro cristatus; Griseotyrannus aurantioatrocristatus

= Crowned slaty flycatcher =

Species of bird

The crowned slaty flycatcher (Empidonomus aurantioatrocristatus) is a species of bird in the family Tyrannidae, the tyrant flycatchers. It is found in every mainland South American country except Suriname though only as a vagrant to Chile, French Guiana, and Venezuela. There are also single records of it in Panama and the U.S. state of Louisiana.

== Taxonomy ==
The crowned slaty flycatcher was formerly described in 1837 as Tyrannus aurantio-atro cristatus by the French naturalists Alcide d'Orbigny and Frédéric de Lafresnaye based on a specimen collected in the Vallegrande Province, Santa Cruz Department, Bolivia. The specific epithet aurantioatrocristatus combines the late Medieval Latin aurantius meaning "orange-coloured" with Latin ater, atri meaning "black" and cristatus meaning "crested". The species was for long placed together with the variegated flycatcher in the genus Empidonomus that had been introduced in 1860 by the German ornithologists Jean Cabanis and Ferdinand Heine. In 1984 the American ornithologist Wesley E. Lanyon proposed that the crowned slaty flycatcher should be moved to its own genus Griseotyrannus based on the distinctive syringeal morphology. The two species have similar morphology, behaviour, and vocalizations and when in 2020 a large molecular phylogenetic study of the suboscines found that the genetic divergence between the two species was relatively small, the crowned slaty flycatcher was returned to Empidonomus.

Two subspecies are recognised:

- E. a. pallidiventris Hellmayr, CE, 1929 – eastern Brazil (Rio Tapajós to northern Goiás and Piauí)
- E. a. aurantioatrocristatus (d'Orbigny & de Lafresnaye, 1837) – Bolivia to northern Argentina and southern Brazil; winters northward to western Amazonia

== Description ==
The crowned slaty flycatcher is 16.5 to 18 cm (6.5 to 7.1 in) long and weighs 27 to 46 g (0.95 to 1.6 oz). The sexes have the same plumage. Adults of the nominate subspecies have a flattened black crown with a mostly hidden golden yellow patch in the center, a gray supercilium, and dusky ear coverts. Their upperparts are brownish gray. Their wings and tail are dusky with lighter feather edges. Their underparts are light gray with a yellowish tinge on the belly. Subspecies E. a. pallideventris is smaller than the nominate, with much lighter pale grayish olive upperparts and lighter mouse-gray underparts. Juveniles have a paler and more contrasting supercilium than adults, with white edges on the wing coverts and flight feathers and thin rufous edges on the tail feathers. Both subspecies have a brown iris, a black bill, and black legs and feet.

== Distribution and habitat ==
The nominate subspecies of the crowned slaty flycatcher has by far the larger range of the two. It is found in southern Colombia, eastern Ecuador and Peru, northern and eastern Bolivia, Paraguay, western Uruguay, southern Guyana, northern and central Argentina to Río Negro Province, and Brazil. Its range in Brazil is roughly bounded on the east by western Minas Gerais, Paraná, Santa Catarina, and Rio Grande do Sul. It has also been recorded as a vagrant in Chile, French Guiana, and Venezuela and once each in Panama and Louisiana. Subspecies E. a. pallideventris is found only in Brazil in an area roughly bounded by eastern Pará, Maranhão, northern Goiás, and northern Mato Grosso.

== Behavior ==
=== Movement ===
The crowned slaty flycatcher is a partial migrant. Subspecies E. a. pallideventris is a year-round resident. The nominate subspecies breeds in the area roughly south of a line from east-central Bolivia east to eastern Mato Grosso do Sul in Brazil and vacates that area for the austral winter. That population regularly migrates north into northern Bolivia and Amazonian Brazil, Peru, Ecuador, and southeastern Colombia. The nominate subspecies is a year-round resident in west-central Brazil between its breeding-only and wintering ranges. There are very few records in Venezuela. It fairly regularly reaches Guyana but is known in French Guiana and Chile only as a vagrant. In addition there are a few records west of the Andes in Ecuador and the abovementioned single records in Panama and Louisiana.

During the breeding season the crowned slaty flycatcher inhabits a variety of somewhat open landscapes including deciduous and gallery forest, light woodlands, scrublands, and cerrado with scattered trees. Birds wintering in the Amazon Basin primarily inhabit the canopy on the edge of forest and openings and clearings within it. While wintering there they occur in both varzea and terra firme forest. In elevation the species is found in Brazil mostly from sea level to 1,200 m (3,900 ft) and occasionally higher. It reaches 1,200 m (3,900 ft) in Colombia, 1,100 m (3,600 ft) in Ecuador, and 1,000 m (3,300 ft) in Peru. The confirmed records in Venezuela were at elevations of about 250 m (800 ft) though there is a sight record at 2,500 m (8,200 ft).

=== Feeding ===
The crowned slaty flycatcher feeds on insects and fruit though details are lacking. It usually forages singly, taking insects on the wing with sallies from a perch atop a tree or shrub.

=== Breeding ===
The crowned slaty flycatcher's breeding season has not been fully defined but apparently begins before November and continues into January. Its nest is a loose cup made from small twigs and leaf stems lined with softer rootlets and grass. It is typically placed in a branch fork near the trunk of a tree about 2 to 6 m (7 to 20 ft) above the ground. The clutch is two to three eggs that are pale cream with purplish brown spots. The incubation period is about 15 to 16 days and fledging occurs about 16 days after hatch. Details of parental care are not known. Shiny cowbirds (Molothrus bonariensis) sometimes parasitize the nest.

=== Vocalization ===
The crowned slaty flycatcher is fairly quiet during the breeding season and usually silent in its winter range. Its song is a "thin buzzy and rising be-bee-beee-beeez, low whistling pree-ee-ee-er, and a series of squeaky notes, or a two part tsi-tsitsewt-tsi-tsébidit phrase". Its calls include a "rather weak pseek or high thin pseeet" and "thin, high tzeer and peeping notes".

== Status ==
The IUCN has assessed the crowned flycatcher as being of Least Concern. It has an very large range; its population size is not known but is believed to be stable. No immediate threats have been identified. It is considered fairly common in Brazil. It is an "abundant migrant" in Colombia, a "fairly common austral migrant" in Ecuador, and an "uncommon austral migrant" in Peru. "The species occurs in many protected areas and given its large range and wide habitat preferences, including tolerance of converted and disturbed habitats, it is unlikely to be at any risk."

== See also ==
- List of long species names
