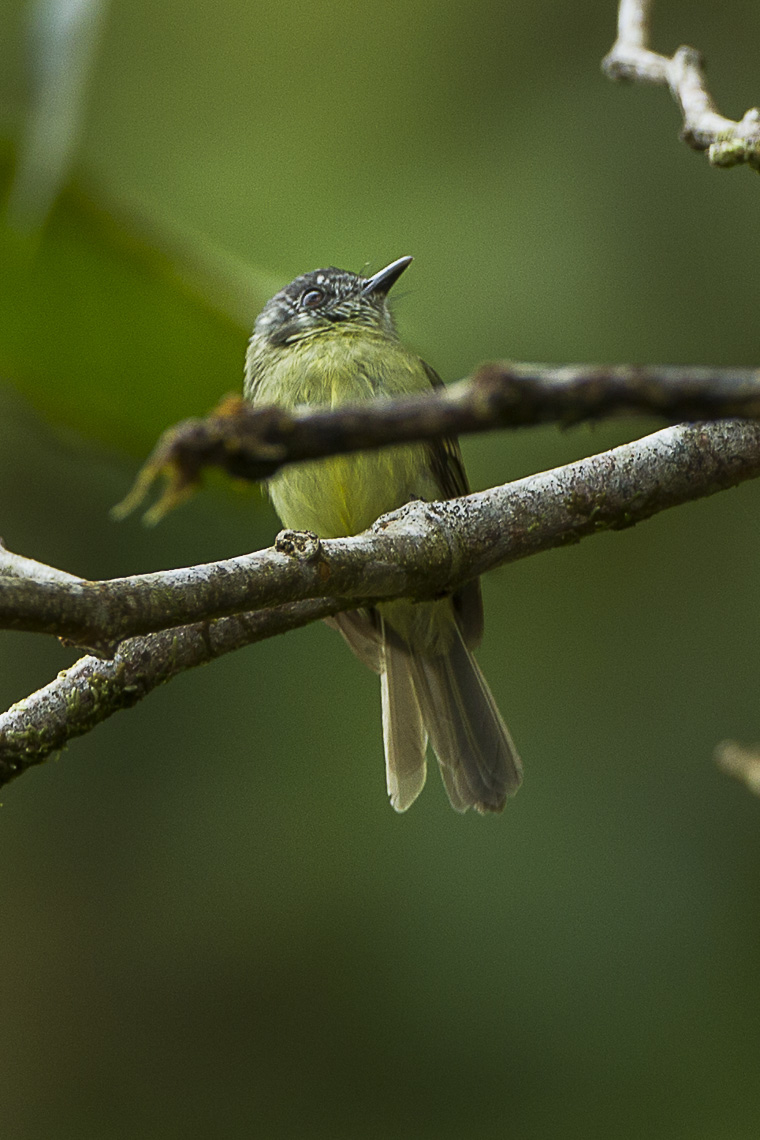

Conservation status
- Least Concern (IUCN 3.1)

Scientific classification
- Kingdom: Animalia
- Phylum: Chordata
- Class: Aves
- Order: Passeriformes
- Family: Tyrannidae
- Genus: Pogonotriccus
- Species: P. poecilotis

Binomial name
- Pogonotriccus poecilotis (Sclater, PL, 1862)

Synonyms
- Leptopogon poecilotis; Phylloscartes poecilotis

= Variegated bristle tyrant =

Species of bird

The variegated bristle tyrant (Pogonotriccus poecilotis) is a species of passerine bird in the family Tyrannidae, the tyrant flycatchers. It is found in Colombia, Ecuador, Peru, and Venezuela.

== Taxonomy and systematics ==
The variegated bristle tyrant was originally described as Leptopogon poecilotis. It was later moved into genus Pogonotriccus, which was still later merged into genus Phylloscartes. Beginning in 2016 taxonomic systems resurrected Pogonotriccus for this species and a few others.

The variegated bristle tyrant is monotypic. A proposed subspecies, P. p. pifanoi, has not been accepted by most taxonomists.

== Description ==
The variegated bristle tyrant is about 11.5 cm (4.5 in) long; three individuals weighed between 7 and 9.5 g (0.25 and 0.34 oz). The sexes have the same plumage. Adults have a slate gray crown. Their lores and narrow supercilium are grizzled white. Their ear coverts are grizzled white bisected by a vertical black crescent. Their back and rump are olive green. Their wings are dusky with yellowish edges on the flight feathers. Their wing coverts are dusky with wide tawny buff tips that show as two wing bars. Their tail is dusky olive. Their throat is whitish and their breast, flanks, and belly bright yellow with an olive wash on the breast. They have a brown iris, a black maxilla, an orange, yellow-orange, or yellow-brown mandible, and gray or light brown legs and feet.

== Distribution and habitat ==
The variegated bristle tyrant has a disjunct distribution. It is found in the Serranía del Perijá that staddles the Colombia-Venezuela border, locally in the Venezuelan states of Mérida, Táchira, Lara, and Barinas, in all three ranges of the Colombian Andes, and along the lengths of Ecuador and Peru on the eastern slope of the Andes. It inhabits humid subtropical montane forest, extending to wet cloudforest in Venezuela. In elevation it ranges between 1,500 and 2,300 m (4,900 and 7,500 ft) in Venezuela and Colombia, between 1,500 and 2,000 m (4,900 and 6,600 ft) in Ecuador, and between 1,400 and 2,300 m (4,600 and 7,500 ft) in Peru.

== Behavior ==
=== Movement ===
The variegated bristle tyrant is believed to be a year-round resident throughout its range.

=== Feeding ===
The variegated bristle tyrant feeds on insects. It forages in the forest's understory to mid-story, typically perching upright and making short sallies to glean prey from nearby vegetation. It usually forages singly or in pairs and often joins mixed-species feeding flocks.

=== Breeding ===
The variegated bristle tyrant's breeding season has not been fully defined but appears to span at least between November and May. Its nest is a globe; one well-described one was made entirely of seed floss from a Spirotheca tree. It was suspended from overhanging tree roots at the top of an earthen bank. Another nest had a clutch of two nestlings. Nothing else is known about the species' breeding biology.

=== Vocalization ===
The variegated bristle tyrant's song has been described as "a high, sharp note followed by a rising chippering trill: tsew! tsi-tree'tee'tee'ti'ti'ti". Another author described it as "tsit-tsit-tsit-ts-ts-ts-tseweeeét". Its calls include "a high tsew...a high tsee-tsee and tsi'wit".

== Status ==
The IUCN has assessed the variegated bristle tyrant as being of Least Concern. It has a very large range; its population size is not known and is believed to be decreasing. No immediate threats have been identified. It is considered locally fairly common in Venezuela, fairly common in Colombia, "scarce" in Ecuador, and "uncommon and perhaps local" in Peru. It "occupies humid montane forest, and so as is true of all species that are restricted to forest, it is vulnerable to habitat degradation or loss".
