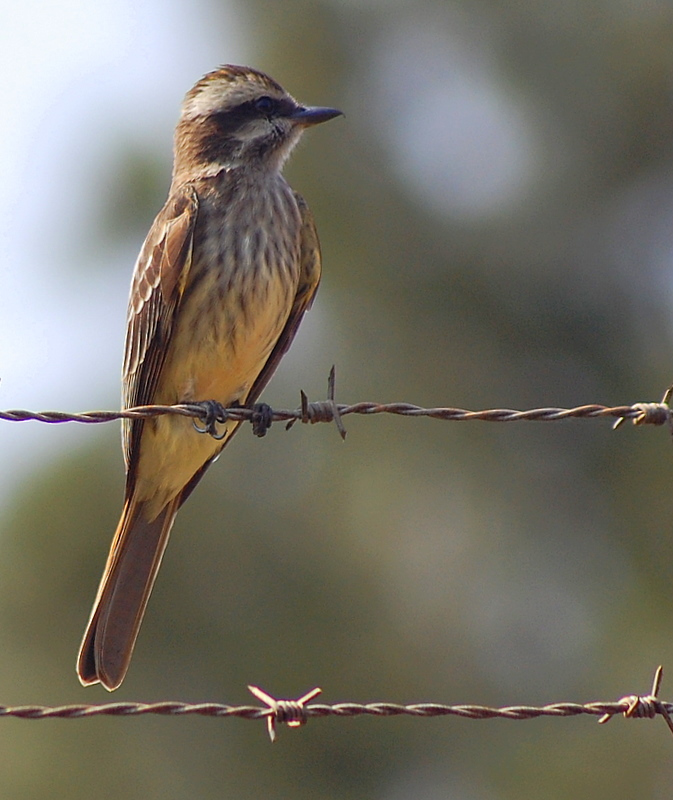

Conservation status
- Least Concern (IUCN 3.1)

Scientific classification
- Kingdom: Animalia
- Phylum: Chordata
- Class: Aves
- Order: Passeriformes
- Family: Tyrannidae
- Genus: Empidonomus
- Species: E. varius

Binomial name
- Empidonomus varius (Vieillot, 1818)
- Breeding Year-round Non-Breeding

Synonyms
- Empidomonus varius (lapsus)

= Variegated flycatcher =

Species of bird

The variegated flycatcher (Empidonomus varius) is a species of bird in the family Tyrannidae, the tyrant flycatchers. It is found on Trinidad and in every mainland South American country except Chile. In addition it has been documented as a vagrant in several U.S. states and the Canadian province of Ontario.

== Taxonomy ==
The variegated flycatcher was formally described in 1818 as Muscicapa varia by the French ornithologist Louis Vieillot. He based his account on "Del Chorreado debaxo" from Paraguay that had been described in 1805 by the Spanish naturalist Félix de Azara. The variegated flycatcher is now placed together with the crowned slaty flycatcher in the genus Empidonomus that was introduced in 1860 by the German ornithologists Jean Cabanis and Ferdinand Heine.

Two subspecies are recognised:

- E. v. varius (Vieillot, LJP, 1818) – southeastern Brazil to Paraguay, Uruguay, northern Argentina, eastern Peru, and eastern Bolivia
- E. v. rufinus (Spix, JB, 1825) – eastern Venezuela to the Guianas, and northern and western Amazonian Brazil

== Description ==
The variegated flycatcher is 18 to 19 cm (7.1 to 7.5 in) long and weighs about 25 g (0.88 oz). The sexes have the same plumage. Adults of the nominate subspecies have a blackish or blackish brown crown with a mostly hidden yellow patch in the center, a long white supercilium that extends almost around the nape, a wide dusky band from the lores to the ear coverts, and whitish cheeks with a dusky band below them. Their upperparts are mostly dusky or dark brownish with pale whitish streaks that give a mottled appearance. Their rump is darker brown with rufous edges on the feathers and their uppertail coverts are rufous. Their tail is dark brown or blackish with rufous feather edges. Their wings are dusky with wide white edges on the coverts and flight feathers. Their throat is dingy whitish and the rest of their underparts are yellowish white. Their breast and sides have indistinct darker streaks. Subspecies E. v. rufinus is smaller than the nominate with paler, more brownish upperparts with more olivaceous streaks and less bold streaking on the underparts. Juveniles do not have the adults' crown patch and have unstreaked underparts. Both subspecies have a dark iris, a blackish bill with a pale pinkish base to the mandible, and black legs and feet.

== Distribution and habitat ==
Subspecies E. v. rufinus of the variegated flycatcher is the more northerly of the two. It is found on Trinidad, in the Venezuelan Andes and coastal mountains, and in south and east of the country. From Venezuela its range continues east through the Guianas and northern and eastern Brazil east to the Atlantic in Pará, southeast to Bahia, and in the southwest almost to Bolivia. The nominate subspecies is found in southwestern Venezuela; eastern Colombia, Ecuador, and Peru; central and eastern Bolivia; central and southern Brazil; Paraguay; Uruguay; and northern Argentina at least as far south as Entre Ríos Province. In addition it has been documented in the U.S. states of Florida, Maine, Michigan, Tennessee, Texas, and Washington and in Ontario Province.

The variegated flycatcher inhabits a variety of somewhat open landscapes. These include the edges of primary forest, secondary and gallery forest, savanna with scattered shrubs and trees, large clearings, and sometimes parks. In migration it occasionally is found in the crown of unbroken terra firme forest. In elevation it ranges from sea level to 1,200 m (3,900 ft) in Brazil. It reaches 400 m (1,300 ft) in Colombia, 500 m (1,600 ft) in Ecuador, and 500 m (1,600 ft) in Peru. In Venezuela north of the Orinoco River it reaches 1,900 m (6,200 ft) and south of it 1,300 m (4,300 ft).

== Behavior ==
=== Movement ===
The nominate subspecies of the variegated flycatcher is a partial migrant. The population in southeastern Bolivia, southern Brazil, Paraguay, Uruguay, and Argentina vacates that area for the austral winter, moving north in Brazil and northwest into Peru, Ecuador, Colombia, and the Venezuelan Andes. Subspecies E. v. rufinus and the more northerly population of the nominate are year-round residents. The exact border between the year-round residents and the migratory population is not clear. The North American records are believed to be members of the migratory population that overshot their usual destination.

=== Feeding ===
The variegated flycatcher feeds primarily on insects but also includes fruit in its diet; the migrants are thought to consume more fruit on their wintering grounds. It usually forages singly but occasionally joins mixed-species feeding flocks. It perches in the open, usually up to the forest's mid-level but occasionally in a tree top. It takes most insect prey on the wing by hawking from the perch. It takes fruit and some insects from foliage while briefly hovering after a sally from the perch.

=== Breeding ===
The variegated flycatcher's breeding seasons are almost unknown but include October to December in Argentina. Its nest is flattish bowl made from small twigs and leaf stems lined with softer rootlets and leaf ribs. It is typically placed in the fork of a horizontal branch up to about 8 m (25 ft) above the ground. The usual clutch is two to three eggs that are yellowish white with chestnut-brown and gray markings. The incubation period, time to fledging, and details of parental care are not known. Shiny cowbirds (Molothrus bonariensis) sometimes parasitize the nest.

=== Vocalization ===
The variegated flycatcher is usually rather quiet. It makes a "harsh "chee-chee-chu" call" whose last note is dragged out and also weak "high-pitched, thin and nasal pseee, zureee or zreeetee" calls, sometimes in a series. In Brazil it makes a "ver/extr. high, thin feeee-io" call.

== Status ==
The IUCN has assessed the variegated flycatcher as being of Least Concern. It has an very large range; its population size is not known but is believed to be stable. No immediate threats have been identified. It is considered fairly common in Brazil. In Venezuela subspecies E. v. rufinus is considered a fairly common resident and the nominate a common migrant. As a migrant it is common in Colombia, uncommon in Ecuador, and uncommon in Peru. It is found in may protected areas both public and private. It is "tolerant of converted and disturbed habitats [and] considered unlikely to be at any risk in the near future".
