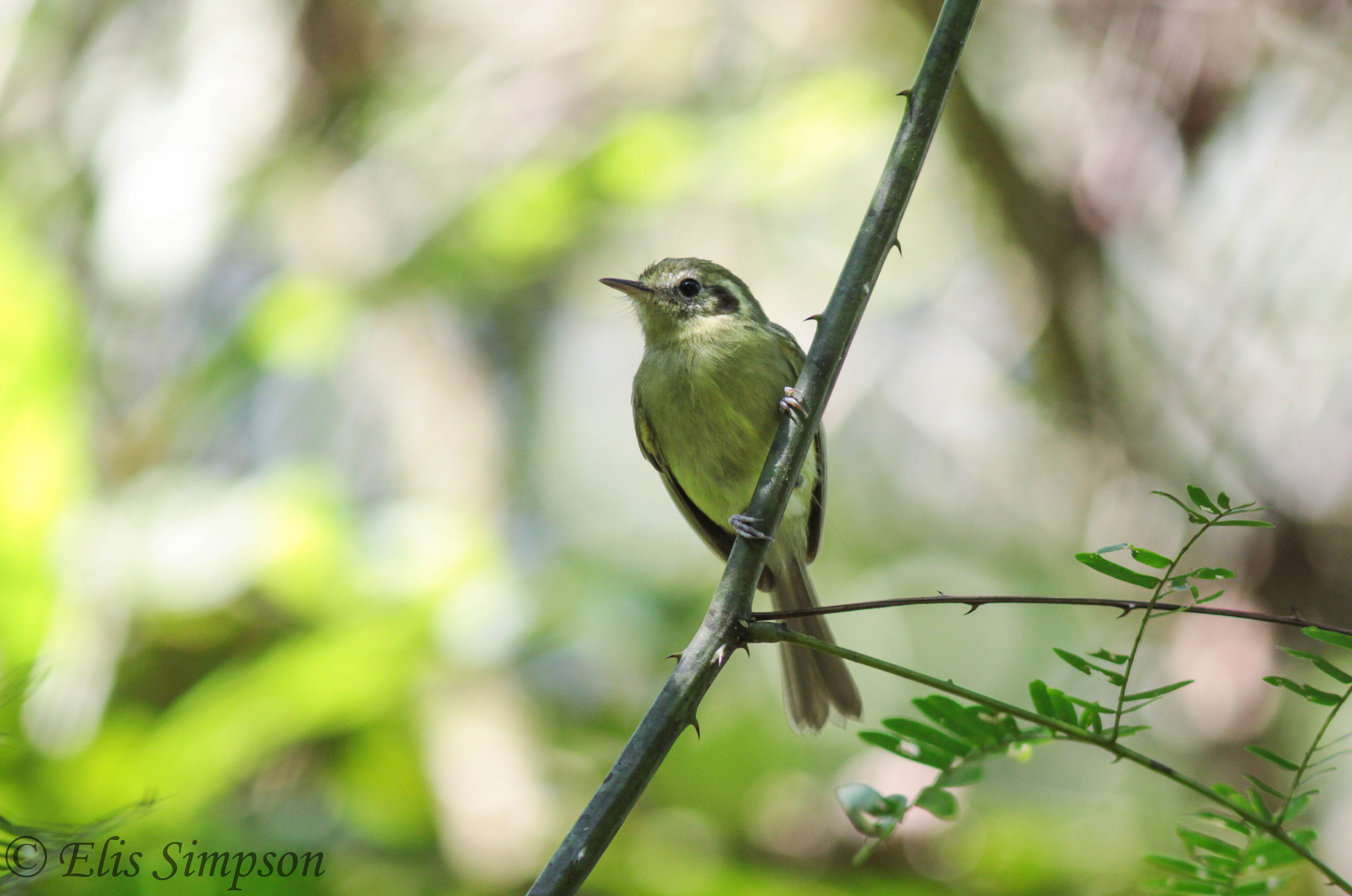

Conservation status
- Near Threatened (IUCN 3.1)

Scientific classification
- Kingdom: Animalia
- Phylum: Chordata
- Class: Aves
- Order: Passeriformes
- Family: Tyrannidae
- Genus: Pogonotriccus
- Species: P. paulista

Binomial name
- Pogonotriccus paulista (Ihering, HFA & Ihering, R, 1907)

Synonyms
- Phylloscartes paulistus; Phylloscartes paulista

= Sao Paulo bristle tyrant =

São Paulo bristle tyrant

Species of bird

The Sao Paulo bristle tyrant (Pogonotriccus paulista), or Sao Paulo tyrannulet (Phylloscartes paulista), is a Near Threatened species of bird in the tyrant flycatcher family Tyrannidae. It is found in Argentina, Brazil, and Paraguay.

== Taxonomy and systematics ==
The Sao Paulo bristle tyrant was formally described in 1907 by the German-Brazilian naturalists Hermann von Ihering and his son Rodolpho von Ihering. They placed it in the genus Phylloscartes and coined the binomial name Phylloscartes paulista. The type locality was specified as Salto Grande in the Brazilian state of São Paulo. The species' English name and specific epithet are from São Paulo state, the type locality. (Note: For the spelling of the specific epithet see: Straube, F.C. and Pacheco, J.F. (2002).) The Sao Paulo bristle tyrant was formerly known in some taxonomic systems as the Sao Paulo tyrannulet.

A comprehensive molecular phylogenetic study of the suboscines by Mike Harvey and collaborators, published in 2020, found that the then Phylloscartes paulista and several other species were embedded in a clade containing the bristle tyrants in the genus Pogonotriccus. Based on this study, most systems moved the species to the resurrected genus Pogonotriccus and changed its English name from Sao Paulo tyrannulet to Sao Paulo bristle tyrant. However, as of late 2024 BirdLife International's Handbook of the Birds of the World retain the names Sao Paulo tyrannulet and Phylloscartes paulista.

The Sao Paulo bristle tyrant is monotypic: no subspecies are recognized.

== Description ==
The Sao Paulo bristle tyrant is 10 to 11 cm (3.9 to 4.3 in) long and weighs 7 to 8 g (0.25 to 0.28 oz). The sexes have the same plumage. Adults have an olive crown, nape, back, rump, and tail. They have a thin yellow supercilium that goes beyond the eye and bends downward at the nape. Their ear coverts are yellowish with a wide black crescent between them and the extended supercilium. Their wings are dusky olive to brownish with thin yellowish olive edges on the flight feathers. Their wing coverts are dusky olive with yellowish olive tips that show as two wing bars. Their chin, throat, and underparts are dull yellow with a heavy wash of olive on the breast. Both sexes have a brown iris, a long pointed black bill, and gray legs and feet.

== Distribution and habitat ==
The Sao Paulo bristle tyrant is a bird of the Atlantic Forest. It is found from Brazil's states of Espírito Santo south to Santa Catarina and west into eastern Paraguay and extreme northeastern Argentina's Misiones Province. It inhabits the interior and edges of humid forest in the tropical and upper tropical zones. In elevation it mostly occurs below 500 m (1,600 ft) but locally reaches 1,000 m (3,300 ft).

== Behavior ==
=== Movement ===
The Sao Paulo bristle tyrant is a year-round resident.

=== Feeding ===
The Sao Paulo bristle tyrant feeds on arthropods. It typically forages from the forest's understory to its mid-story, perching upright and making short upward sallies to snatch or hover-glean prey from vegetation. It is usually seen singly or in pairs and almost always as part of a mixed-species feeding flock.

=== Breeding ===
The Sao Paulo bristle tyrant's breeding season is thought to span from September to December. Nothing else is known about the species' breeding biology.

=== Vocalization ===
The Sao Paulo bristle tyrant's song is a "very/extr. high, strident 'tits' or 'ti-seet' (repeated)".

== Status ==
The IUCN originally in 1988 assessed the Sao Paulo bristle tyrant as Threatened, then in 1994 as Vulnerable, and since 2004 as Near Threatened. Its estimated population of 2500 to 10,000 mature individuals is believed to be decreasing. "Less than 20% of the original extent of [the species'] habitat remains intact owing to agricultural conversion and deforestation for coffee, banana and rubber plantations [but] habitat destruction in the Brazilian range of the species has slowed significantly although is continuing in places, and the prospects of future losses are not as dire as in the last decades." It is considered rare to uncommon and is found "at relatively few sites". "Destruction and fragmentation of lowland Atlantic Forest has had devastating effect on this species' habitat." It does occur in several protected areas in Brazil and in at least one in each of Paraguay and Argentina.
