= Venezuelan bristle tyrant =

Conservation status
- Near Threatened (IUCN 3.1)

Scientific classification
- Kingdom: Animalia
- Phylum: Chordata
- Class: Aves
- Order: Passeriformes
- Family: Tyrannidae
- Genus: Pogonotriccus
- Species: P. venezuelanus

Binomial name
- Pogonotriccus venezuelanus Berlepsch, 1907

Species of bird

The Venezuelan bristle tyrant (Pogonotriccus venezuelanus) is a Near Threatened species of passerine bird in the family Tyrannidae, the tyrant flycatchers. It is endemic to Venezuela.

== Taxonomy and systematics ==
The Venezuelan bristle tyrant was originally described as Pogonotriccus venezuelanus. Genus Pogonotriccus was later merged into genus Phylloscartes. Beginning in 2016 taxonomic systems resurrected Pogonotriccus for this species and a few others.

The Venezuelan bristle tyrant is monotypic.

== Description ==
The Venezuelan bristle tyrant is about 11.5 cm (4.5 in) long and weighs 8 to 9 g (0.28 to 0.32 oz). The sexes have the same plumage. Adults have a gray crown, yellowish white lores, and a prominent yellowish white eye-ring on an otherwise mottled yellowish face. Their ear coverts have a blackish crescent at the top and rear. Their back and rump are olive. Their wings are blackish with pale yellow edges on the flight feathers. Their wing coverts are blackish with pale yellow tips that show as two wing bars. Their tail is olive. Their throat and underparts are bright yellow with a very light olive wash on the breast. Both sexes have a brown iris, a long, pointed, blackish bill with a whitish or pinkish base to the mandible, and gray legs and feet.

== Distribution and habitat ==
The Venezuelan bristle tyrant has two separate ranges in Venezuela. On is in the coastal mountains from Carabobo through Aragua into the Federal District. The other is in the interior mountains of southern Aragua and Miranda states. The species inhabits humid montane forest where it favors mid-elevation cloudforest heavy with mosses. In elevation it ranges between 950 and 1,400 m (3,100 and 4,600 ft).

== Behavior ==
=== Movement ===
The Venezuelan bristle tyrant is a year-round resident throughout its range.

=== Feeding ===
The Venezuelan bristle tyrant feeds on arthropods. It forages in the forest's mid-story up into the lower canopy, typically perching upright and making short upward sallies to snatch or hover-glean prey from vegetation. It usually forages singly or in pairs and usually as part of a mixed-species feeding flock.

=== Breeding ===
The Venezuelan bristle tyrant is thought to breed between January and April or May. Nothing else is known about the species' breeding biology.

=== Vocalization ===
The Venezuelan bristle tyrant's song is "a fast trill, ch'e'e'e'e'd'd'd'd'd'e'e'eWEEP!" and its call a "soft double-noted...che'dip".

== Status ==
The IUCN has assessed the Venezuelan bristle tyrant as Near Threatened. It has a small range; its population size is not known and is believed to be decreasing. "Although there is still extensive forest cover in parts of its limited range, deforestation has been severe around Caracas, and many other areas have also been degraded ". It is considered fairly common and occurs in at least one national park and probably also in other protected areas.
