= Chapman's bristle tyrant =

Conservation status
- Least Concern (IUCN 3.1)

Scientific classification
- Kingdom: Animalia
- Phylum: Chordata
- Class: Aves
- Order: Passeriformes
- Family: Tyrannidae
- Genus: Pogonotriccus
- Species: P. chapmani

Binomial name
- Pogonotriccus chapmani (Gilliard, 1940)

Synonyms
- Phylloscartes chapmani

Species of bird

Chapman's bristle tyrant (Pogonotriccus chapmani), also known as Chapman's tyrannulet, is a species of passerine bird in the family Tyrannidae, the tyrant flycatchers. It is found in Brazil, Guyana, and Venezuela.

== Taxonomy and systematics ==
Chapman's bristle tyrant was originally described as Phylloscartes chapmani. Its specific epithet honors Dr. Frank M. Chapman. Beginning in 2016 taxonomic systems resurrected genus Pogonotriccus for this species and a few others.

Chapman's bristle tyrant has two subspecies, the nominate P. c. chapmani (Gilliard, 1940) and P. c. duidae (Phelps, WH & Phelps, WH Jr, 1951).

== Description ==
Chapman's bristle tyrant is about 12 cm (4.7 in) long and weighs 7 to 8 g (0.25 to 0.28 oz). The sexes have the same plumage. Adults of the nominate subspecies have a whitish supercilium and a white eye-ring on an otherwise gray and white grizzled face. A black line through the eye continues as a crescent behind the ear coverts. Their crown, back, and rump are dull olive; the crown is slightly darker. Their wings are dusky with pale buffy yellow to buffy white edges on the flight feathers. Their wing coverts are dusky with wide buff tips that show as two conspicuous wing bars. Their tail is dusky olive. Their throat and breast are olive-yellow and their flanks and belly pale yellow. Subspecies P. c. duidae has paler and more yellow-green upperparts than the nominate, and the edges of the flight feathers are more yellowish (less buff). Both subspecies have a brown iris, a short pointed black bill with a pale yellow base to the mandible, and gray legs and feet.

== Distribution and habitat ==
Sources differ in their range statements for Chapman's bristle tyrant, though all agree that it is found on tepuis in some part of the area where Venezuela, Guyana, and Brazil meet. The International Ornithological Committee places both subspecies only in Venezuela. Hilty's Birds of Venezuela treats the species as a Venezuelan endemic but states it is "Doubtless in adj. Brazil and Guyana". The Clements taxonomy places the nominate subspecies in Venezuela's Bolívar and Amazonas states and subspecies P. c. duidae on Cerro de la Neblina in far southern Amazonas and perhaps on the Brazilian side of that tepui as well. The South American Classification Committee of the American Ornithological Society places the species in all three countries without noting which subspecies is where. The Cornell Lab of Ornithology's Birds of the World places the nominate subspecies in all three countries. It places P. c. duidae on Cerro Duida in Amazonas and Cerro de la Neblina in Amazonas and Brazil.

Chapman's bristle tyrant inhabits humid montane evergreen forest on the slopes of tepuis, where it especially favors areas heavy with mosses. In elevation it ranges between 1,000 and 2,000 m (3,300 and 6,600 ft).

== Behavior ==
=== Movement ===
Chapman's bristle tyrant is a year-round resident.

=== Feeding ===
The diet of Chapman's bristle tyrant has not been studied but is assumed to be insects. It forages in the forest's understory to mid-story, typically perching upright and making short upward sallies to glean prey from the underside of vegetation. It usually forages in pairs or family groups and often joins mixed-species feeding flocks.

=== Breeding ===
Nothing is known about the breeding biology of Chapman's bristle tyrant.

=== Vocalization ===
As of late 2024 xeno-canto had only three recordings of Chapman's bristle tyrant vocalizations. The Cornell Lab's Macaulay Library had several. The species' vocalizations have not been described.

== Status ==
The IUCN has assessed Chapman's bristle tyrant as being of Least Concern. Its population size is not known and is believed to be decreasing. No immediate threats have been identified. "Rare and local on Sierra de Lema [in Bolívar]...much more numerous on many tepuis westward". "Tepuis within its range are rather unaffected by human disturbance owing to their inaccessibility, but vegetation is especially sensitive to fire and other disturbances; gold-prospectors and uncontrolled tourism have recently had severe local impacts."
