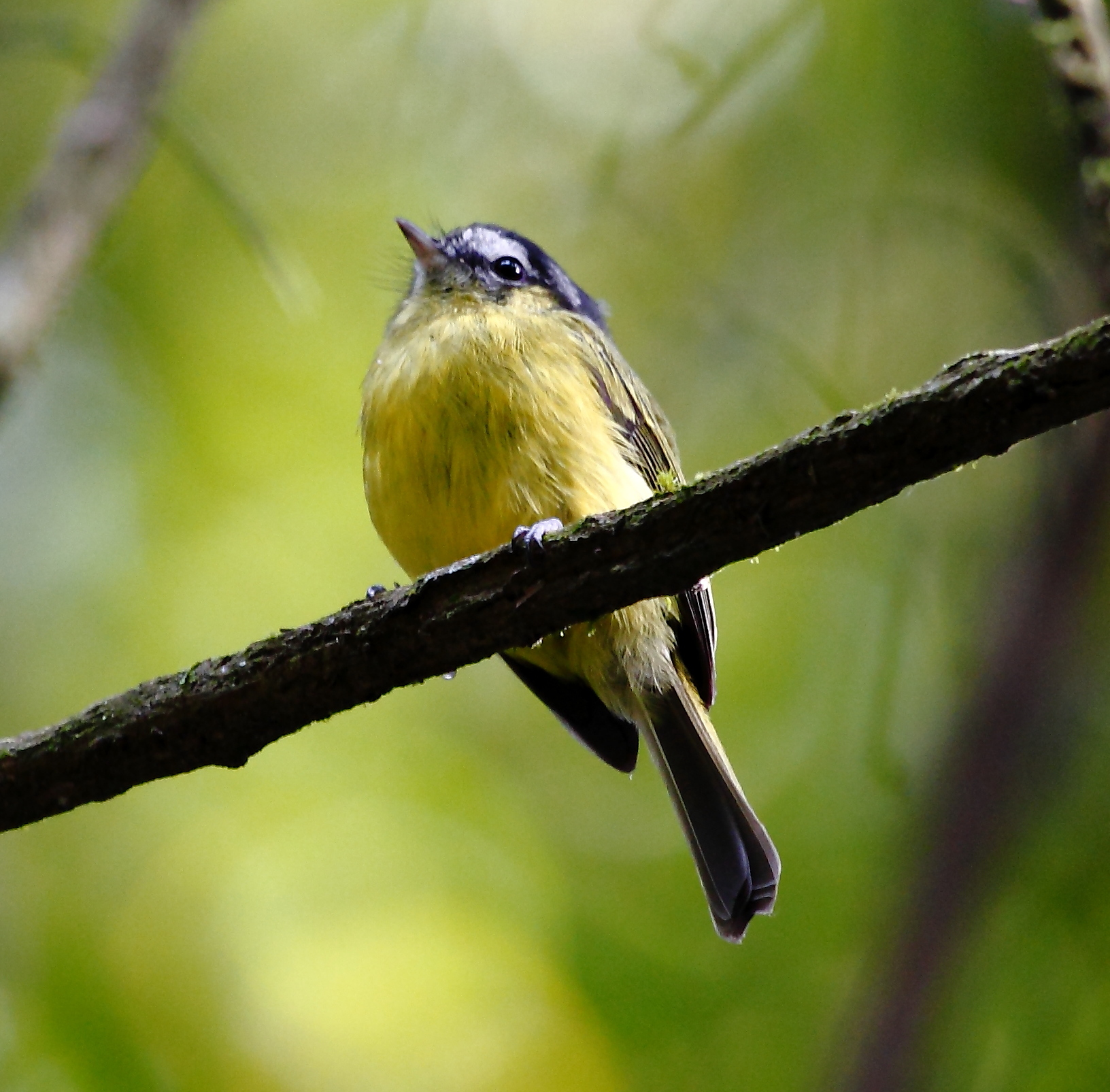

Conservation status
- Least Concern (IUCN 3.1)

Scientific classification
- Kingdom: Animalia
- Phylum: Chordata
- Class: Aves
- Order: Passeriformes
- Family: Tyrannidae
- Genus: Pogonotriccus
- Species: P. eximius

Binomial name
- Pogonotriccus eximius (Temminck, 1822)

Synonyms
- Phylloscartes eximius

= Southern bristle tyrant =

Species of bird

The southern bristle tyrant (Pogonotriccus eximius) is a Least Concern species of passerine bird in the family Tyrannidae, the tyrant flycatchers. It is found in Argentina, Brazil, and Paraguay.

== Taxonomy and systematics ==
The southern bristle tyrant was originally described as Pogonotriccus eximius. The genus Pogonotriccus was later merged into genus Phylloscartes. Beginning in 2016 taxonomic systems resurrected Pogonotriccus for this species and a few others.

The southern bristle tyrant is monotypic.

== Description ==
The southern bristle tyrant measures about 11 to 11.5 cm (4.3 to 4.5 in) in length; one male weighed 7.5 g (0.26 oz). Both sexes share the same plumage. Adults feature a gray crown and nape with an olive tint in the middle of the crown. A wide white streak at the lores narrows and becomes grayer over and past the eye to the nape. Their ear coverts are yellow bisected by a wide black crescent. Their back, rump, and tail are bright olive. Their wings are dusky with yellowish olive edges on the flight feathers and wing coverts. Their chin, throat, and underparts are bright yellow with a light olive wash on the breast. Both sexes have a dark brown or dull red iris, a black maxilla, a pinkish white mandible, and pale gray legs and feet.

== Distribution and habitat ==
The southern bristle tyrant is a bird of the Atlantic Forest. It is found from central Minas Gerais and western Espírito Santo states in Brazil south into northern Rio Grande do Sul and west into eastern Paraguay and extreme northeastern Argentina's Misiones Province. It inhabits the interior and edges of humid forest, especially near watercourses. It tends to frequent the forest's mid-level. Sources differ on its elevational range. The IUCN and van Perlo state an upper limit of 600 m (2,000 ft). The Cornell Lab of Ornithology's Birds of the World places it between about 800 and 1,700 m (2,600 and 5,600 ft) in the northern part of its range and down to 100 m (300 ft) at the far southern edges of it.

== Behavior ==
=== Movement ===
The southern bristle tyrant is a year-round resident.

=== Feeding ===
The southern bristle tyrant's diet has not been detailed but it is known to feed on arthropods. It typically forages in the forest's mid-story, perching upright and making short upward sallies to snatch or hover-glean prey from vegetation. It is usually seen singly or in pairs and frequently joins mixed-species feeding flocks.

=== Breeding ===
The southern bristle tyrant's breeding season has not been fully defined but appears to span at least from July to October. Its nest is a globe with a short entrance tunnel near its top. It is made from live moss held together with spider web, lined with seed floss, and attached to a mossy tree trunk. The clutch is two eggs. The incubation period, time to fledging, and details of parental care are not known.

=== Vocalization ===
The southern bristle tyrant's song is an "extr. high, energetic, strident, rattling 'vrrrrrjeh' trill" lasting one or two seconds.

== Status ==
The IUCN has assessed the southern bristle tyrant as Least Concern. Its population size is not known and is believed to be decreasing. "Agricultural conversion and deforestation for mining and plantation production historically threatened its lowland habitats. Current key threats are urbanisation, industrialisation, agricultural expansion, colonisation and associated road-building." The results of a study published in 2015 "indicated that the Southern Bristle-Tyrant may lose 40% of its potential distribution under scenarios of global warming".
