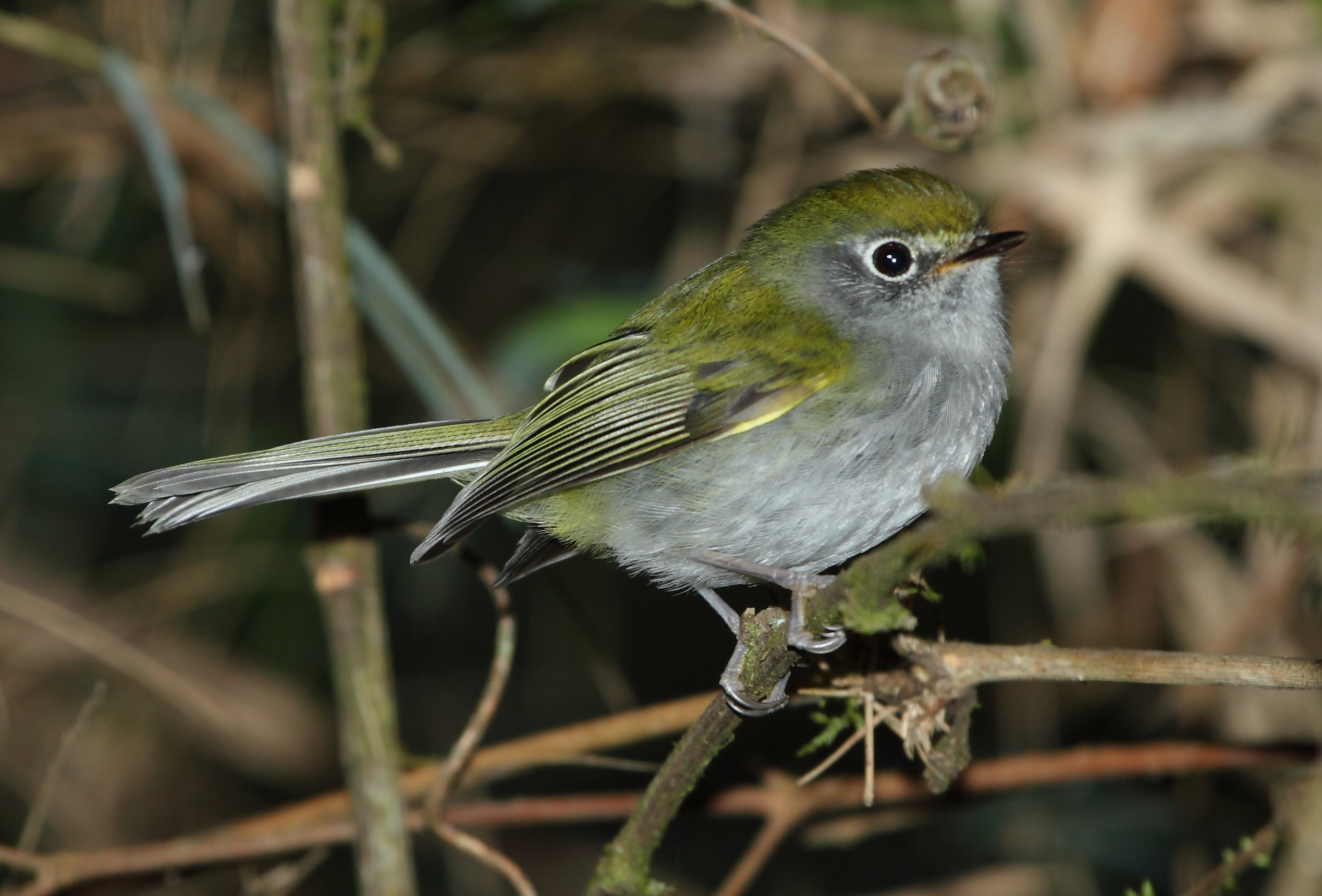

Conservation status
- Least Concern (IUCN 3.1)

Scientific classification
- Kingdom: Animalia
- Phylum: Chordata
- Class: Aves
- Order: Passeriformes
- Family: Tyrannidae
- Genus: Pogonotriccus
- Species: P. difficilis

Binomial name
- Pogonotriccus difficilis (Ihering, HFA & Ihering, R, 1907)

Synonyms
- Guracava difficilis; Phylloscartes difficilis

= Serra do Mar bristle tyrant =

Species of bird

The Serra do Mar bristle tyrant (Pogonotriccus difficilis), or Serra do Mar tyrannulet (Phylloscartes difficilis), is a small species of bird in the tyrant flycatcher family Tyrannidae. It is endemic to Brazil.

== Taxonomy and systematics ==
The Serra do Mar bristle tyrant was formally described in 1907 by the German-Brazilian naturalists Hermann von Ihering and his son Rodolpho von Ihering. They introduced a new genus, Guracava and coined the binomial name Guracava difficilis.The type locality was specified as Itatiaia in the Brazilian state of Rio de Janeiro. The specific epithet is Latin meaning "difficult". The Serra do Mar bristle tyrant was later moved to genus Phylloscartes and known as the Serra do Mar tyrannulet.

A comprehensive molecular phylogenetic study of the suboscines by Mike Harvey and collaborators, published in 2020, found that the then Phylloscartes difficilis was embedded in a clade containing the bristle tyrants in the genus Pogonotriccus. Based on this study, most systems moved the species to the resurrected genus Pogonotriccus and changed its English name from Serra do Mar tyrannulet to Serra do Mar bristle tyrant. However, as of late 2024 BirdLife International's Handbook of the Birds of the World retains the names Serra do Mar tyrannulet and Phylloscartes difficilis.

The Serra do Mar bristle tyrant is monotypic: no subspecies are recognized.

== Description ==
The Serra do Mar bristle tyrant is 11 to 11.5 cm (4.3 to 4.5 in) long and weighs about 7 to 8 g (0.25 to 0.28 oz). The sexes have the same plumage. Adults have a bright olive crown, nape, back, rump, and tail. They have blackish lores whose color extends to under the eye, a white stripe from above the lores to the eye, and a prominent white eye-ring on an otherwise mostly gray face. They have a blackish crescent behind the ear coverts. Their wings are the same olive as the back with slightly paler edges on the flight feathers. Their chin, throat, and underparts are medium gray that is slightly paler on the throat and undertail coverts. Both sexes have a brown iris, a short pointed black bill with a paler base to the mandible, and grayish pink legs and feet.

== Distribution and habitat ==
As its name suggests, it is native to the Serra do Mar coastal forests, from southeastern Minas Gerais and southwestern Espírito Santo states south into northeastern Rio Grande do Sul. It inhabits the interior and edges of humid montane forest. In elevation it ranges between 950 and 2,150 m (3,100 and 7,100 ft).

== Behavior ==
=== Movement ===
The Serra do Mar bristle tyrant is a year-round resident.

=== Feeding ===
The Serra do Mar bristle tyrant feeds on arthropods and to a lesser extent on fruits. It typically forages in the forest's understory, perching upright and making short upward sallies to snatch or hover-glean prey from vegetation. It is usually seen singly or in pairs and rarely as part of a mixed-species feeding flock.

=== Breeding ===
The Serra do Mar bristle tyrant's breeding season is thought to span from September to January. It builds a closed nest of moss with a long tube for an entrance. Both parents provision nestlings. The clutch size, incubation period, time to fledging, and other details of parental care are not known.

=== Vocalization ===
The Serra do Mar bristle tyrant's song is a "very high, sharp yet hoarse, 3-noted 'wé-do-die', so fast that [the] 2nd and 3rd note merge if heard from some distance".

== Status ==
The IUCN originally in 1988 assessed the Serra do Mar bristle tyrant as Near Threatened and since June 2020 as being of Least Concern. Its estimated population of between 20,000 and 50,000 mature individuals is believed to be decreasing. "Its montane forests have suffered less destruction than adjacent lowland areas, but the isolated patches in the north of its range have virtually disappeared owing to the expansion of pasture and cultivation." It is considered uncommon but is found "regularly in Itatiaia National Park".
