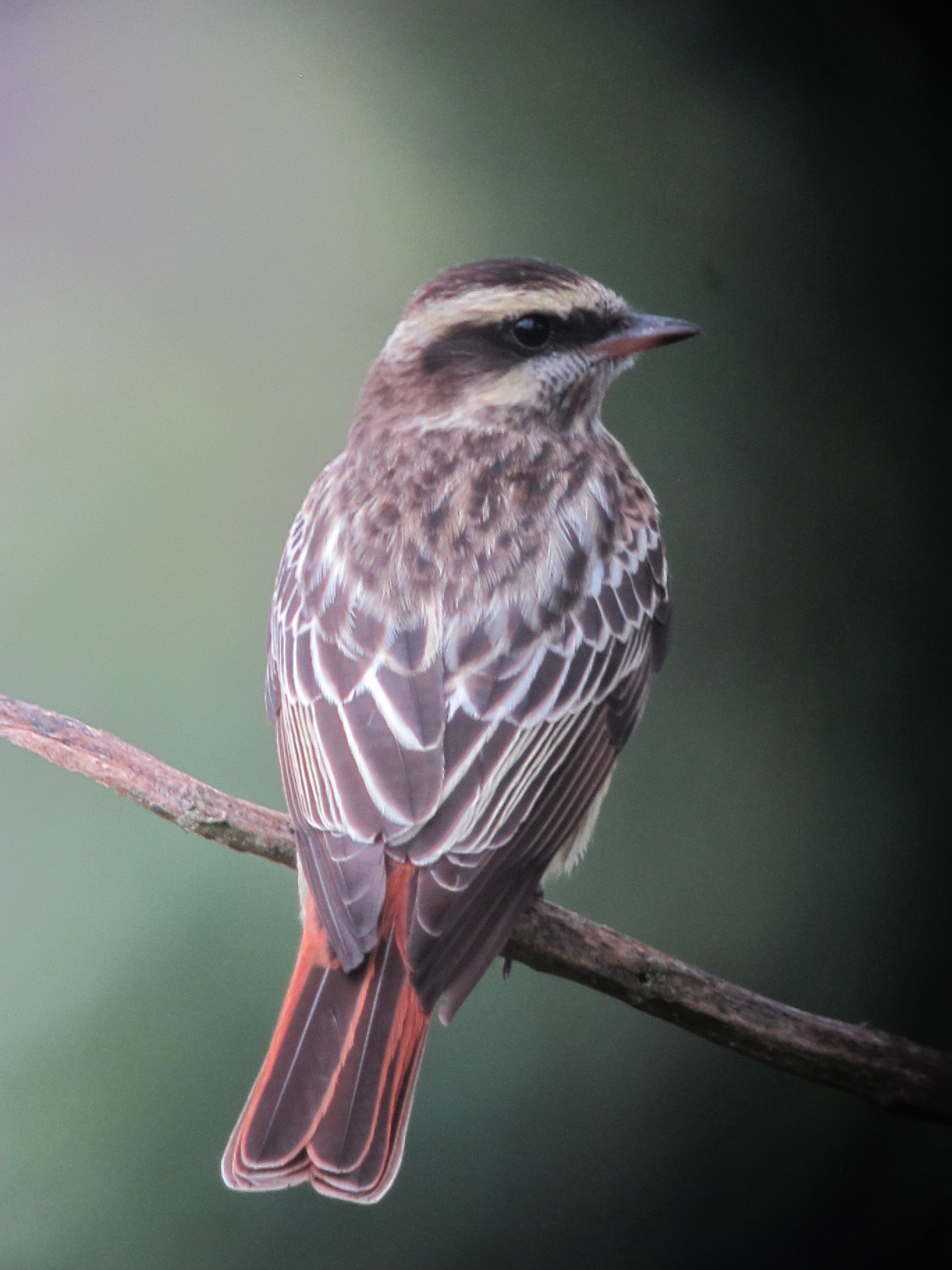
- Variegated flycatcher (Empidonomus varius)

Scientific classification
- Kingdom: Animalia
- Phylum: Chordata
- Class: Aves
- Order: Passeriformes
- Family: Tyrannidae
- Genus: Empidonomus; Cabanis & Heine, 1860

Type species
- Muscicapa varia Vieillot, 1818

= Empidonomus =

Genus of birds

Empidonomus is a genus of small passerine birds in the tyrant flycatcher family Tyrannidae that are found in South America. The genus contains two species.

== Taxonomy ==
The genus Empidonomus was introduced in 1860 by the German ornithologists Jean Cabanis and Ferdinand Heine to accommodate a single species, Muscicapa varia Vieillot, the variegated flycatcher. This is the type species. The genus name combines the Ancient Greek εμπις/empis, εμπιδος/empidos meaning "gnat" or "mosquito" with -νομος/-nomos meaning "-ruling".

The genus contains two species:

Image	Common name	Scientific name	Distribution
	Variegated flycatcher	Empidonomus varius	widespread across South America
	Crowned slaty flycatcher	Empidonomus aurantioatrocristatus	Amazonia, central south, southeast South America
