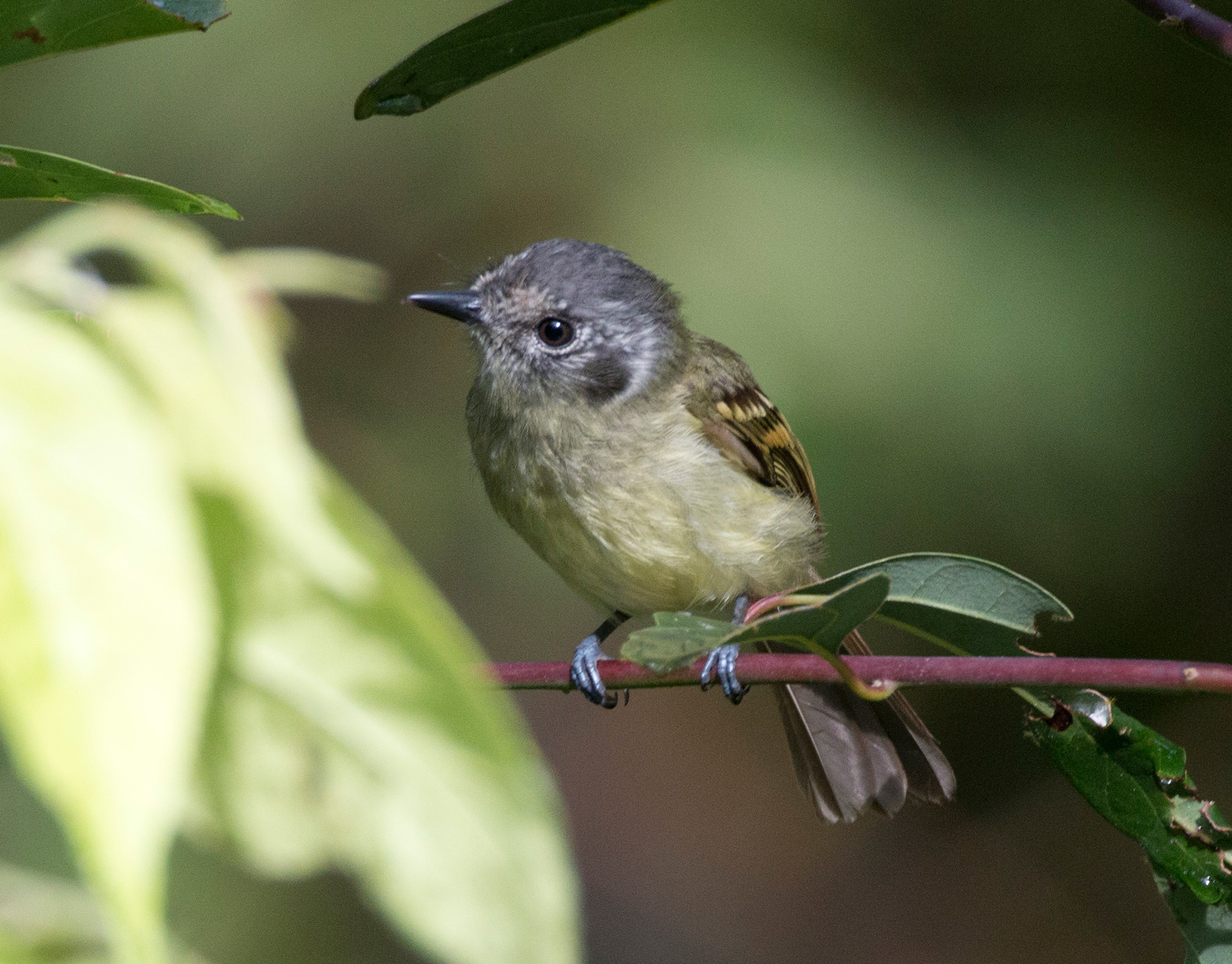
- Marble-faced bristle tyrant (Pogonotriccus ophthalmicus)

Scientific classification
- Kingdom: Animalia
- Phylum: Chordata
- Class: Aves
- Order: Passeriformes
- Family: Tyrannidae
- Genus: Pogonotriccus; Cabanis & Heine, 1860

Type species
- Muscicapa eximius Temminck, 1822

= Pogonotriccus =

Genus of birds

Pogonotriccus is a genus of small passerine birds in the tyrant flycatcher family Tyrannidae. They are found in wooded habitats of Central and South America.

== Taxonomy ==
The genus was erected by the German ornithologists Jean Cabanis and Ferdinand Heine in 1859 with the southern bristle tyrant (Pogonotriccus eximius) as the type species. The genus has sometimes been merged into the genus Phylloscartes. In 2004 John Fitzpatrick in the Handbook of the Birds of the World chose to treat Pogonotriccus as a separate genus based on the slight differences in behaviour of the birds in the two genera. Frank Gill and David Donsker then also recognised Pogonotriccus in the list of bird species that they maintain on behalf of the International Ornithological Committee. The evidence for splitting the genus is weak: a 2009 molecular phylogenetic study that included one species from Pogonotriccus and three from Phylloscartes, found that the genetic differences were small.

== Species ==
The genus contains nine species:

Image	Common name	Scientific name	Distribution
	Variegated bristle tyrant	Pogonotriccus poecilotis	Colombia, Ecuador, Peru, and Venezuela.
	Chapman's bristle tyrant	Pogonotriccus chapmani	Venezuela.
	Marble-faced bristle tyrant	Pogonotriccus ophthalmicus	Bolivia, Colombia, Ecuador, Peru, and Venezuela.
	Spectacled bristle tyrant	Pogonotriccus orbitalis	Bolivia, Colombia, Ecuador, and Peru
	Venezuelan bristle tyrant	Pogonotriccus venezuelanus	Venezuela.
	Antioquia bristle tyrant	Pogonotriccus lanyoni	Colombia.
	Southern bristle tyrant	Pogonotriccus eximius	Brazil, Paraguay and northeastern Argentina.
	Sao Paulo bristle tyrant	Pogonotriccus paulista	
	Serra do Mar bristle tyrant	Pogonotriccus difficilis	
