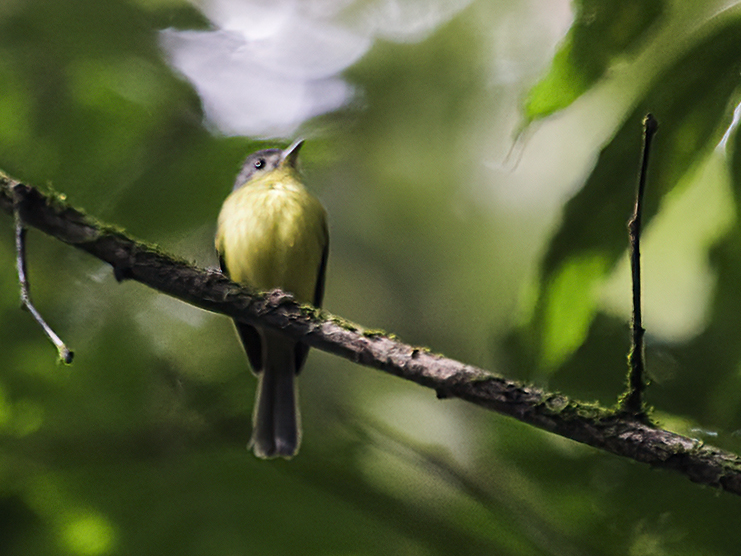

Conservation status
- Vulnerable (IUCN 3.1)

Scientific classification
- Kingdom: Animalia
- Phylum: Chordata
- Class: Aves
- Order: Passeriformes
- Family: Tyrannidae
- Genus: Pogonotriccus
- Species: P. lanyoni

Binomial name
- Pogonotriccus lanyoni (Graves, 1988)

Synonyms
- Phylloscartes lanyoni

= Antioquia bristle tyrant =

Species of bird

The Antioquia bristle tyrant (Pogonotriccus lanyoni) is a Vulnerable species of passerine bird in the family Tyrannidae, the tyrant flycatchers. It is endemic to Colombia.

== Taxonomy and systematics ==
The Antioquia bristle tyrant was originally described as Phylloscartes lanyoni. Beginning in 2016 taxonomic systems resurrected Pogonotriccus for this species and a few others.

The species' common name comes from Antioquia Department, where the type specimen was collected. Its specific epithet honors Wesley E. Lanyon "in recognition of his research on tyrannid species over the last three decades".

The Antioquia bristle tyrant is monotypic.

== Description ==
The Antioquia bristle tyrant is about 11 to 11.5 cm (4.3 to 4.5 in) long. The sexes have the same plumage. Adults have a gray crown with a greenish cast, grizzled gray and white lores, and an indistinct grayish eye-ring. Their ear coverts are yellow with pale gray tips. Their back and rump are bright olive green and their uppertail coverts bright olive yellow. Their tail is dark brownish gray. Their wings are dark brownish gray with bright olive green edges on the flight feathers. Their wing coverts are dark brownish gray with bright yellow tips that show as two wing bars. Their chin, throat, and underparts are bright yellow that is palest on the chin. Both sexes have a brown iris, a brownish black maxilla, a dusky tipped pale mandible, and dark brown legs and feet.

== Distribution and habitat ==
The Antioquia bristle tyrant primarily is found in the lower valleys of the Magdalena and Cauca rivers in central Antioquia, northern Caldas, western Boyacá, and northern Cundinamarca departments. It habitat is not well known but the species is believed to mostly occur in humid evergreen forest. In elevation it ranges between 350 and 800 m (1,100 and 2,600 ft).

== Behavior ==
=== Movement ===
The Antioquia bristle tyrant is believed to be a year-round resident.

=== Feeding ===
The Antioquia bristle tyrant's diet and foraging behavior have not been studied. It is known to feed on insects. It has been observed foraging in the forest's mid-story up into the canopy, making short upward sallies to snatch or hover-glean prey from vegetation and to capture it in mid-air. It is usually seen in pairs or small family groups and is known to join mixed-species feeding flocks.

=== Breeding ===
The Antioquia bristle tyrant's nesting season appears to include March to June. Nothing else is known about the species' breeding biology.

=== Vocalization ===
The Antioquia bristle tyrant's song is "a short stutter, introduced with a chip and ending with several wheezy notes".

== Status ==
The IUCN originally in 1994 assessed the Antioquia bristle tyrant as Endangered, but downlisted the species to Vulnerable in 2024. It has a limited range and its estimated population of between 1000 and 2500 mature individuals is believed to be decreasing. It is primarily threatened from habitat loss due to agriculture and infrastructure development. The species is considered uncommon and local.
