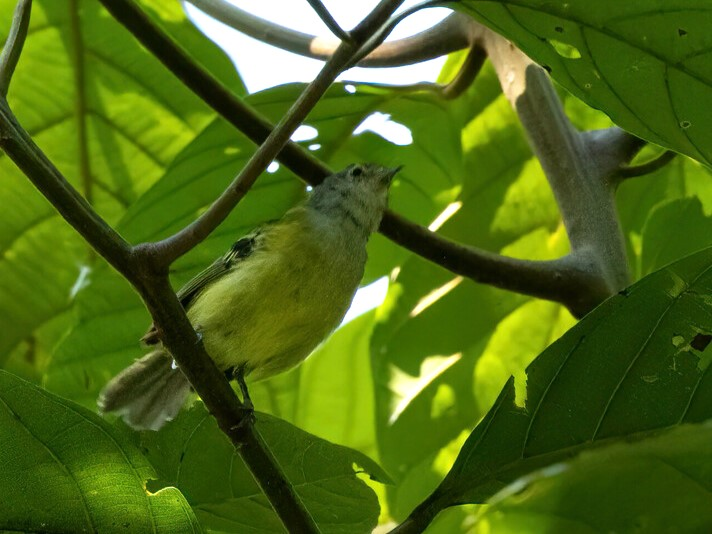

Conservation status
- Least Concern (IUCN 3.1)

Scientific classification
- Kingdom: Animalia
- Phylum: Chordata
- Class: Aves
- Order: Passeriformes
- Family: Tyrannidae
- Genus: Pogonotriccus
- Species: P. orbitalis

Binomial name
- Pogonotriccus orbitalis (Cabanis, 1873)

Synonyms
- Capsiempis orbitalis; Phylloscartes orbitalis

= Spectacled bristle tyrant =

Species of bird

The spectacled bristle tyrant (Pogonotriccus orbitalis) is a species of passerine bird in the family Tyrannidae, the tyrant flycatchers. It is found in Bolivia, Colombia, Ecuador, and Peru.

== Taxonomy and systematics ==
The spectacled bristle tyrant was originally described as Capsiempis orbitalis. It was later moved into genus Pogonotriccus, which was still later merged into genus Phylloscartes. Beginning in 2016 taxonomic systems resurrected Pogonotriccus for this species and a few others.

The spectacled bristle tyrant is monotypic.

== Description ==
The spectacled bristle tyrant is 11 to 11.5 cm (4.3 to 4.5 in) long and weighs about 8 g (0.28 oz). The sexes have the same plumage. Adults have a gray crown, yellowish white lores, and a prominent yellowish white eye-ring on an otherwise mottled yellowish face. Their ear coverts have a blackish crescent at the rear. Their back and rump are olive. Their wings are dusky with pale yellow edges on the flight feathers. Their wing coverts are dusky with pale yellow tips that show as two wing bars. Their tail is olive. Their throat and underparts are bright yellow with a very light olive wash on the breast. Both sexes have a brown iris, a long, pointed, bill with a blackish maxilla and a mostly whitish to pinkish white mandible, and gray legs and feet.

== Distribution and habitat ==
The spectacled bristle tyrant has a disjunct distribution. One population is found from Putumayo Department in far southern Colombia into northern Ecuador as far as Orellana Province. A second is found in far southeastern Ecuador's Zamora-Chinchipe Province and slightly into northern Peru. The third is found on the eastern slope of the Andes from southern Amazonas Department in northern Peru south through the country into Bolivia as far as Cochabamba Department. It inhabits humid montane forest in the foothills and subtropical zone, mostly below the level of cloudforest. It favors dark wet ravines, and typically remains in the forest interior. In elevation it ranges between 700 and 1,200 m (2,300 and 3,900 ft) in Colombia, between 700 and 1,400 m (2,300 and 4,600 ft) in Ecuador, and between 500 and 1,400 m (1,600 and 4,600 ft) in Peru.

== Behavior ==
=== Movement ===
The spectacled bristle tyrant is a year-round resident throughout its range.

=== Feeding ===
The spectacled bristle tyrant feeds on arthropods. It forages in the forest's understory up into the mid-story, typically perching upright and making short upward sallies to snatch or hover-glean prey from vegetation. It usually forages singly and in pairs and sometimes as part of a mixed-species feeding flock.

=== Breeding ===
The spectacled bristle tyrant apparently breeds between September and December in Peru. Nothing else is known about the species' breeding biology.

=== Vocalization ===
What is thought to be the spectacled bristle tyrant's song is "a rising series of high notes" pit-ti TU-TI-TEE". Its calls include "thin pit-tew notes" and "a thin, high, dry, descending trill, rising slightly at end: 'ti'tiiiiiiiiir".

== Status ==
The IUCN has assessed the spectacled bristle tyrant as being of Least Concern. It has a large range; its population size is not known and is believed to be decreasing. No immediate threats have been identified. It is considered local in Colombia, "scarce" in Ecuador, and "uncommon to locally fairly common" in Peru. It occurs in at least two protected areas in Bolivia.
