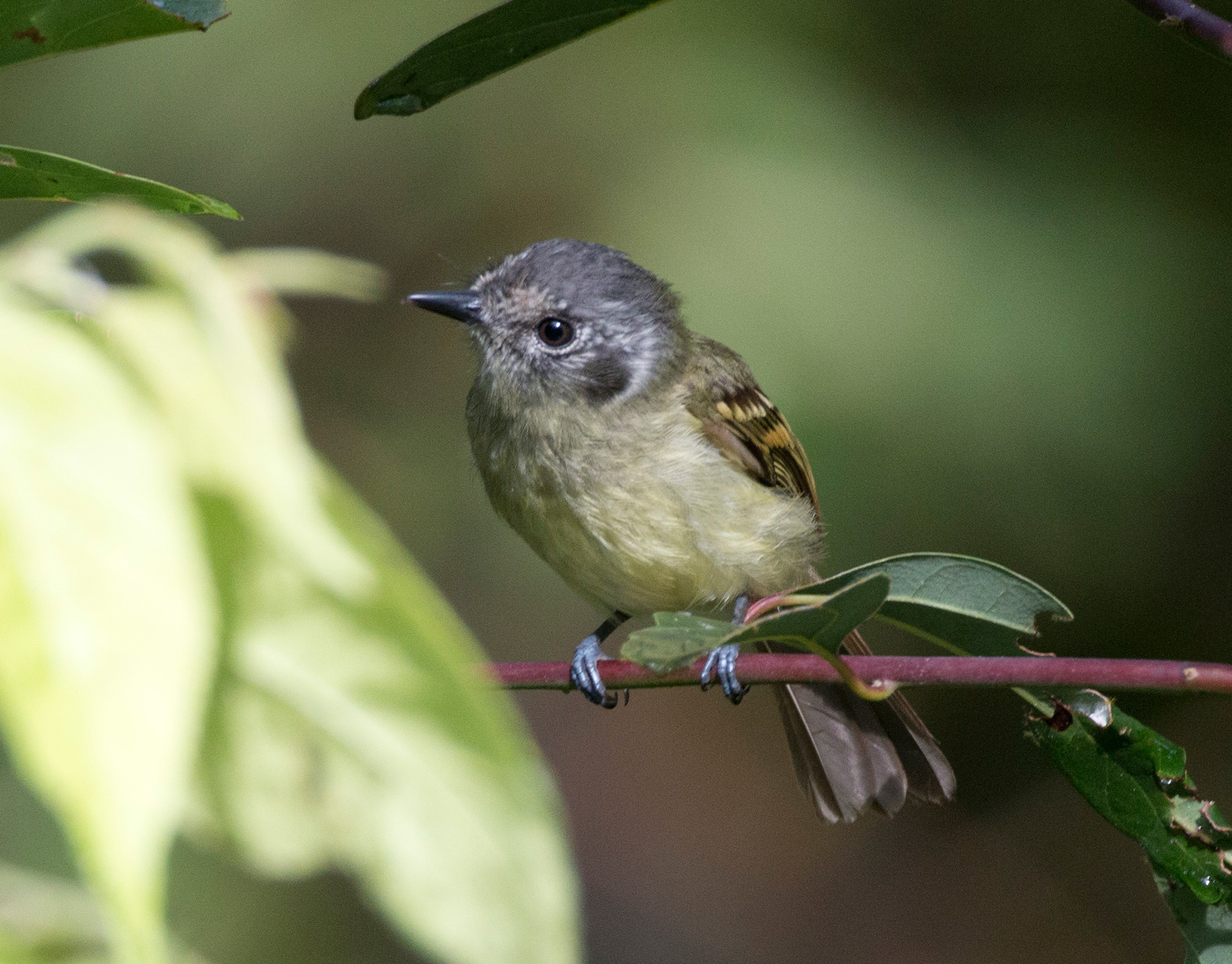
- near Zamora, Ecuador

Conservation status
- Least Concern (IUCN 3.1)

Scientific classification
- Kingdom: Animalia
- Phylum: Chordata
- Class: Aves
- Order: Passeriformes
- Family: Tyrannidae
- Genus: Pogonotriccus
- Species: P. ophthalmicus

Binomial name
- Pogonotriccus ophthalmicus Taczanowski, 1874

Synonyms
- Phylloscartes ophthalmicus

= Marble-faced bristle tyrant =

Species of bird

The marble-faced bristle tyrant (Pogonotriccus ophthalmicus) is a species of passerine bird in the family Tyrannidae, the tyrant flycatchers. It is found in Bolivia, Colombia, Ecuador, Peru, and Venezuela.

== Taxonomy and systematics ==
The marble-faced bristle tyrant was originally described as Pogonotriccus ophthalmicus. That genus was later merged into genus Phylloscartes. Beginning in 2016 taxonomic systems resurrected Pogonotriccus for this species and a few others.

The marble-faced bristle-tyrant has three subspecies, the nominate P. o. ophthalmicus (Taczanowski, 1874), P. o. ottonis (Berlepsch, 1901), and P. o. purus (Todd, 1952). P. o. ottonis had been treated as a separate species by some early authors.

== Description ==
The marble-faced bristle tyrant is about 11.5 to 12 cm (4.5 to 4.7 in) long and weighs 10 to 11 g (0.35 to 0.39 oz). The sexes have the same plumage. Adults of the nominate subspecies have a slate-gray crown, white lores, and a white supercilium on an otherwise gray and white grizzled face. Their ear coverts are white to very pale yellow with a black crescent at the rear. Their back and rump are bright yellow-olive. Their wings are dusky with pale olive-yellow to yellow edges on the flight feathers. Their wing coverts are dusky with pale olive-yellow to yellow tips that show as two wing bars. Their tail is dusky olive. Their throat is grizzled whitish; the rest of their underparts are bright yellow with a heavy darkish olive wash on the breast. Subspecies P. o. ottonis has pale yellow wing bars, a grayish white throat and upper breast with a pale olive wash, and white to very pale yellow lower breast and belly. P. o. purus has a brighter yellow face, more prominent wing bars, and brighter yellow underparts than the nominate. All the subspecies have a brown iris, a black bill with sometimes a paler mandible, and gray legs and feet.

== Distribution and habitat ==
The marble-faced bristle tyrant has a disjunct distribution. Subspecies P. o. purus is the northernmost. It is found in the mountains of Venezuela's Yaracuy and southern Aragua states and in the coastal mountains from Carabobo through Aragua into the Federal District. The nominate subspecies is found in Colombia's Central and Western Andes, on the western slope of the Andes in northwestern Ecuador south to Pichincha Province, on the eastern slope through length of Ecuador slightly into northern Peru, and on the eastern slope in Peru from southern Amazonas Department south to Ayacucho Department. P. o. ottonis is found from Cuzco and Madre de Dios departments in southeastern Peru south into Bolivia as far as Santa Cruz Department.

The marble-faced bristle tyrant inhabits humid montane forest in the subtropical zone. There it favors mid-elevation cloudforest heavy with mosses. It occurs mostly in the forest interior but does venture into clearings and the forest edges. In elevation it occurs between 800 and 1,700 m (2,600 and 5,600 ft) in Venezuela, between 1,000 and 2,400 m (3,300 and 7,900 ft) in Colombia, between 1,200 and 2,100 m (3,900 and 6,900 ft) in Ecuador, and between 750 and 1,800 m (2,500 and 5,900 ft) in Peru.

== Behavior ==
=== Movement ===
The marble-faced bristle tyrant is a year-round resident throughout its range.

=== Feeding ===
The marble-faced bristle tyrant feeds on arthropods. It forages in the forest's mid-story up into the lower canopy, typically perching upright and making short upward sallies to snatch or hover-glean prey from vegetation. It usually forages in pairs, sometimes singly, and usually as part of a mixed-species feeding flock.

=== Breeding ===
The marble-faced bristle-tyrant's breeding season has not been detailed, but includes June in Colombia, October in Ecuador, and at least September to December in Peru. One nest in Ecuador was "a compact mossy ball" with a side entrance. It was attached to moss and vines growing on a tree trunk about 7 m (23 ft) above the ground and contained two eggs. The species' incubation period, time to fledging, and details of parental care are not known.

=== Vocalization ===
The marble-faced bristle tyrant's vocalizations vary somewhat among the subspecies. In Venezuela (P. o. purus) the song is "a bubbly trill...ju-E, pit'pe'e'e'e'e'a'a'a'e'e'e'e'e'e'pit'pit . .ju-E" and its contact call "a brief ju-E!". In Ecuador the nominate sings "a fast psee-ee-ee-ee-u, tsi-tsi-tsi" and its call is "a doubled ts-rt". In Peru P. o. ottonis sings a "series of weak, chippering notes: pit-it-it'it'tu'tu'tu'ti'ti-ti twit twit"; its call is "a high t'tcheep or tu'tchip".

== Status ==
The IUCN has assessed the marble-faced bristle tyrant as being of Least Concern. It has a very large range; its population size is not known and is believed to be decreasing. No immediate threats have been identified. It is considered common in Venezuela and Colombia and "fairly common but local" in Peru. It is found in several protected areas throughout its range.
