= Wesley E. Lanyon =

American ornithologist (1926-2017)

Wesley Edwin "Bud" Lanyon
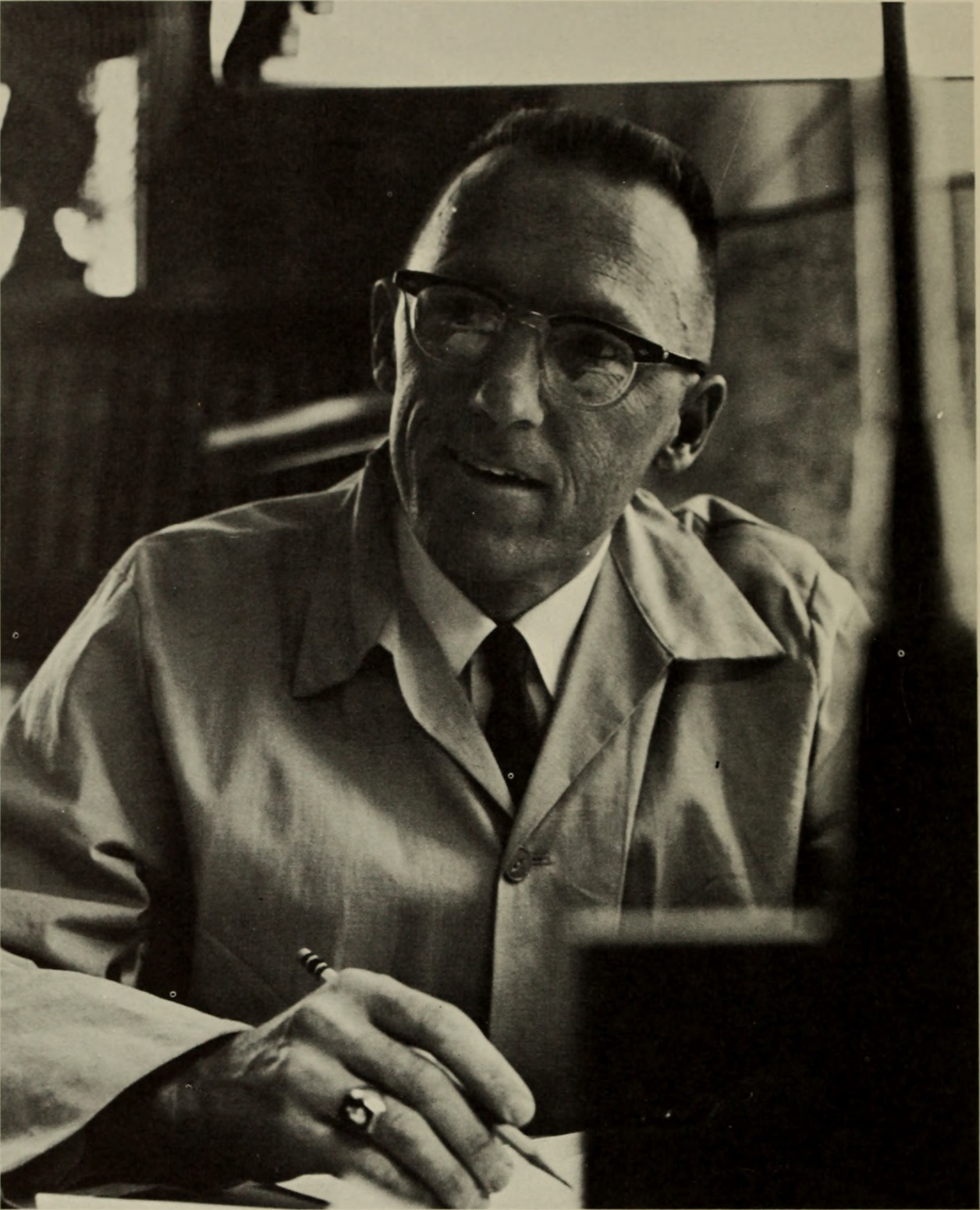
- Wesley E. Lanyon, 1969
- Born: June 10, 1926; Norwalk, Connecticut, US
- Died: June 7, 2017 (aged 90); North Chatham, Massachusetts, US
- Education: Cornell University; University of Wisconsin–Madison
- Known for: Development of techniques for hand-raising songbirds; Pioneering use of sonograms in the study of bird vocalizations
- Awards: Brewster medal (1968)
- Scientific career
- Workplaces: American Museum of Natural History
- Author abbrev. (zoology): Lanyon, W.

Wesley Edwin "Bud" Lanyon (1926–2017) was an American ornithologist.

== Biography ==
Lanyon grew up near Hanover, New Hampshire, where Dartmouth College is located. When he was 13 years old, he met Richard L. Weaver, a naturalist who mentored him in ornithology. After graduation from Hanover High School (where he was president of his senior class), Lanyon served from 1944 to 1946 as a radio operator in the U.S. Navy. In 1950 he graduated from Cornell University, where Donald Griffin, Arthur Augustus Allen, and Peter Paul Kellogg stimulated his interest in recording bird songs. In the summer of 1947 Lanyon met Vernia "Vickie" Elizabeth Hall (1925–2004) when he worked for National Capital Parks in Washington, D.C. There they married in 1951 on January 29 (which was her birthday). In 1950 he became a graduate student at the University of Wisconsin–Madison, where he graduated in 1955 with a PhD. His doctoral dissertation, supervised by John T. Emlen, documented the absence of hybridization between eastern meadowlarks and western meadowlarks and established that the chatter calls of the two distinct species are innate. Lanyon and his wife pioneered the "techniques for hand rearing songbirds, including the use of a novel dietary formula that is still in use."

As a postdoc, Lanyon taught from 1955 to 1956 at the University of Arizona and from 1956 to 1957 at Ohio's Miami University. Accepting an offer from Dean Amadon, he joined in 1957 the ornithology department of the American Museum of Natural History and remained on the staff until his retirement in 1988. From 1958 to 1973 he was the director of the museum's Kalbfleisch Field Research Station. He was chair of the ornithology department from 1973 to 1980 and curator from 1980 to 1988.

He was president of the American Ornithologists' Union (AOU) from 1976 to 1978 and was awarded the AOU's Brewster Medal in 1968. He was the author or coauthor of 102 publications.

Lanyon was predeceased by his wife after 53 years of marriage. Upon his death he was survived by his son Scott, his daughter Cynthia, and four grandchildren. Scott Lanyon became an ornithologist and, at the University of Minnesota, a professor and head of the department of ecology, evolution and behavior, as well as a vice provost and the dean of graduate education. Scott Lanyon was from 2014 to 2016 the last president of the AOU, which was merged in 2016 into the American Ornithological Society. The elder Lanyon and his son were the only father and son pair among the AOU presidents. Cynthia "Cyndy" Lanyon Chandler became an information systems professional in the Woods Hole Oceanographic Institution's Department of Marine Chemistry and Geochemistry.

The American Ornithological Society established the Wesley Lanyon award in his honor. The species Pogonotriccus lanyoni is named in his honor.

== Kalbfleisch Field Research Station ==
Augusta S. Kalbfleisch (1876–1956) and her husband lived at Blyenbeck Farm on Long Island for many years. She enjoyed bird-watching and made her farm attractive to wildlife. Her husband died in 1948. As long ago as 1937 the American Museum of Natural History (AMNH) indicated that the museum's board of directors wanted to use Blyenbeck Farm as a bird and wildlife sanctuary. For that purpose, her last will and testament bequeathed to the AMNH the farm, together with an endowment fund of $200,000. Wesley E. Lanyon was the first and only director of the AMNH's Kalbfleish Field Research Station.

For 20 years the AMNH managed 98.8 acres of rolling woodlands constituting the former Kalbfleisch estate as a research sanctuary with abundant birds, turtles, and snakes. However, in 1979 the AMNH sold the property for subdivision by a real estate developer. A number of people criticized the sale.

== Selected publications ==
- Lanyon, Wesley E. (1956). "Ecological Aspects of the Sympatric Distribution of Meadowlarks in the North-Central States". Ecology. 37 (1): 98–108. doi:10.2307/1929673. JSTOR 1929673.
- Lanyon, Wesley E. (2008). "Territory in the Meadowlarks, Genus Sturnella". Ibis. 98 (3): 485–489. doi:10.1111/j.1474-919X.1956.tb01433.x.
- Lanyon, Wesley E. (1957). The Comparative Biology of the Meadowlarks (Sturnella) in Wisconsin. ISBN 9781877973109.
- Lanyon, Wesley E. (1960). "The Middle American Populations of the Crested Flycatcher Myiarchus tyrannulus". The Condor. 62 (5): 341–350. doi:10.2307/1365164. JSTOR 1365164.
- Lanyon, Wesley E. (1964). Biology of Birds.
- Phillips, Allan R.; Howe, Marshall A.; Lanyon, Wesley E. (1966). "Identification of the Flycatchers of Eastern North America, with Special Emphasis on the Genus Empidonax". Bird-Banding. 37 (3): 153–171. doi:10.2307/4511283. JSTOR 4511283.
- Lanyon, W. E. (1979). "Development of song in the wood thrush (Hylocichla mustelina), with notes on a technique for hand-rearing passerines from the egg". American Museum Novitates (2666). hdl:2246/5423.
- Lanyon, W. E. (1981). "Breeding birds and old field succession on fallow Long Island farmland". Bulletin of the AMNH. 168 (article 1). hdl:2246/1049.
- Lanyon, W. E. (1982). "The Subspecies Concept: Then, Now, and Always". The Auk. 99 (3): 603–604.
- Lanyon, Scott; Lanyon, Wesley E. (1989). "The Systematic Position of the Plantcutters, Phytotoma". The Auk. 106 (3): 422–432.
