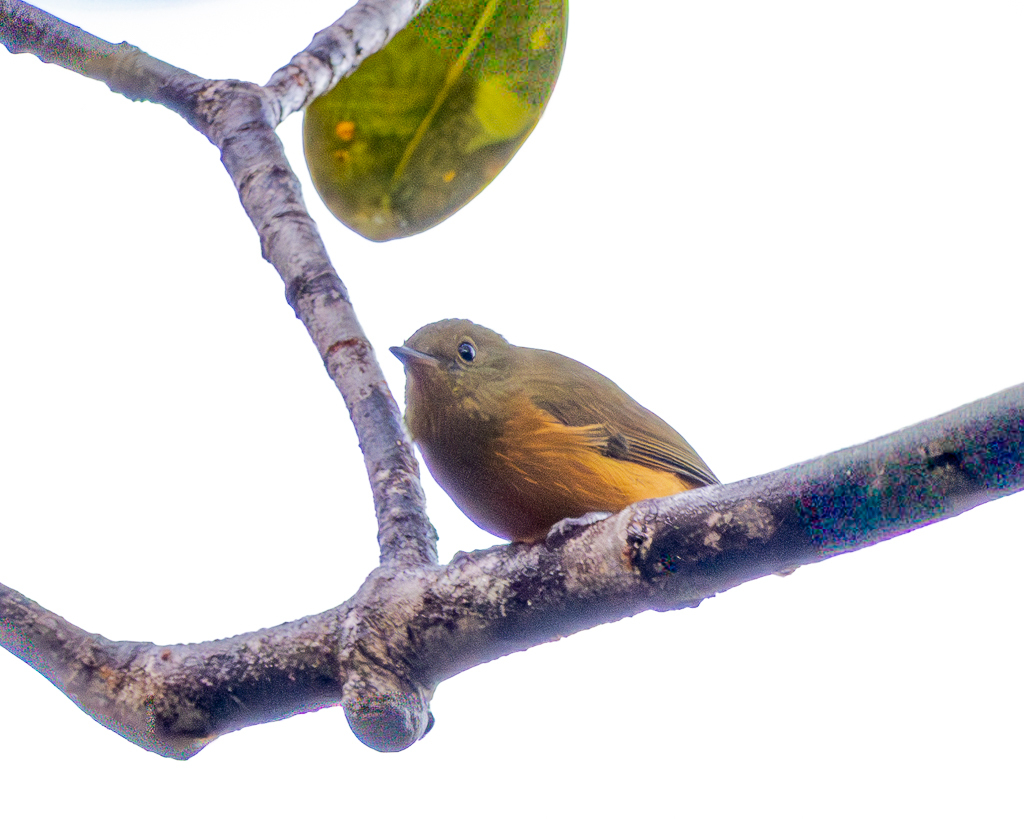

Conservation status
- Least Concern (IUCN 3.1)

Scientific classification
- Kingdom: Animalia
- Phylum: Chordata
- Class: Aves
- Order: Passeriformes
- Family: Tyrannidae
- Genus: Mionectes
- Species: M. roraimae

Binomial name
- Mionectes roraimae (Chubb, C, 1919)

Synonyms
- Pipromorpha oleaginea roraimae

= Sierra de Lema flycatcher =

Species of bird

The Sierra de Lema flycatcher or Tepui flycatcher (Mionectes roraimae) is a species of bird in the tyrant flycatcher family Tyrannidae. It is found in Brazil, Guyana, and Venezuela.

== Taxonomy and systematics ==
The Sierra de Lema flycatcher was described by the English ornithologist Charles Chubb in 1919 as a subspecies of the ochre-bellied flycatcher. He coined the trinomial name Pipromorpha oleaginea roraimae and specified the type location as Mount Roraima in the southeastern corner of Venezuela. The specific epithet roraimae is a Latinized form of Mount Roraima.

The Sierra de Lema flycatcher was reclassified as a subspecies of McConnell's flycatcher (then Pipromorpha macconnelli, now Mionectes macconnelli) by the American ornithologist Clyde Todd in 1921. A study published in 2014 described differences in vocalizations and display behavior between roraimae and macconnelli sensu stricto and suggested that roraimae was a full species. Taxonomic systems began recognizing the split in 2015, though Clements took until 2021 to do so.

The Sierra de Lema flycatcher is monotypic.

== Description ==
The Sierra de Lema flycatcher is 12.5 to 13.5 cm (4.9 to 5.3 in) long and weighs about 13 g (0.46 oz). The sexes have the same plumage. Adults have a bright greenish olive head, nape, back, and rump. Their wings and tail are dusky olive. Their throat and underparts are rich dark cinnamon with a dark grayish olive wash on the throat and upper breast. Both sexes have a dark brown iris, a black bill, and medium gray legs and feet.

== Distribution and habitat ==
The Sierra de Lema flycatcher is found on the foothills and slopes of tepuis where southern and southeastern Venezuela, western Guyana, and northern Brazil meet. It inhabits the interior of humid forest, often in areas with sandy soil or those with rock outcrops and boulders. In elevation it mostly ranges between 700 and 2,000 m (2,300 and 6,600 ft) in Venezuela, though there is one record at about 450 m (1,500 ft). It is known between 350 and 1,800 m (1,100 and 5,900 ft) in Brazil.

== Behavior ==
=== Movement ===
The Sierra de Lema flycatcher is a year-round resident.

=== Feeding ===
The Sierra de Lema flycatcher feeds on a variety of fruits and arthropods. It forages from near the ground up to about 25 m (80 ft) above it. It hover-gleans fruit and insects in short sallies from a perch. It regularly joins mixed-species feeding flocks.

=== Breeding ===
The Sierra de Lema flycatcher is believed to breed between January and March. Nothing else is known about the species' breeding biology, though it is thought to be similar to that of McConnell's flycatcher, which see here.

=== Vocalization ===
As of late 2024 xeno-canto had only two recordings of Sierra de Lema flycatcher vocalizations; the Cornell Lab of Ornithology's Macaulay Library had 16. The species has a "chatter song", a "series of unmelodious modulated notes, which sounds like a jumbled chatter...typically introduced by short single chup notes, and suddenly shifts to a loud jangle of c.10–15 notes". Its "twangy song" is a "peculiar nasal phrase starting with a low-pitched drawnout vibrating note immediately followed by a much higher-pitched rising trill trrrrraaa-rrreeeee".

== Status ==
The IUCN has assessed the Sierra de Lema flycatcher as being of Least Concern. Its population size is not known and is believed to be decreasing. No immediate threats have been identified. It is considered uncommon to fairly common in Venezuela. It is "[n]ot considered to be threatened by habitat loss, as few roads penetrate its distributional range and human population is small".
