= Patrick Cooney (disambiguation) =

Patrick Cooney (1931–2025) was an Irish politician and government minister.

Patrick Cooney may also refer to:

- Patrick H. Cooney (1845–1915), American attorney
- Patrick R. Cooney (1934–2012), American Roman Catholic prelate
