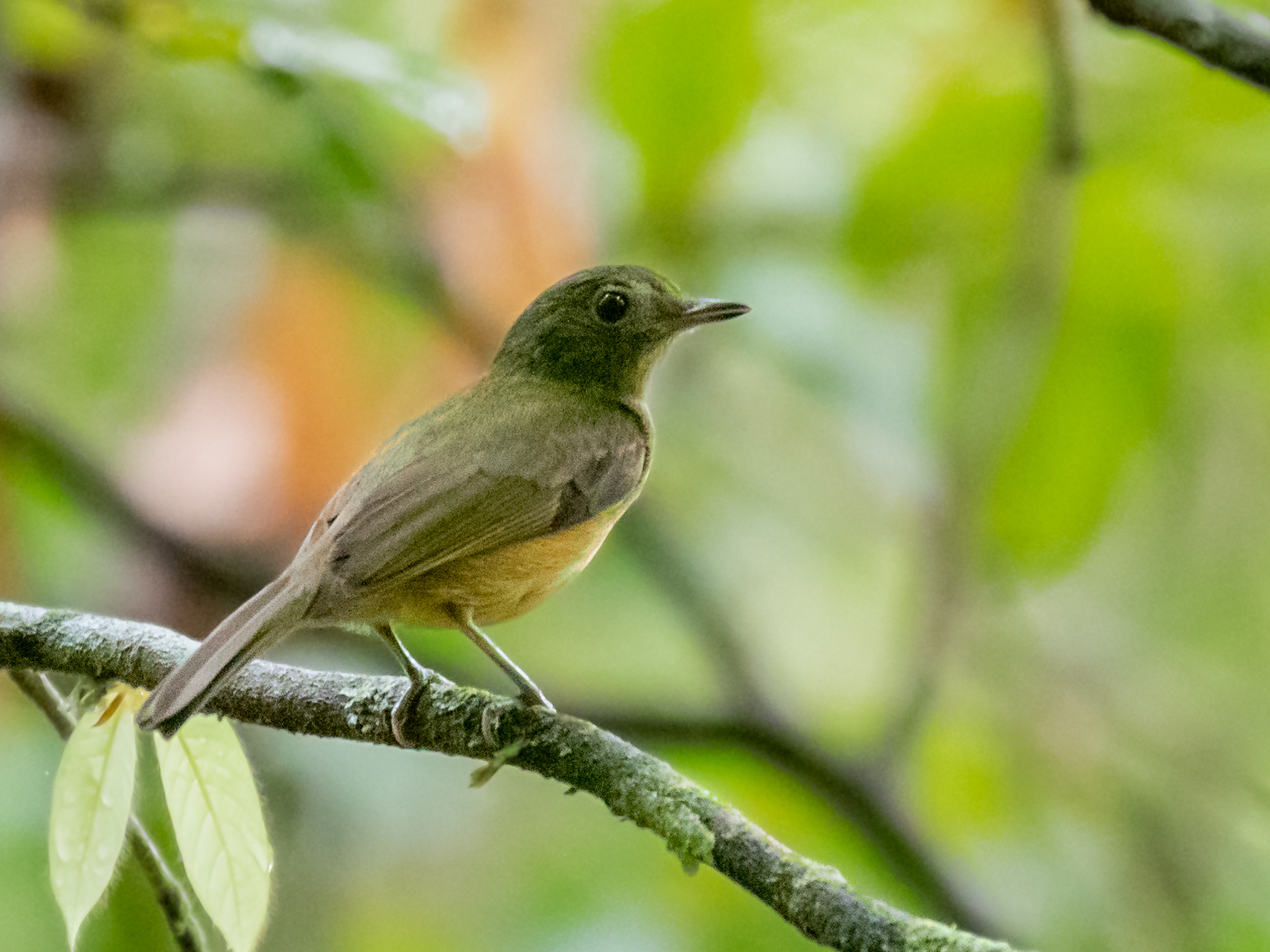

Conservation status
- Least Concern (IUCN 3.1)

Scientific classification
- Kingdom: Animalia
- Phylum: Chordata
- Class: Aves
- Order: Passeriformes
- Family: Tyrannidae
- Genus: Mionectes
- Species: M. macconnelli

Binomial name
- Mionectes macconnelli (Chubb, C, 1919)

Synonyms
- Pipromorpha oleaginea macconnelli

= McConnell's flycatcher =

Species of bird

McConnell's flycatcher (Mionectes macconnelli) is a species of bird in the tyrant flycatcher family Tyrannidae. It is found in Bolivia, Brazil, French Guiana, Guyana, Peru, Suriname, and Venezuela.

== Taxonomy and systematics ==
McConnell's flycatcher was described by the English ornithologist Charles Chubb in 1919 as a subspecies of the ochre-bellied flycatcher. He coined the trinomial name Pipromorpha oleaginea macconnelli and specified the type location as the Kamakabra River in British Guiana. The name macconnelli was chosen to honor the memory of Frederick Vavasour McConnell (1868-1914), an English traveller and collector. It was treated as a separate species by the American ornithologist Clyde Todd in 1921, and was placed in the genus Mionectes by Melvin Traylor in Volume 8 of the Check-list of Birds of the World published in 1979.

The further taxonomy of McConnell's flycatcher is unsettled. The International Ornithological Committee (IOC) and BirdLife International's Handbook of the Birds of the World assign it two subspecies, the nominate M. m. macconnelli (Chubb, C, 1919) and M. m. peruanus (Carriker, 1930). The Clements taxonomy adds a third subspecies, M. m. amazonas. Clements tentatively groups amazonas with peruanus but the IOC includes it within the nominate. In addition, a study published in 2008 suggested that peruanus should be treated as a separate species.

What is now the Sierra de Lema flycatcher (Mionectes roraimae) was long treated as a subspecies of McConnell's flycatcher. The two species have similar plumage but differ in their vocalizations and display behavior. Following a study published in 2014, taxonomic systems began recognizing the split in 2015, though Clements took until 2021 to do so.

== Description ==
McConnell's flycatcher is 12.5 to 14 cm (4.9 to 5.5 in) long and weighs 8 to 18 g (0.28 to 0.63 oz). The sexes have the same plumage. Adults of the nominate subspecies have an olive head, nape, back, and rump. Their wings and tail are dusky olive. Their throat and underparts are rich cinnamon buff with a dark grayish olive wash on the throat and upper breast. Subspecies M. m. peruanus has brighter olive upperparts than the nominate, with an ochraceous tinge to them. Their wing's greater coverts have cinnamon edges. Their underparts are buffy orange with a light olive tinge on the chin and throat. Both sexes of both subspecies have a dark brown iris, a dark brownish gray to black bill with sometimes a pale pinkish base to the mandible, and medium brownish gray legs and feet.

== Distribution and habitat ==
There is some confusion about the distribution of McConnell's flycatcher. All sources agree that it has a disjunct distribution. The IOC places the nominate subspecies in eastern Venezuela, the Guianas, northern and central Brazil, and northeastern Bolivia. It places M. m. peruanus solely in Peru. Clements places the nominate in eastern Venezuela, the Guianas, and northeastern Brazil north of the Amazon River. It places peruanus in Peru and adjacent southwestern Brazil and amazonus in Bolivia. Clements further states that "it is unclear whether populations of east-central Brazil south of the Amazon refer to amazonas (as these historically have been identified), or to the geographically adjacent nominate macconnelli". BirdLife International's map shows a northern population that corresponds to the IOC distribution there. The map shows a second population in Peru, Bolivia, and adjacent Brazil that corresponds with Clements' peruanus plus amazonas. The BLI account does not include subspecies.

McConnell's flycatcher inhabits humid forest in the lowlands and foothills. It primarily occurs in terra firme forest but also in várzea, secondary forest, and plantations. In Brazil and Venezuela it is solely in the lowlands below 500 m (1,600 ft). It reaches elevations of 1,200 m (3,900 ft) in Peru and 2,400 m (7,900 ft) in Bolivia.

== Behavior ==
=== Movement ===
McConnell's flycatcher is believed to be a year-round resident.

=== Feeding ===
McConnell's flycatcher feeds on a variety of fruits and arthropods. It forages from near the ground up to about 25 m (80 ft) above it. It hover-gleans fruit and insects in short sallies from a perch. It regularly joins mixed-species feeding flocks.

=== Breeding ===
The breeding season of McConnell's flycatcher has not been fully defined. It spans from October to April and possibly beyond in northern Brazil, thoughmostly between January and March, and at least from August to November in southeastern Peru. Males display at leks, though the individuals might be well separated. There they perch 1 to 2 m (3 to 7 ft) above the ground and sing, and from the perch make short fluttery display flights. Their nest is a ball made from plant fibers and leaves with a short side entrance tunnel. It is typically suspended from a vine or the end of a branch 1 to 1.5 m (3 to 5 ft) above a pool of water or a small stream. The clutch is three eggs. The incubation period is about 19 days and fledging occurs 17 to 20 days after hatch. Females are believed to tend the nest alone.

=== Vocalization ===
Ornithologists have defined three groups of vocalizations by McConnell's flycatcher. North of the Amazon it makes a "raspy song", a "series of unmelodious raspy to buzzy notes rreh-rreh-rreh-rreh-rreh" and a "twangy song", a "peculiar low-pitched nasal phrase initiated by a single descending note and followed by a trilled series of notes tyang!-tininininininininin". South of the Amazon its raspy song is "grree-grree-grree-grree-grree-grree" and its twangy song "tyang!-trrrrrrrrrrrrrr". The very different song of M. m. peruanus (including M. m. amazonas) is a "series of well-spaced quiet, modulated trrr notes followed by a single louder, nasal querulous teeola".

== Status ==
The IUCN has assessed McConnell's flycatcher as being of Least Concern. It has a very large range; its population size is not known and is believed to be decreasing. No immediate threats have been identified. It is considered uncommon to fairly common in Venezuela and local in Peru. It occurs in many national parks and other protected areas. "Much of this species' habitat remains in good condition; nevertheless, recent research demonstrates that is highly sensitive to disturbance and numbers decline dramatically in forest that has been opened up by, for example, fire."
