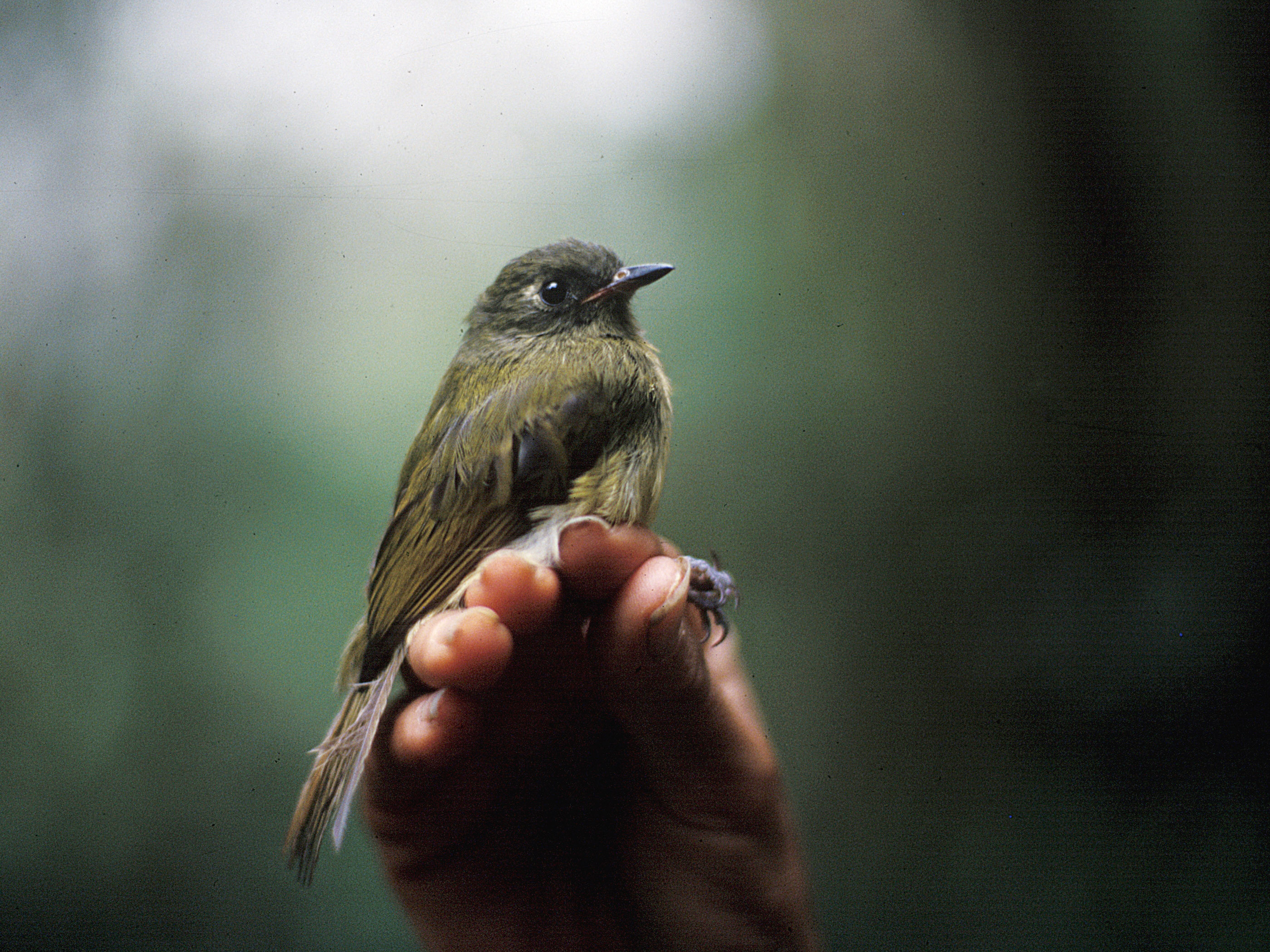

Conservation status
- Least Concern (IUCN 3.1)

Scientific classification
- Kingdom: Animalia
- Phylum: Chordata
- Class: Aves
- Order: Passeriformes
- Family: Tyrannidae
- Genus: Mionectes
- Species: M. striaticollis

Binomial name
- Mionectes striaticollis (d'Orbigny & Lafresnaye, 1837)

= Streak-necked flycatcher =

Species of bird

The streak-necked flycatcher (Mionectes striaticollis) is a species of bird in the family Tyrannidae, the tyrant flycatchers. It is found in Bolivia, Colombia, Ecuador, and Peru.

== Taxonomy and systematics ==
The streak-necked flycatcher has these four subspecies:

- M. s. columbianus Chapman, 1919
- M. s. viridiceps Chapman, 1924
- M. s. palamblae Chapman, 1927
- M. s. striaticollis (d'Orbigny & Lafresnaye, 1837)

Subspecies M. s. palamblae and M. s. striaticollis apparently differ in their vocalizations, so more than one species might be represented.

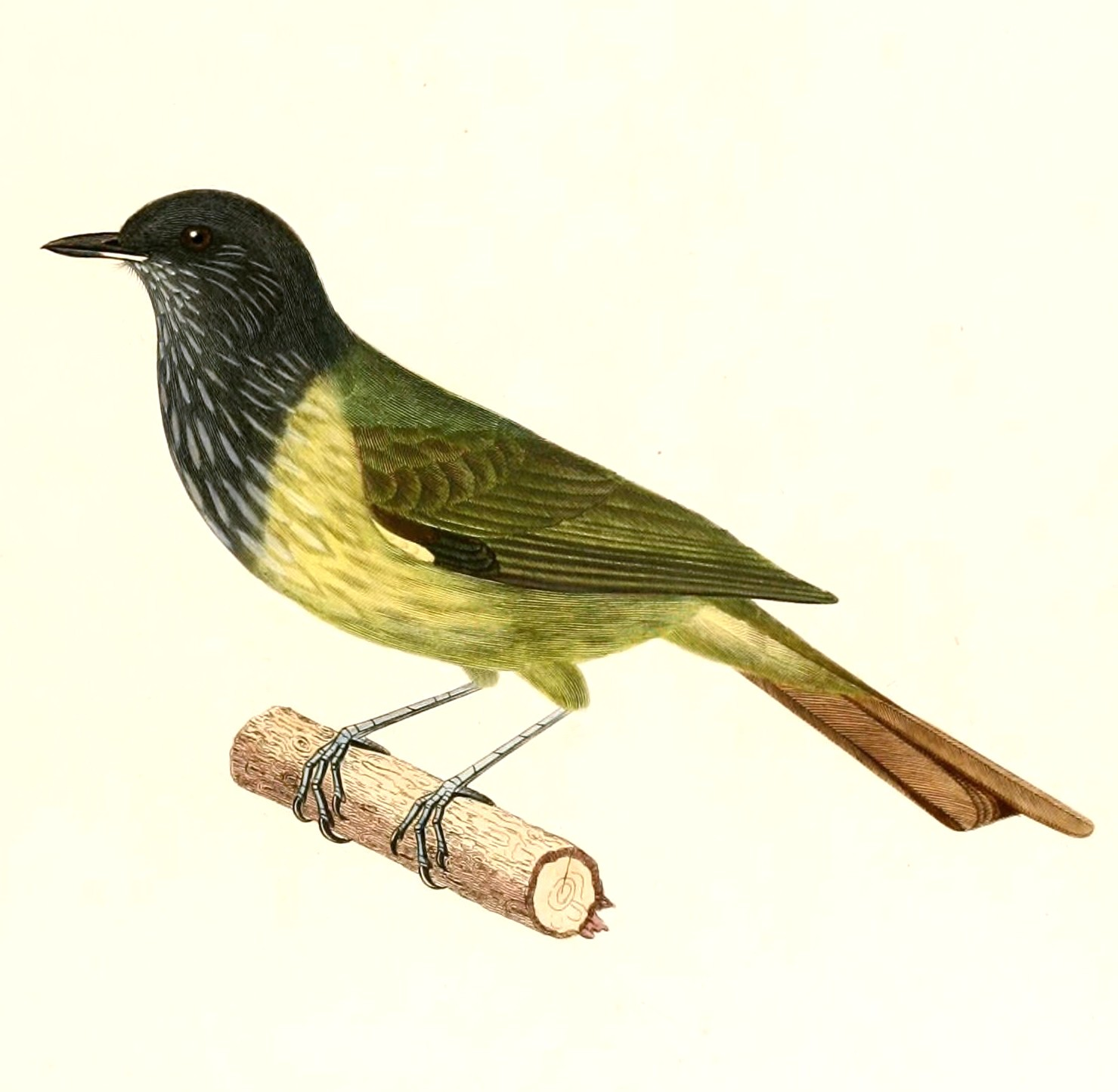
Mionectes striaticollis

== Description ==
The streak-necked flycatcher is 13 to 13.5 cm (5.1 to 5.3 in) long and weighs 13 to 17 g (0.46 to 0.60 oz). The sexes have the same plumage. Adults of the nominate subspecies M. s. striaticollis have a dark gray face with white streaks and a small white spot behind the eye. Their crown and nape are slaty gray and the rest of their upperparts are dark olive. Their wings and tail are olive, sometimes with faint buffish olive wing bars. Their throat and upper breast are slate-gray with white streaks. Their lower breast and flanks are streaked with dark olive and yellow and their belly is yellow.

Subspecies M. s. columbianus has a dark olive-gray crown, a grayish olive face, and a gray throat and upper breast with thin white streaks. M. s. palamblae has an olive wash on the gray face and crown and a gray chin. Its throat and upper breast are streaked dark olive and yellow and its lower breast and belly are yellow. M. s. viridiceps has a dark olive crown, a dark gray face, and an olive throat and upper breast with thin white streaks. Both sexes of all subspecies have a dark brown iris, a long dark brownish gray bill with a pinkish base to the mandible, and dark gray legs and feet.

== Distribution and habitat ==
The subspecies of the streak-necked flycatcher are found thus:

- M. s. columbianus: Colombian Andes except in the southwest; eastern Andean slope of Ecuador
- M. s. viridiceps: west slope of the Andes in far southwestern Colombia and south on the west slope through Ecuador
- M. s. palamblae: west slope of the Andes of northern Peru from near the Ecuadorian border south to Huánuco Department
- M. s. striaticollis east slope of the Andes of Peru from Pasco Department south into northern Bolivia as far as western Santa Cruz Department

The streak-necked flycatcher primarily inhabits humid montane forest in the upper tropical and lower temperate zones. It also occurs at the forest edges and in secondary forest. In elevation it ranges between 1,500 and 2,700 m (4,900 and 8,900 ft) in Colombia, mostly between 1,500 and 2,500 m (4,900 and 8,200 ft) but locally lower in Ecuador, between 1,700 and 3,100 m (5,600 and 10,200 ft) on the west slope in Peru, and between 500 and 3,300 m (1,600 and 10,800 ft) though mostly between 1,000 and 2,400 m (3,300 and 7,900 ft) on the east slope in Peru.

== Behavior ==
=== Movement ===
The streak-necked flycatcher is a year-round resident.

=== Feeding ===
The streak-necked flycatcher feeds on insects and small fruits. It forages in bushes, thickets, and trees from the forest's understory to its sub-canopy. It typically perches upright on a branch and makes short sallies to hover-glean prey from leaves and twigs. It also sometimes takes flying prey on the wing. It typically forages singly and occasionally joins a mixed-species feeding flock.

=== Breeding ===
The streak-necked flycatcher's breeding season has not been fully defined, but includes January to April in Colombia and September to December in southern Peru. Up to six males display to females at a lek; they sing and swing their head in synchrony with the song. The species' nest is a hanging bag with a side entrance made from plant fibers and moss lined with seed down and dry moss. Strands of the outer matrix often dangle below the bag. The nest is typically hung from a vine or twig between about 0.8 and 3 m (3 and 10 ft) above the ground and often near a watercourse. The clutch is two or three eggs. The incubation period is about 19 days and fledging occurs about 18 days after hatch.

=== Vocalization ===
The streak-necked flycatcher apparently sings almost solely at the lek. Its song is variously described as "a series of rhythmic, squeaky notes" and as "a melancholy, squeaky, rising-falling note" urrEEew".

== Status ==
The IUCN has assessed the streak-necked flycatcher as being of Least Concern. It has a large range; its population size is not known and is believed to be decreasing. No immediate threats have been identified. It is considered "widespread" in Peru, "common" in Colombia, and "fairly common but inconspicuous" in Ecuador. It occurs in protected areas throughout its range.
