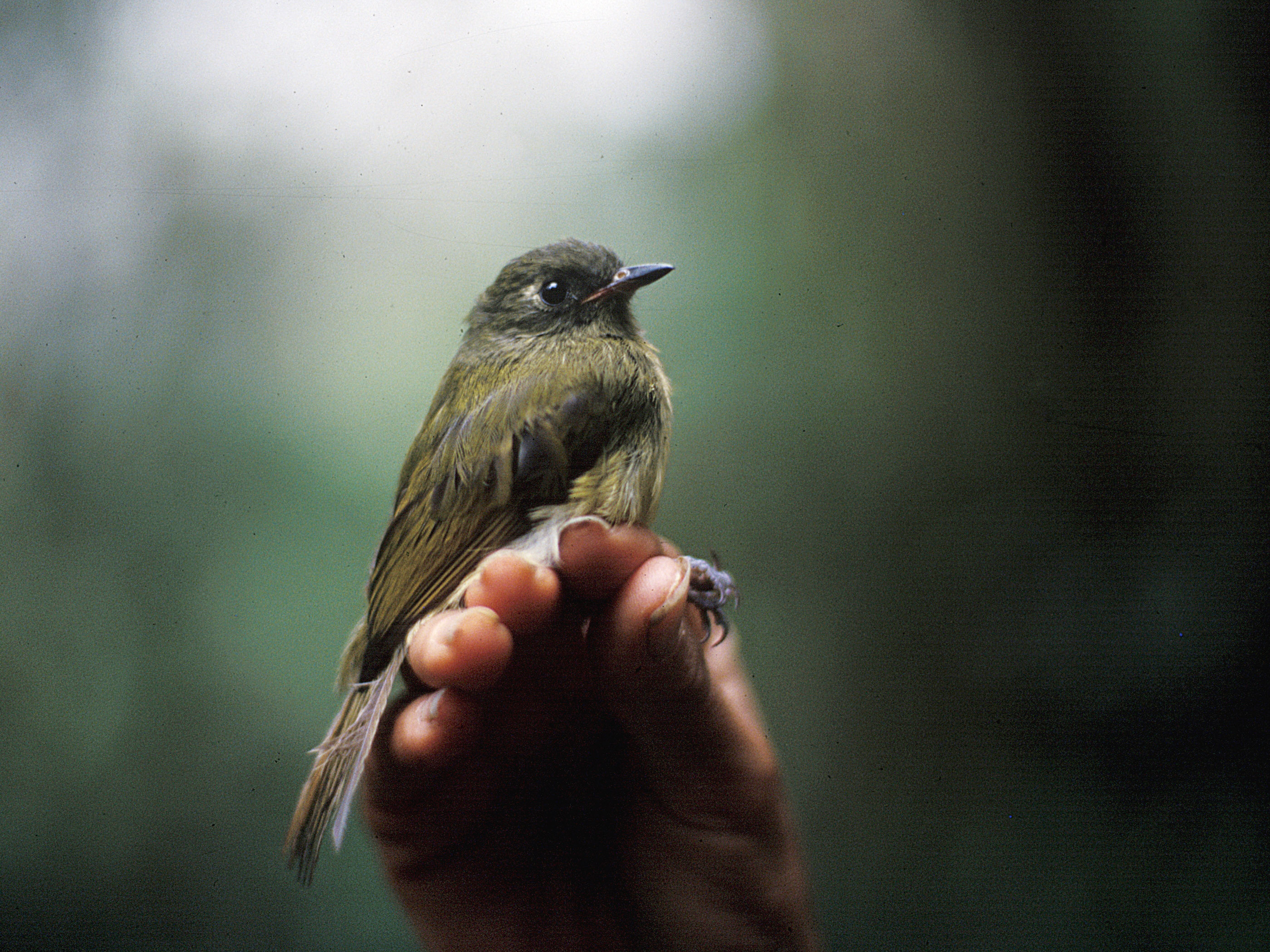
- Streak-necked flycatcher (Mionectes striaticollis)

Scientific classification
- Kingdom: Animalia
- Phylum: Chordata
- Class: Aves
- Order: Passeriformes
- Family: Tyrannidae
- Genus: Mionectes; Cabanis, 1844

Type species
- Mionectes striaticollis

= Mionectes =

Genus of birds

Mionectes is a genus of birds in the tyrant flycatcher family Tyrannidae.

The genus was erected in 1844 by the German ornithologist Jean Cabanis with the streak-necked flycatcher (Mionectes striaticollis) as the type species.

== Species ==
The genus contains the following seven species:

Image	Common name	Scientific name	Distribution
	Streak-necked flycatcher	Mionectes striaticollis	Bolivia, Colombia, Ecuador, and Peru.
	Olive-striped flycatcher	Mionectes galbinus	Bolivia, Colombia, Ecuador, Panama, Peru, Trinidad and Tobago, and Venezuela.
	Olive-streaked flycatcher	Mionectes olivaceus	Costa Rica and Panama.
	Ochre-bellied flycatcher	Mionectes oleagineus	southern Mexico through Central America, and South America east of the Andes as far as southern Brazil, and on Trinidad and Tobago.
	McConnell's flycatcher	Mionectes macconnelli	Guiana Shield, northern Brazil, Peru and Bolivia.
	Sierra de Lema flycatcher	Mionectes roraimae	southern Venezuela and the neighbouring parts of Brazil and Guiana.
	Grey-hooded flycatcher	Mionectes rufiventris	Argentina, Brazil, and Paraguay.

The Tepui flycatcher was formerly considered conspecific with McConnell's flycatcher. The two species have similar plumage but differ in their vocalisation and display behaviour.
