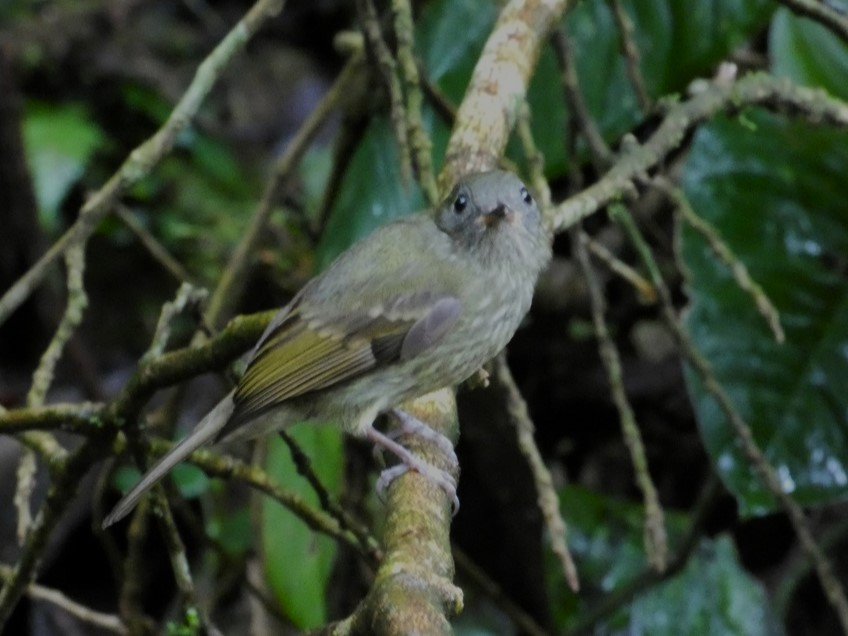

Conservation status
- Least Concern (IUCN 3.1)

Scientific classification
- Kingdom: Animalia
- Phylum: Chordata
- Class: Aves
- Order: Passeriformes
- Family: Tyrannidae
- Genus: Mionectes
- Species: M. olivaceus

Binomial name
- Mionectes olivaceus Lawrence, 1868

= Olive-streaked flycatcher =

Species of bird

The olive-streaked flycatcher (Mionectes olivaceus) is a species of bird in the family Tyrannidae, the tyrant flycatchers. It is found in Costa Rica and Panama.

== Taxonomy and systematics ==
The four subspecies of what is now the olive-striped flycatcher (Mionnectes galbinus) were previously treated as subspecies of what is now the olive-streaked flycatcher. (Confusingly, the original unsplit species was called the olive-striped flycatcher but bore the present olive-streaked flycatcher's binomial Mionectes olivaceus.) Based primarily on vocal differences the species were separated by taxonomic systems beginning in 2016, leaving the olive-streaked flycatcher as a monotypic species. However, as of late 2024, the North American and South American Classification Committees of the American Ornithological Society have not agreed to the split. They retain the olive-striped flycatcher/Mionectes olivaceus names.

This article follows the monotypic species model.

== Description ==
The olive-streaked flycatcher is 13 cm (5.1 in) long. The sexes have the same plumage. Adults have a dark olive face with white streaks and a small triangular white spot behind the eye. Their crown and nape are dark olive and the rest of their upperparts are warm yellow green. Their wings and tail are dusky olive. Their throat and upper breast have dense dark olive and yellowish white streaking with thinner white streaks. Their lower breast and flanks are streaked with dark olive and yellow and their belly is unstreaked yellow. Both sexes have a dark brown iris, a dark brownish gray or black bill with usually a paler base to the mandible, and dark gray or pinkish legs and feet.

== Distribution and habitat ==
The olive-streaked flycatcher is found through much of the highlands of Costa Rica and into western Panama. It inhabits the interior and edges of humid to wet forest, secondary forest, and plantations in the lower subtropical zone. It favors areas with dense shady and moist undergrowth such as is found in ravines. In Costa Rica it mostly occurs at elevations between 800 and 2,200 m (2,600 and 7,200 ft) though some individuals on the Caribbean slope move to as low as 50 m (160 ft) in the non-breeding season. In Panama it mostly occurs between 500 and 1,600 m (1,600 and 5,200 ft) but there are records as high as 3,000 m (9,800 ft).

== Behavior ==
=== Movement ===
The olive-streaked flycatcher is believed to be mostly a year-round resident but is known to make elevational movements on the Caribbean side of Costa Rica.

=== Feeding ===
The olive-streaked flycatcher feeds mostly on fruits but also includes insects in its diet. It forages from the forest understory to its middle level, especially in dense vegetation. It hover-gleans fruit in short sallies from a perch and also picks some while perched. It usually forages by itself and only occasionally joins a mixed-species feeding flock. It has been observed following army ant swarms, apparently to capture insects disturbed by the ants.

=== Breeding ===
The olive-streaked flycatcher's breeding season has not been fully defined but includes April to July in Costa Rica. It makes a pear-shaped nest with a side entrance using plant material covered with moss and lined with soft fibers. It suspends the nest from a vine or aerial roots, typically between 0.4 and 2 m (1 and 7 ft) above the ground. The clutch is two or three eggs. The incubation period, time to fledging, and details of parental care are not known.

=== Vocalization ===
The olive-streaked flycatcher is mostly silent outside the breeding season. It usually sings the most at dawn, and usually low to the ground in dense vegetation. Its song is an "extremely high-pitched (c 8-10 kHz), prolonged series of extremely fast tinkling notes, descending and ascending in an undulating pattern over the length of the song". Its call is "a very high-pitched (c7.3-9.6 kHz), clear, descending Tsew".

== Status ==
The IUCN has assessed the olive-streaked flycatcher as being of Least Concern. It has a large range; its population size is not known and is believed to be decreasing. No immediate threats have been identified. It is considered common in Costa Rica. It is "easily overlooked by both visual and auditory fieldwork".
