= William Burnham Stevens =

American jurist (1843–1931)

District Attorney of Middlesex County, Massachusetts
- In office 1880–1890
- Preceded by: John Wilkes Hammond
- Succeeded by: Patrick H. Cooney

Personal details
- Born: March 23, 1843 Stoneham, Massachusetts, U.S.
- Died: July 15, 1931 (aged 88) Stoneham, Massachusetts, U.S.
- Party: Republican
- Spouse(s): Amelia Josephine Hill (1868–1869; her death); Mary Williamine Green (1873–1931; her death)
- Occupation: Lawyer

William Burnham Stevens (March 23, 1843 – July 15, 1931) was an American jurist who was a justice of the Massachusetts Superior Court and district attorney of Middlesex County, Massachusetts.

== Early life ==
Stevens was born to Dr. William Flint and Mary Jane Gould (Burnham) Stevens on March 23, 1843, in Stoneham, Massachusetts. He attended Phillips Academy and entered Dartmouth College in 1861, but left school to join in the Union Army during the American Civil War. His enlisted in the 50th Massachusetts Infantry Regiment on September 19, 1862, and was promoted to Corporal. Stevens served in the Department of the Gulf under Nathaniel P. Banks and was present at the siege of Port Hudson. He was discharged on August 24, 1863.

Stevens graduated from Dartmouth in 1865 and studied law at Harvard Law School and in the office of Sweetser & Gardner. Stevens married Amelia Josephine Hill on October 20, 1868. She died on December 22, 1869, and Stevens married Mary Williamine Green on September 30, 1873. He had four children with his second wife, Josephine, Mary, Frances, and William. Mary Green Stevens died on March 3, 1931.

== Legal career ==
Stevens was admitted to the bar on July 3, 1867. He opened his own practice in Stoneham on January 1, 1868. In 1880 he was appointed district attorney for Middlesex County, Massachusetts by Governor John Davis Long. He resigned in 1890 to focus on his private practice. In 1891, Stevens was an unsuccessful candidate for the Massachusetts House of Representatives. In 1895, Stevens was appointed receiver for the Commonwealth Mutual Fire Insurance Company.

In 1898, Stevens was appointed guardian for John Frank Weeks, a wealthy New Hampshire-native whose financial eccentricities resulted in the creation of a spendthrift trust. In 1901 the 70-year old Weeks married 48-year old Mary Susie Blaisdell in New Hampshire. The marriage upset Weeks' family and Stevens had him taken back to Massachusetts by a detective. A legal battle ensued which decided Stevens did not have to power to prevent Weeks from marrying or living wherever he wanted.

== Massachusetts Superior Court ==
In 1898, Stevens was appointed to the Massachusetts Superior Court by Governor Roger Wolcott. In 1902 he presided over the trial of Joseph Wilfred Blondin, who was charged with murdering his wife. Stevens retired from the bench in 1917.

== Later life ==
Stevens was the author of a book on the history of Stoneham and another on the history of the 50th Massachusetts Infantry Regiment. He was also the president of the Stoneham Five Cent Savings Bank. He died on July 15, 1931, at his home in Stoneham.
