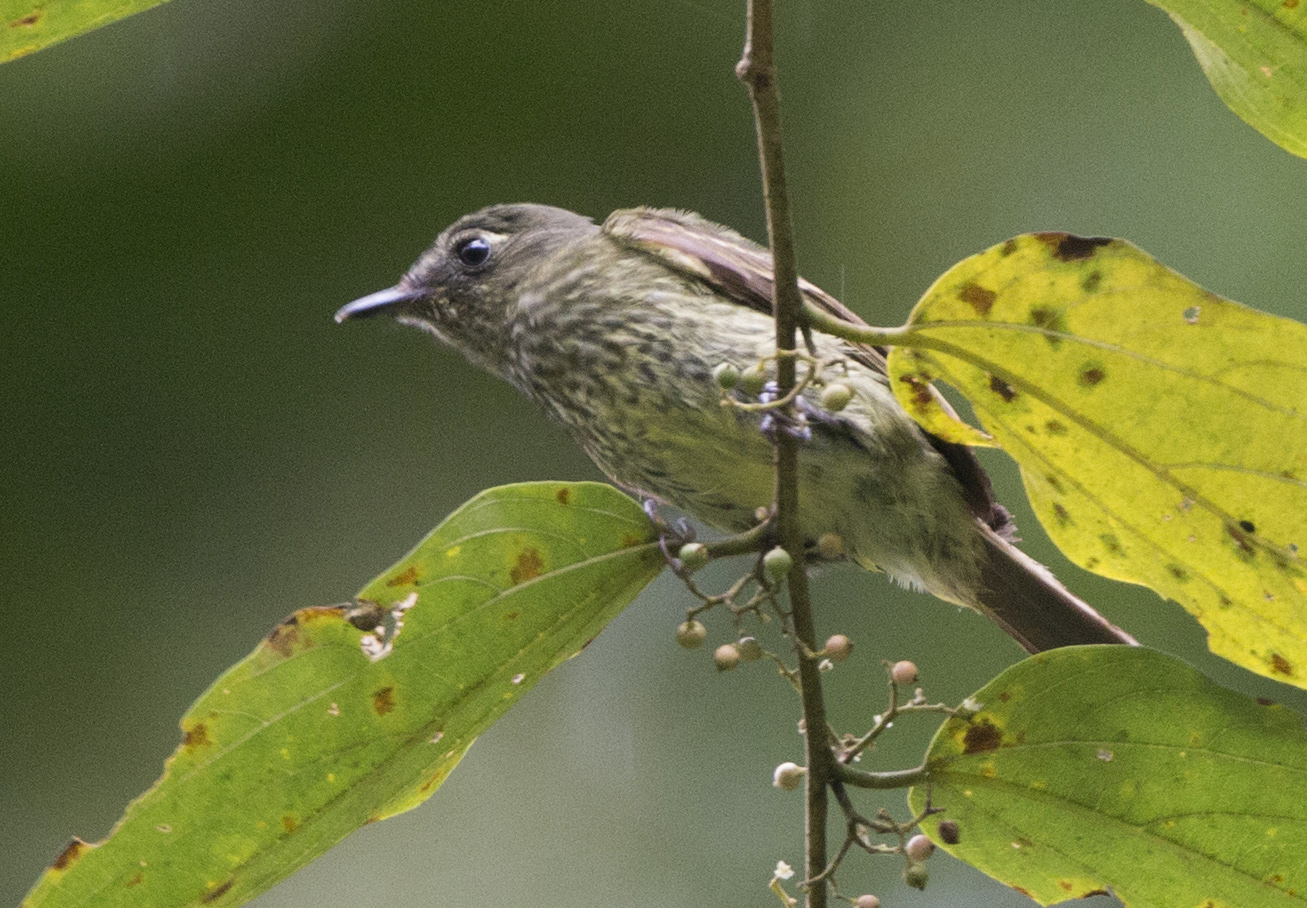
- near Zamora, Ecuador

Conservation status
- Least Concern (IUCN 3.1)

Scientific classification
- Kingdom: Animalia
- Phylum: Chordata
- Class: Aves
- Order: Passeriformes
- Family: Tyrannidae
- Genus: Mionectes
- Species: M. galbinus

Binomial name
- Mionectes galbinus Bangs, 1902

= Olive-striped flycatcher =

Species of bird

The olive-striped flycatcher (Mionectes galbinus) is a species of bird in the family Tyrannidae, the tyrant flycatchers. It is found in Bolivia, Colombia, Ecuador, Panama, Peru, Trinidad, and Venezuela.

== Taxonomy and systematics ==
The four subspecies of what is now the olive-striped flycatcher were previously treated as subspecies of what is now the olive-streaked flycatcher (Mionectes olivaceus). (Confusingly, the original unsplit species was called the olive-striped flycatcher but bore the present olive-streaked flycatcher's binomial Mionectes olivaceus.) Based primarily on vocal differences the species were separated by taxonomic systems beginning in 2016, leaving the olive-streaked flycatcher as a monotypic species. However, as of late 2024, the North American and South American Classification Committees of the American Ornithological Society have not agreed to the split. They retain the olive-striped flycatcher/Mionectes olivaceus names.

The four subspecies of the olive-striped flycatcher are:

- M. g. hederaceus Bangs, 1910
- M. g. galbinus Bangs, 1902
- M. g. venezuelensis Ridgway, 1906
- M. g. fasciaticollis Chapman, 1923

Some authors have suggested that M. g. galbinus should be treated as a separate monotypic species. Others have suggested that the olive-striped flycatcher "may consist of several cryptic species, a possibility that merits further investigation".

== Description ==
The olive-striped flycatcher is 13 to 13.5 cm (5.1 to 5.3 in) long and weighs 10 to 17.5 g (0.35 to 0.62 oz). The sexes have the same plumage. Adults of the nominate subspecies M. g. galbinus have a dark olive and yellowish white streaked face and a small white spot behind the eye. Their crown, nape, and upperparts are yellow green. Their wings and tail are dusky olive with thin yellowish green edges on the flight feathers. Their throat and upper breast are streaked with dark olive and yellowish white. Their lower breast and flanks are streaked with dark olive and yellow and their belly is unstreaked pale yellow.

Subspecies M. g. hederaceus has darker upperparts, more whitish and dark grayish olive throat streaks, and a paler yellowish white belly than the nominate. M. g. venezuelensis has a darker crown, slightly darker upperparts, and paler yellow underparts than the nominate. M. g. fasciaticollis has uniform dark olive upperparts and richer yellow underparts than the nominate. Both sexes of all subspecies have a dark brown iris, a black bill with an orange base in older birds, and dark gray or pinkish legs and feet.

== Distribution and habitat ==
The subspecies of the olive-striped flycatcher are found thus:

- M. g. hederaceus: from Veraguas Province in central Panama south through northern and western Colombia and western Ecuador almost to Peru
- M. g. galbinus: the isolated Sierra Nevada de Santa Marta in northern Colombia
- M. g. venezuelensis: the Venezuelan Coastal Ranges between Falcón and Sucre states, the Serranía del Perijá on the Venezuela-Colombia border and south along Colombia's Eastern Andes to Meta Department, and Trinidad
- M. g. fasciaticollis: from far southern Colombia's Putumayo Department south on the eastern slope of the Andes through Ecuador and Peru into extreme northwestern Bolivia

The olive-striped flycatcher inhabits the interior and edges of humid forest, secondary forest, and plantations in the foothills and subtropical zone. It tends to stay from the forest's understory to its middle levels and favors areas of heavy vegetation such as that in damp shady ravines. In elevation it occurs from sea level to 1,800 m (5,900 ft) in Panama and Colombia, between 150 and 3,000 m (500 and 9,800 ft) but mostly between 900 and 2,300 m (3,000 and 7,500 ft) in Venezuela, from near sea level to 2,000 m (6,600 ft) in western Ecuador, between 400 and 2,000 m (1,300 and 6,600 ft) in eastern Ecuador, and generally between 300 and 1,400 m (1,000 and 4,600 ft) but locally to 2,100 m (6,900 ft) in Peru.

== Behavior ==
=== Movement ===
The olive-striped flycatcher is mostly a year-round resident but is known to make elevational movements in the Venezuelan Coastal Ranges.

=== Feeding ===
The olive-striped flycatcher feeds mostly on fruits but also includes insects in its diet. It forages in the forest understory but also up into its middle level, especially in dense vegetation. It hover-gleans fruit and insects in short sallies from a perch and also picks some while perched. It usually forages by itself though also rarely in pairs or small groups. It occasionally joins a mixed-species feeding flock.

=== Breeding ===
The olive-striped flycatcher's breeding season has not been defined but appears to vary geographically. For example, it includes April and May in Ecuador, spans February to June on Trinidad, and includes October and November in Peru. In some parts of its range males display to females at a lek. The species makes a pear-shaped nest with a side entrance using plant material covered with moss and lined with soft fibers. It suspends the nest from a vine or aerial roots, typically between 0.4 and 2 m (1 and 7 ft) above the ground. The clutch is two or three eggs. The incubation period, time to fledging, and details of parental care are not known.

=== Vocalization ===
The olive-striped flycatcher is mostly silent outside the breeding season. It usually sings the most at dawn, and usually low to the ground in dense vegetation. Its song varies among the subspecies but all are "extremely high-pitched and long insect- or hummingbird-like". The song in Venezuela is described as "a high, almost hissing tse-tse-tse-tse that is ventriloquial and slightly rises and falls. The song in Peru is described as "extremely high-pitched, thin whistles in rapid succession: tseewtseeet-tseew 'tseeet-tseew 'steeet...".

== Status ==
The IUCN has assessed the olive-striped flycatcher as being of Least Concern. It has a very large range; its population size is not known and is believed to be decreasing. No immediate threats have been identified. It is considered common in Colombia and Venezuela, fairly common in Ecuador and Peru, and uncommon in Bolivia. It occurs in many protected areas throughout its range. It is "easily overlooked by both visual and auditory fieldwork".
