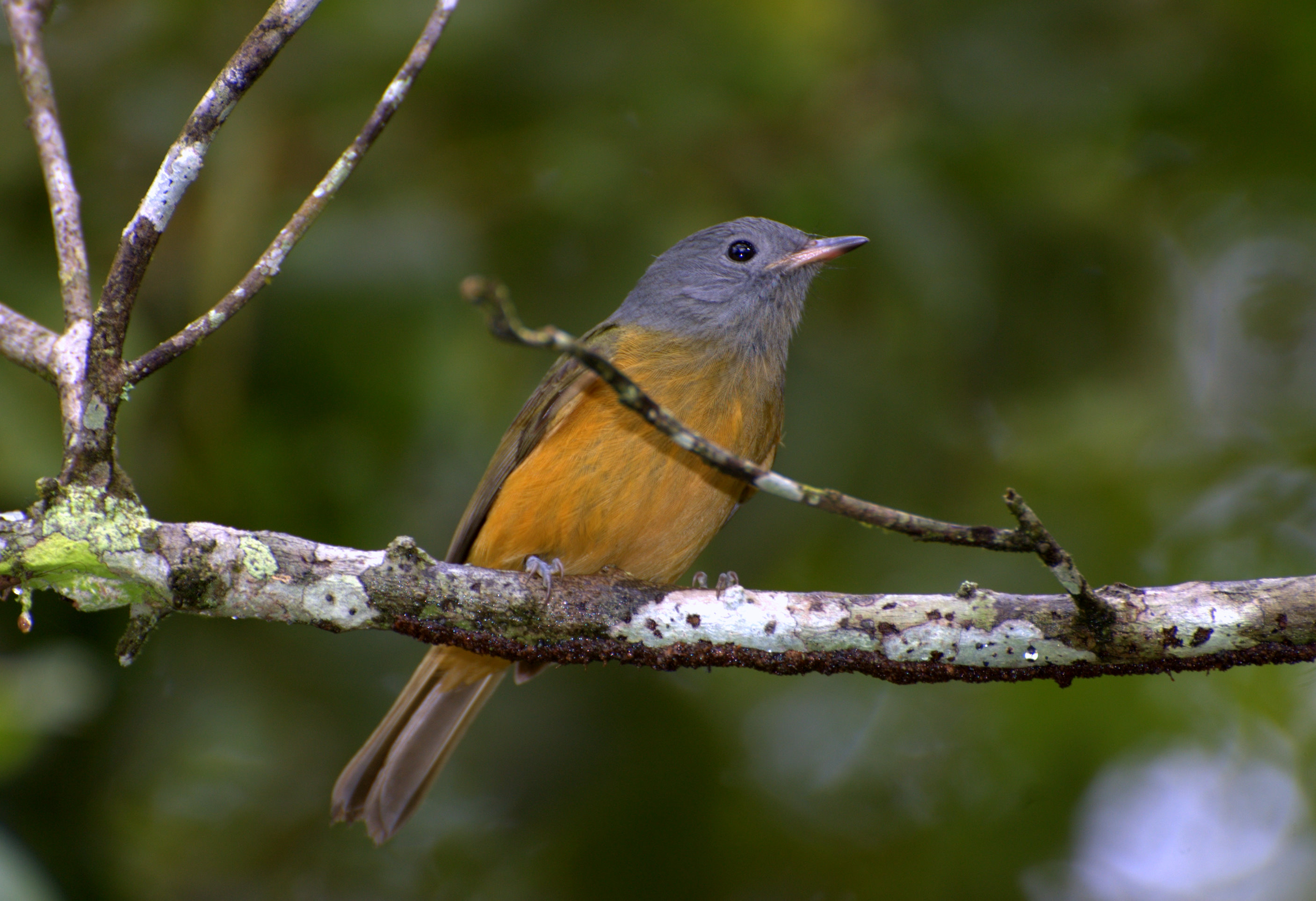

Conservation status
- Least Concern (IUCN 3.1)

Scientific classification
- Kingdom: Animalia
- Phylum: Chordata
- Class: Aves
- Order: Passeriformes
- Family: Tyrannidae
- Genus: Mionectes
- Species: M. rufiventris

Binomial name
- Mionectes rufiventris Cabanis, 1846

= Grey-hooded flycatcher =

Species of bird

The grey-hooded flycatcher (Mionectes rufiventris) is a species of bird in the family Tyrannidae, the tyrant flycatchers. It is found in Argentina, Brazil, and Paraguay.

== Taxonomy and systematics ==
For a time in the mid-twentieth century the grey-hooded flycatcher was placed in genus Pipromorpha, which by the 1980s had been merged into Mionectes. A study published in 2008 suggested that Pipromorpha be resurrected for this species and two others but that action has not been followed.

The grey-hooded flycatcher is monotypic.

== Description ==
The grey-hooded flycatcher is 13.5 to 14 cm (5.3 to 5.5 in) long and weighs about 14 g (0.49 oz). The sexes have the same plumage. Adults have a slate gray crown, nape, and face. Their back and rump are dark olive. Their wings and tail are dusky olive. Their chin and throat are pale gray that becomes buffy olive on the lower breast and bright cinnamon-buff on the belly, flanks, and undertail coverts. Both sexes have a dark brown iris, a long dark brownish gray bill with a pale pinkish base to the mandible, and medium brownish gray legs and feet.

== Distribution and habitat ==
The grey-hooded flycatcher is found in southeastern Brazil from Minas Gerais and Espírito Santo south to southeastern Mato Grosso do Sul and northern Rio Grande do Sul and west into southeastern Paraguay and northeastern Argentina's Misiones Province. It is a bird of the Atlantic Forest, inhabiting the interior and edges of humid forest both primary and secondary. In elevation it ranges from sea level to 1,000 m (3,300 ft).

== Behavior ==
=== Movement ===
The grey-hooded flycatcher is a year-round resident.

=== Feeding ===
The grey-hooded flycatcher feeds on a variety of fruits and arthropods. It forages in the forest understory. It mostly hover-gleans fruit and insects in short sallies from a perch, and occasionally captures prey on the wing.

=== Breeding ===
The grey-hooded flycatcher's breeding season has not been defined but appears to include August to February in Brazil and at least September and October in Argentina. Males display at leks, though the individuals might be well separated. There they perch 2 to 4 m (7 to 13 ft) above the ground and sing and display. One display is a series of jumps straight up with flicks of the wings, and another is short fluttery flights. Their nest is a pear-shaped ball with a side entrance made from plant fibers covered with moss and lined with finer fibers. It is typically hung from a drooping vine about 2 m (7 ft) up and usually over a small stream. The clutch is three eggs. The incubation period, time to fledging, and details of parental care are not known.

=== Vocalization ===
The grey-hooded flycatcher's song is a "slightly descending and accelerating, at the end slightly rising and slowing down series of nasal tjew notes".

== Status ==
The IUCN has assessed the grey-hooded flycatcher as being of Least Concern. It has a large range; its population size is not known and is believed to be decreasing. No immediate threats have been identified. It is considered uncommon to fairly common and occurs in at least seven national parks across its range.
