= Patrick H. Cooney =

American attorney and politician (1845–1915)

District Attorney of Middlesex County, Massachusetts
- In office 1890–1893
- Preceded by: William Burnham Stevens
- Succeeded by: Fred N. Wier

Personal details
- Born: December 20, 1845 Stockbridge, Massachusetts, U.S.
- Died: December 15, 1915 (aged 69) Natick, Massachusetts, U.S.
- Party: Republican
- Spouse: Sarah Caroline Allen (1895–1897; her death)
- Occupation: Lawyer

Patrick Henry Cooney (December 20, 1845 – December 15, 1915) was an American attorney who served as district attorney of Middlesex County, Massachusetts from 1890 to 1893.

== Early life ==
Cooney was born on December 20, 1845, in Stockbridge, Massachusetts. He was educated in the New York City public schools and Nathaniel Topliff Allen's West Newton English and Classical School. In 1866 he graduated from Natick High School.

== Career ==
Cooney studied law with the firm of Bacon & Sawin and was admitted to the bar on November 1, 1868. He opened a practice in Natick, Massachusetts on January 1, 1869. From 1880 to 1883, Cooney was a member of the Natick school committee. In 1881 he was the Republican nominee for Natick's seat in the Massachusetts House of Representatives, but lost the election by 3 votes. In 1884, Cooney was appointed an assistant district attorney for Middlesex County, Massachusetts. From 1890 to 1893 he was the county's district attorney. After leaving the DA's office, Cooney focused on defending corporations, notably defending the West End Street Railway and Boston Elevated Railway in accident and land damage cases.

== Personal life ==
On September 12, 1895, Cooney married Sarah Caroline Allen, daughter of his former educator Nathaniel T. Allen. Sarah Allen Cooney helped found the Unity Church in Natick by organizing Unitarian ministers to give sermons at her home, and later at the Universalist Church and Red Men's Hall. She died during childbirth on November 4, 1897. The Cooney's daughter, Sarah Caroline Cooney, died two days later. In January 1903, the Sarah Allen Cooney Memorial Church was dedicated in Natick by Edward Everett Hale and Samuel A. Eliot.
