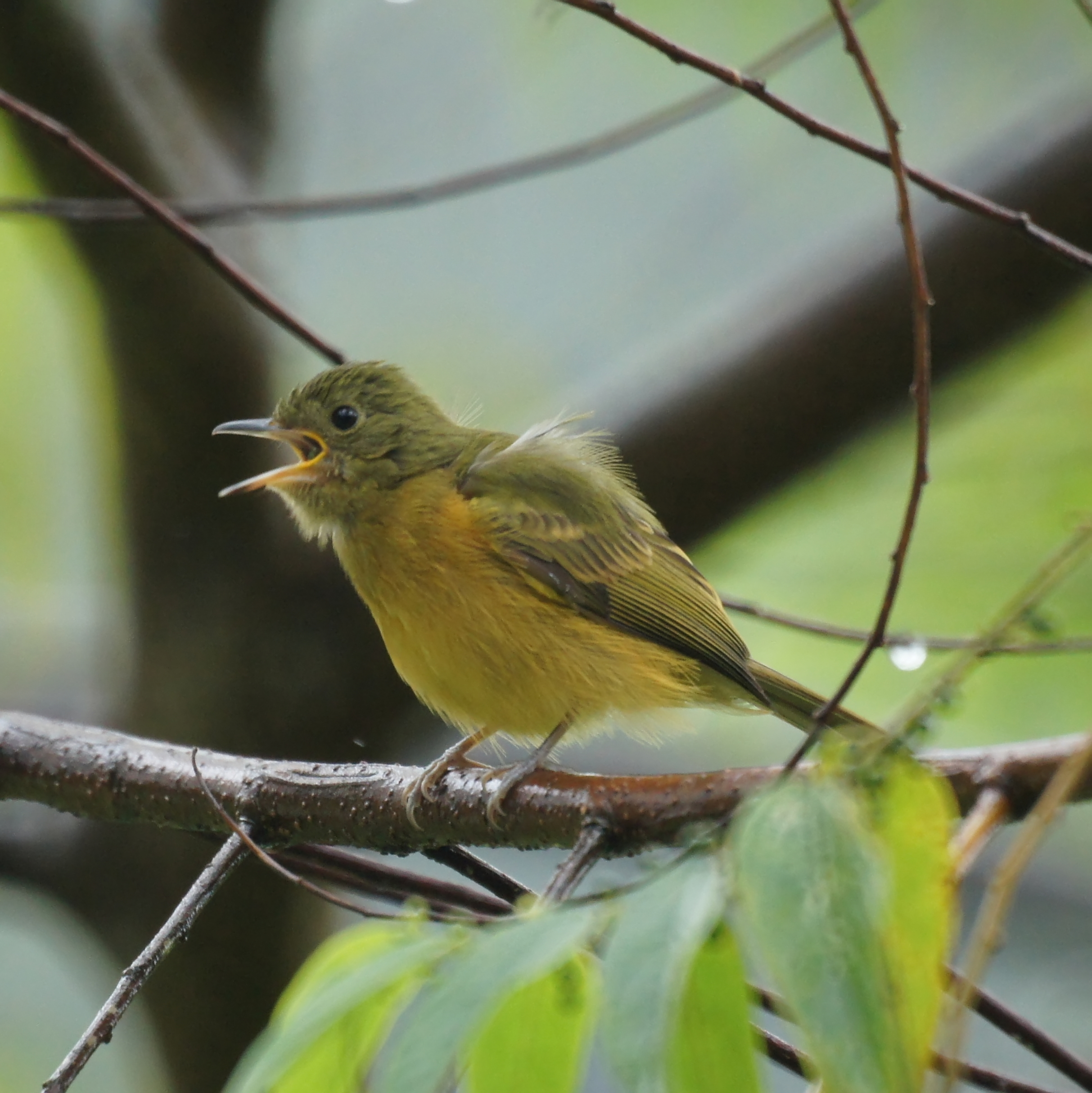

Conservation status
- Least Concern (IUCN 3.1)

Scientific classification
- Kingdom: Animalia
- Phylum: Chordata
- Class: Aves
- Order: Passeriformes
- Family: Tyrannidae
- Genus: Mionectes
- Species: M. oleagineus

Binomial name
- Mionectes oleagineus (Lichtenstein, MHC, 1823)

Synonyms
- Mionectes oleaginea (lapsus)

= Ochre-bellied flycatcher =

Species of bird

The ochre-bellied flycatcher (Mionectes oleagineus) is a small bird of the tyrant flycatcher family. It is found in Mexico, Central America, Trinidad and Tobago, and northern South America.

== Taxonomy and systematics ==
For a time in the mid-twentieth century the ochre-bellied flycatcher was placed in genus Pipromorpha, which by the 1980s had been merged into Mionectes. A study published in 2008 suggested that Pipromorpha be resurrected for this species and two others but that action has not been followed. The study did reveal that, rather than the uplifting of the Andes giving rise to the ochre-bellied flycatcher's subspecies, at least four separate lineages including some trans-Andean movement are responsible. It also suggested that the ochre-bellied flycatcher might comprise more than one species.

As of late 2024 the ochre-bellied flycatcher had these seven subspecies:

- M. o. assimilis Sclater, PL, 1859
- M. o. parcus Bangs, 1900
- M. o. abdominalis (Phelps, WH & Phelps, WH Jr, 1955)
- M. o. pallidiventris Hellmayr, 1906
- M. o. dorsalis (Phelps, WH & Phelps, WH Jr, 1952)
- M. o. pacificus (Todd, 1921)
- M. o. oleagineus (Lichtenstein, MHC, 1823)

== Description ==
The ochre-bellied flycatcher is 12.5 to 14 cm (4.9 to 5.5 in) long and weighs 7.5 to 18.5 g (0.26 to 0.65 oz). The sexes have the same plumage. Adults of the nominate subspecies M. o. oleagineus have a greenish olive head, nape, back, and rump. Their wings are olive with wide buffy ochraceous edges on the tertials and thinner buffy ochraceous edges on the coverts that show as wing bars. Their tail is dark grayish brown or dusky olive. Their throat and underparts are rich cinnamon buff. The other subspecies differ slightly. M. o. assimilis lacks the buffy ochraceous edges on the wing coverts, and the edges on M. o. abdominalis and M. o. dorsalis are small so their wing bars are fainter than the nominate's. M. o. abdominalis has somewhat grayer upperparts and breast than the nominate. The subspecies other than the nominate have a variable wash of olive on their throats. Both sexes of all subspecies have a dark brown iris, a black maxilla, a black mandible with a variably colored but paler base, and legs and feet of various shades of gray.

== Distribution and habitat ==
The subspecies of the ochre-bellied flycatcher are found thus:

- M. o. assimilis: from Veracruz, Oaxaca, and the Yucatán Peninsula in southern Mexico south on both the Caribbean and Pacific slopes through Central America into western Panama.
- M. o. parcus: from the Canal Zone in eastern Panama across west-central and northern Colombia into northwestern Venezuela as far as western Trujillo state and south in the valleys of Colombia's Cauca and Magdalena rivers
- M. o. abdominalis: the Venezuelan Coastal Range from Yaracuy east to the Capital District and Miranda's Cerro Negro
- M. o. pallidiventris: Trinidad, Tobago, and the northeastern Venezuelan states of Anzoátegui, Sucre, Monagas, and Delta Amacuro
- M. o. dorsalis: the tepuis Chimantá and Roraima in southern Venezuela
- M. o. pacificus: from Nariño Department in far southwestern Colombia south on the western Andean slope through western Ecuador into far northwestern Peru's Tumbes Department
- M. o. oleagineus: the eastern half of Colombia, southeastern Venezuela, the Guianas, and the Amazon Basin in Brazil, eastern Ecuador, eastern Peru, and northern Bolivia; separately in coastal southeastern Brazil between Paraíba and Rio do Janeiro states

The ochre-bellied flycatcher generally inhabits the interior and edges of humid to wet evergreen forest, semi-deciduous forest, and nearby secondary forest in the tropical and subtropical zones. It also inhabits gallery forest, plantations, gardens, and in the Amazon Basin both várzea and terra firme forest. In elevation it occurs from sea level to 1,800 m (5,900 ft) in northern Central America, to 1,200 m (3,900 ft) in Costa Rica, to 1,300 m (4,300 ft) in Colombia, to 1,400 m (4,600 ft) in western Venezuela, to 1,800 m (5,900 ft) in eastern Venezuela except on the tepuis, and between 1,450 and 1,850 m (4,800 and 6,100 ft) on the Venezuelan tepuis. It occurs from sea level to 1,800 m (5,900 ft) in Brazil, mostly below 1,000 m (3,300 ft) in Ecuador, and below 1,300 m (4,300 ft) in Peru.

== Behavior ==
=== Movement ===
The ochre-bellied flycatcher is a year-round resident.

=== Feeding ===
The ochre-bellied flycatcher feeds on a variety of fruits and insects. It forages at all levels of the forest though mostly only as far up as its middle level. It hover-gleans fruit and insects in short sallies from a perch and also picks some while perched. It usually forages by itself and occasionally joins a mixed-species feeding flock, especially at fruiting trees.

=== Breeding ===
Male ochre-bellied flycatchers court both singly and at leks, with about half of the overall population using each strategy. While courting they sing, flash their wings, and erect their crown feathers. The species' breeding seasons vary geographically but have not been fully defined. The species makes a pear-shaped nest with a side entrance using plant material covered with moss and lined with soft fibers. It suspends the nest from a vine or aerial roots. The clutch is usually three eggs, sometimes two and very rarely four. Females alone incubate, in central Panama for about 23 days. The incubation period elsewhere, time to fledging, and other details of parental care are not known.

=== Vocalization ===
The ochre-bellied flycatcher is mostly silent outside the breeding season. Its song has been described as "a series of sharp chip notes that is followed by a number of louder, more emphatic notes". Other descriptions are "a variety of chirping notes, some fast and sharp, others nasal, with the most distinctive phrase being a cheea-cheea-cheea", "a variable series of chup, up, and char notes", "a series of quiet prrp notes followed by several louder, squeaky, descending tseew or skeew notes", and a "very high, slightly rolling and ascending preet, repeated and alternated with [a] series of 5-7 low, nasal tjuw notes".

== Status ==
The IUCN has assessed the ochre-bellied flycatcher as being of Least Concern. It has an extremely large range and an estimated population of at least five million mature individuals; its population is believed to be decreasing. No immediate threats have been identified. "As is true of all bird species that primarily inhabit forested habitats, Ochre-bellied Flycatcher is vulnerable to habitat loss or degradation."
