= List of birds of Brazil =

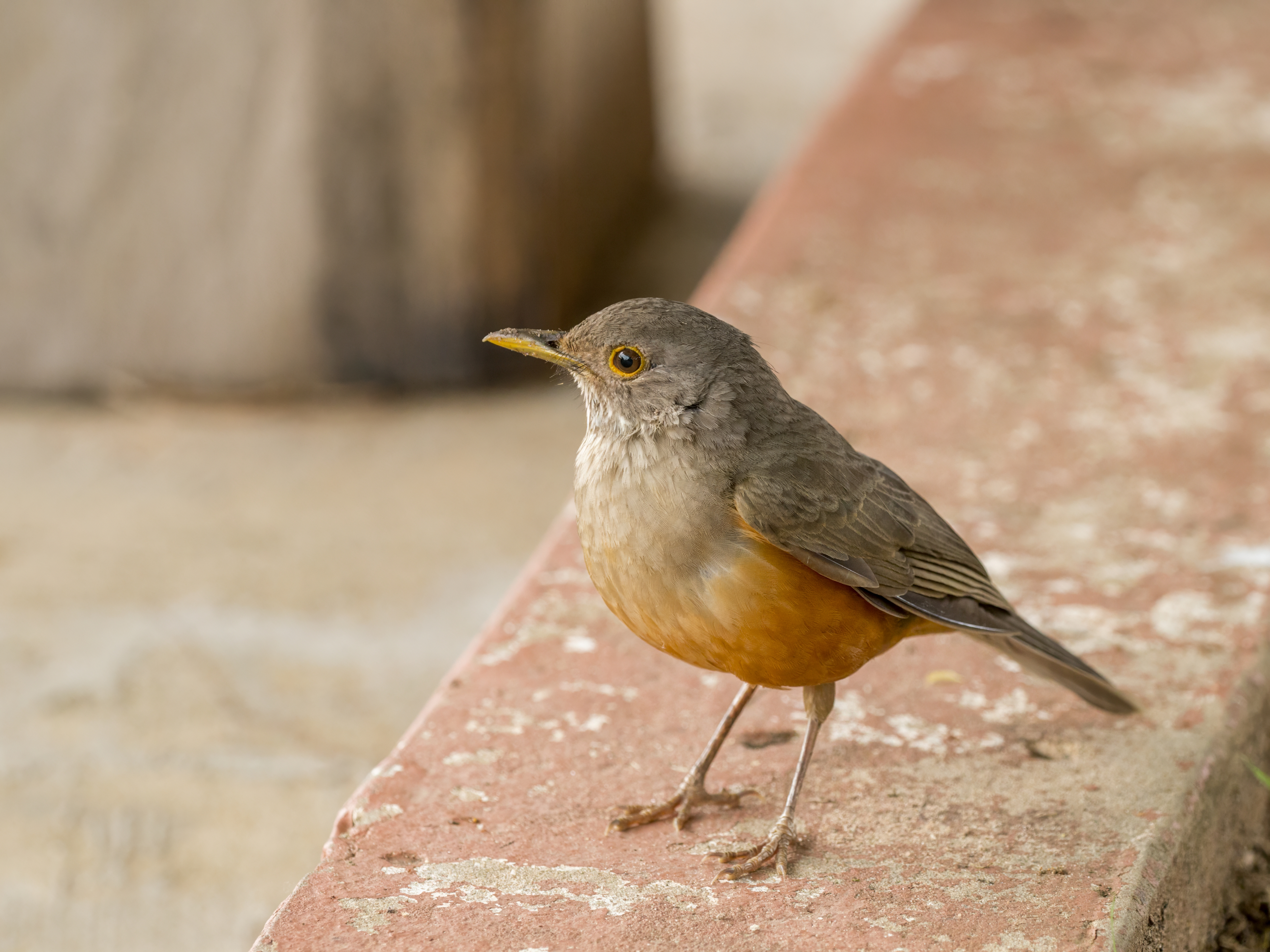
The rufous-bellied thrush is the national bird of Brazil.

Brazil has one of the richest bird diversities in the world. The avifauna of Brazil include a total of 1867 confirmed species of which 242 are endemic. Five have been introduced by humans, 93 are rare or vagrants, and seven are known or thought to be extinct or extirpated. An additional 14 species are unconfirmed (see below).

Brazil hosts about 60% of the bird species recorded for all of South America. These numbers are still increasing almost every year, due to new occurrences, new species being described, or splits of existing species. About 10% of the bird species found in Brazil are, nonetheless, threatened.

In June 2013 a simultaneous discovery of fifteen bird species in Brazil was announced, the first such since 1871, when August von Pelzeln described forty new species. The birds were from the families Corvidae, Thamnophilidae, Dendrocolaptidae, Tyrannidae, and Polioptilidae. Eleven of the new species are endemics of Brazil and four also inhabit Peru and Bolivia.

Except as an entry is cited otherwise, the list of species is that of the South American Classification Committee (SACC). The list's taxonomic treatment (designation and sequence of orders, families, and species) and nomenclature (common and scientific names) are also those of the SACC unless noted otherwise. Capitalization within English names follows Wikipedia practice, i.e. only the first word of a name is capitalized unless a place name such as São Paulo is used. Fifteen additional species are added from other sources and are not included in the above counts; these reports have not been confirmed by the SACC.

The notes of population status, for instance (endangered), are those of the International Union for Conservation of Nature (IUCN) Red List. The status notes apply to the worldwide population, not solely the Brazilian population except for endemic species.

The following tags have been used to highlight several categories of occurrence.

- (V) Vagrant - a species that rarely or accidentally occurs in Brazil
- (E) Endemic - a species endemic to Brazil
- (I) Introduced - a species introduced to Brazil as a consequence, direct or indirect, of human actions
- (U) Unconfirmed - a species recorded but with "no tangible evidence" according to the SACC
- (UC) Unconfirmed - A record from a non-SACC source and unconfirmed by the SACC

The IUCN Red list codes used in increasing order of risk are:

Conservation status codes
LC = least concern	NT = near threatened	VU = vulnerable
EN = endangered	CR = critically endangered	EW = extinct in the wild
EX = extinct		

== Rheas ==
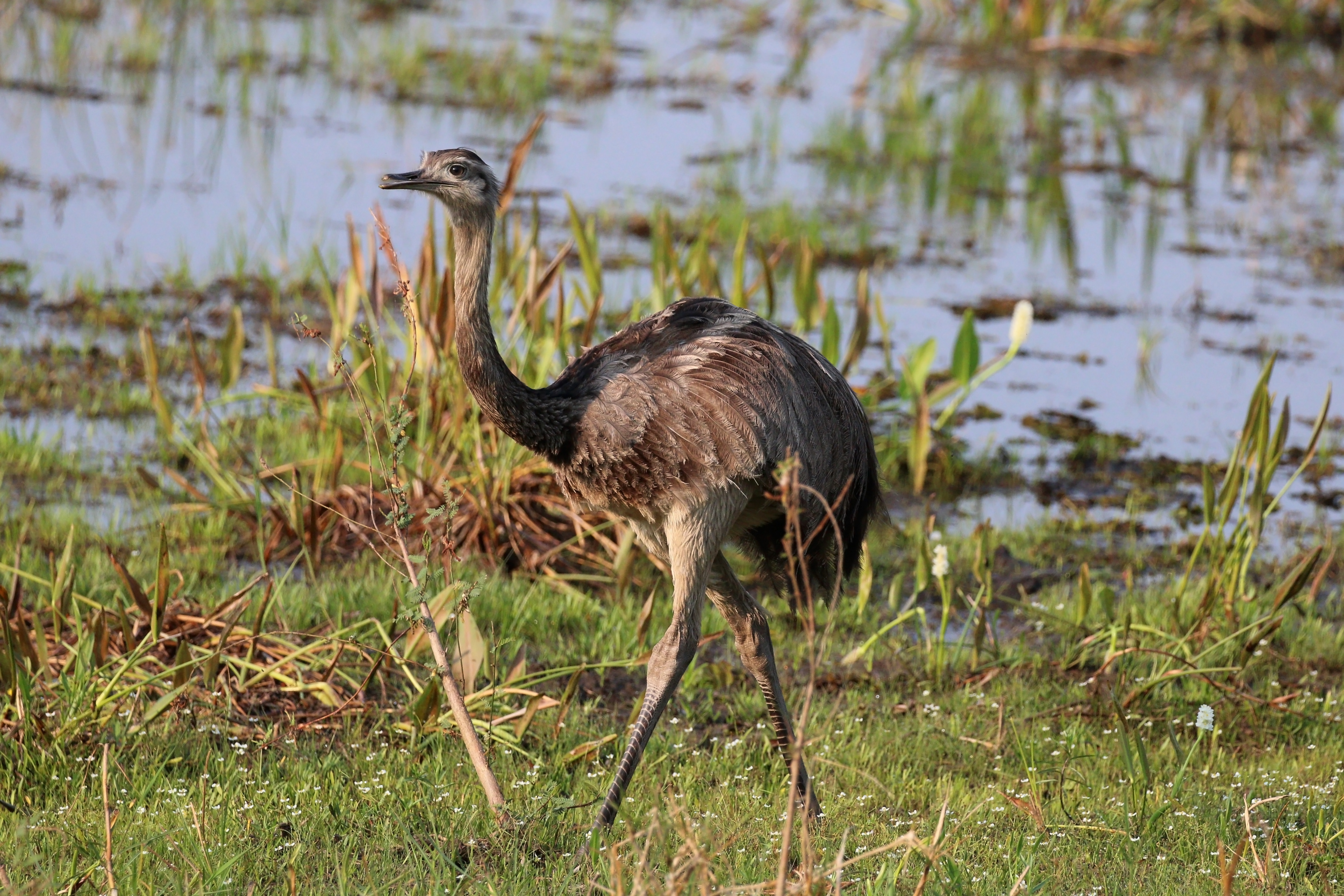
Greater rhea

Order: Rheiformes Family: Rheidae

The rheas are large flightless birds native to South America. Their feet have three toes rather than four which allows them to run faster.

- Greater rhea, Rhea americana (Linnaeus, 1758)

== Tinamous ==
Order: Tinamiformes Family: Tinamidae

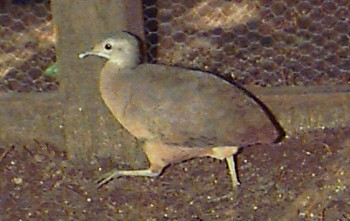
Little tinamou

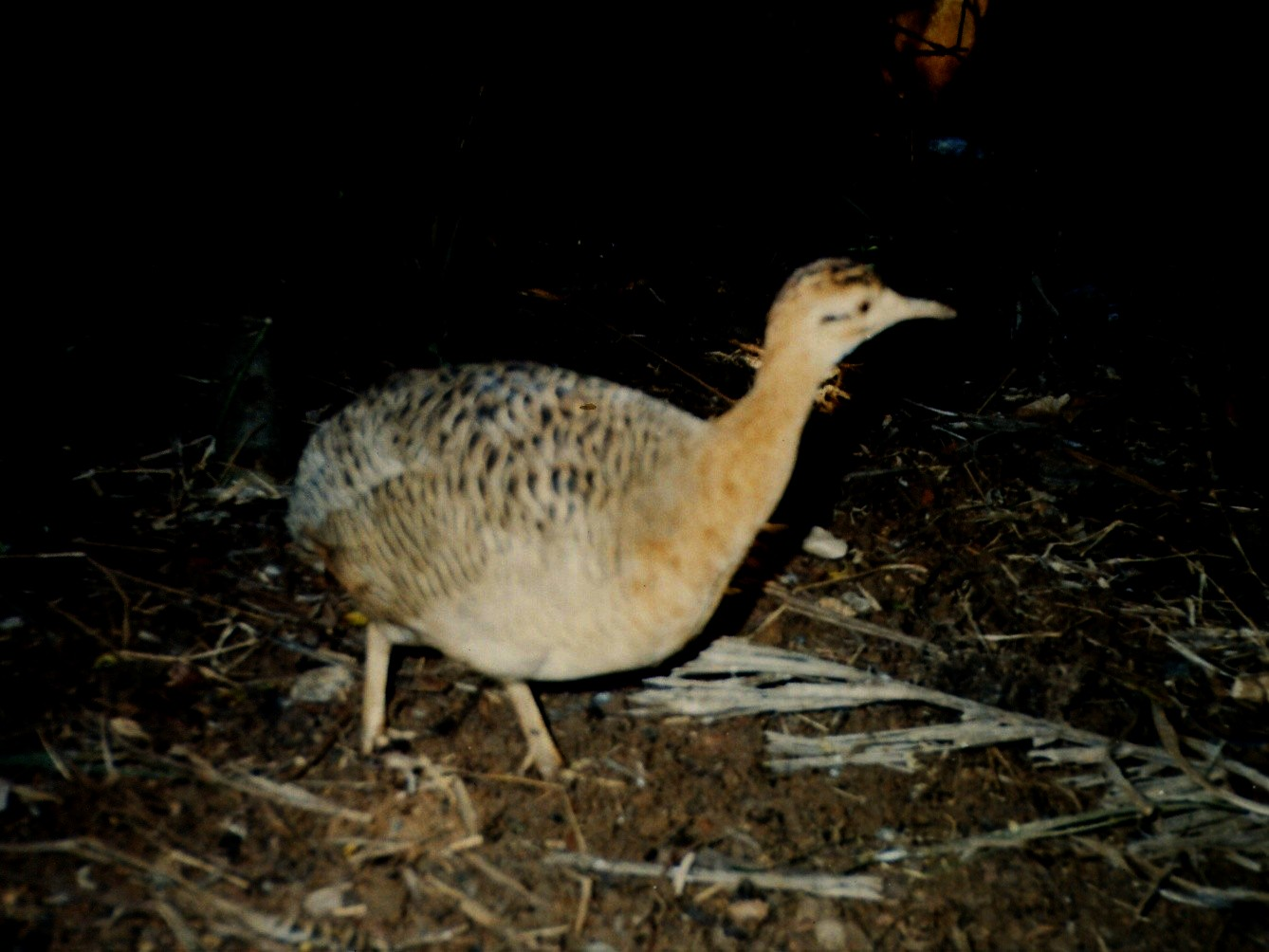
Red-winged tinamou

The tinamous are one of the most ancient groups of bird. Although they look similar to other ground-dwelling birds like quail and grouse, they have no close relatives and are classified as a single family, Tinamidae, within their own order, the Tinamiformes. They are distantly related to the ratites (order Struthioniformes), which includes the rheas, emus, and kiwis.

- Gray tinamou, Tinamus tao Temminck, 1815 VU
- Solitary tinamou, Tinamus solitarius (Vieillot, 1819) NT
- Great tinamou, Tinamus major (Gmelin, JF, 1789)
- White-throated tinamou, Tinamus guttatus Pelzeln, 1863 NT
- Cinereous tinamou, Crypturellus cinereus (Gmelin, JF, 1789)
- Little tinamou, Crypturellus soui (Hermann, 1783)
- Slaty-masked tinamou, Crypturellus resonans (E)
- Brown tinamou, Crypturellus obsoletus (Temminck, 1815)
- Undulated tinamou, Crypturellus undulatus (Temminck, 1815)
- Brazilian tinamou, Crypturellus strigulosus (Temminck, 1815)
- Gray-legged tinamou, Crypturellus duidae Zimmer, 1938
- Red-legged tinamou, Crypturellus erythropus (Pelzeln, 1863)
- Yellow-legged tinamou, Crypturellus noctivagus (Wied, 1820) (E) NT
- Black-capped tinamou, Crypturellus atrocapillus (Tschudi, 1844)
- Variegated tinamou, Crypturellus variegatus (Gmelin, JF, 1789)
- Rusty tinamou, Crypturellus brevirostris (Pelzeln, 1863)
- Bartlett's tinamou, Crypturellus bartletti (Sclater, PL & Salvin, 1873)
- Small-billed tinamou, Crypturellus parvirostris (Wagler, 1827)
- Tataupa tinamou, Crypturellus tataupa (Temminck, 1815)
- Red-winged tinamou, Rhynchotus rufescens (Temminck, 1815)
- White-bellied nothura, Nothura boraquira (Spix, 1825)
- Lesser nothura, Nothura minor (Spix, 1825) VU
- Spotted nothura, Nothura maculosa (Temminck, 1815)
- Dwarf tinamou, Taoniscus nanus (Temminck, 1815) EN

== Screamers ==
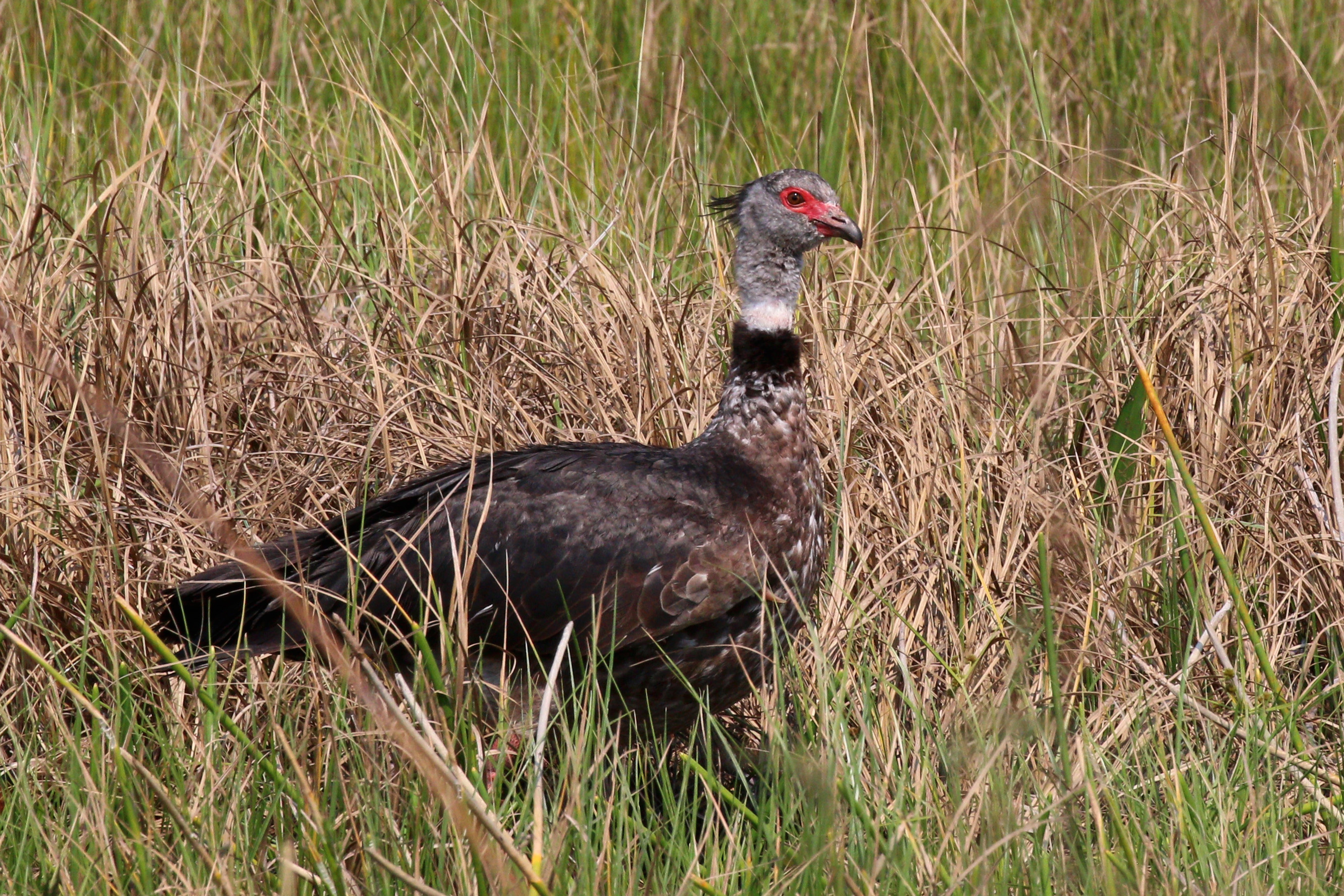
Southern screamer

Order: Anseriformes Family: Anhimidae

The screamers are a small family of birds related to the ducks. They are large, bulky birds, with a small downy head, long legs, and large feet which are only partially webbed. They have large spurs on their wings which are used in fights over mates and in territorial disputes.

- Horned screamer, Anhima cornuta (Linnaeus, 1766)
- Southern screamer, Chauna torquata (Oken, 1816)

== Ducks ==
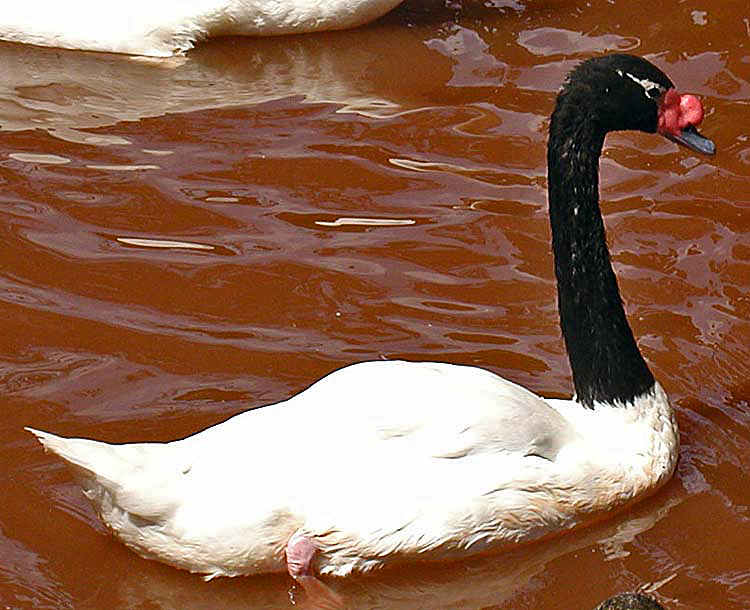
Black-necked swan

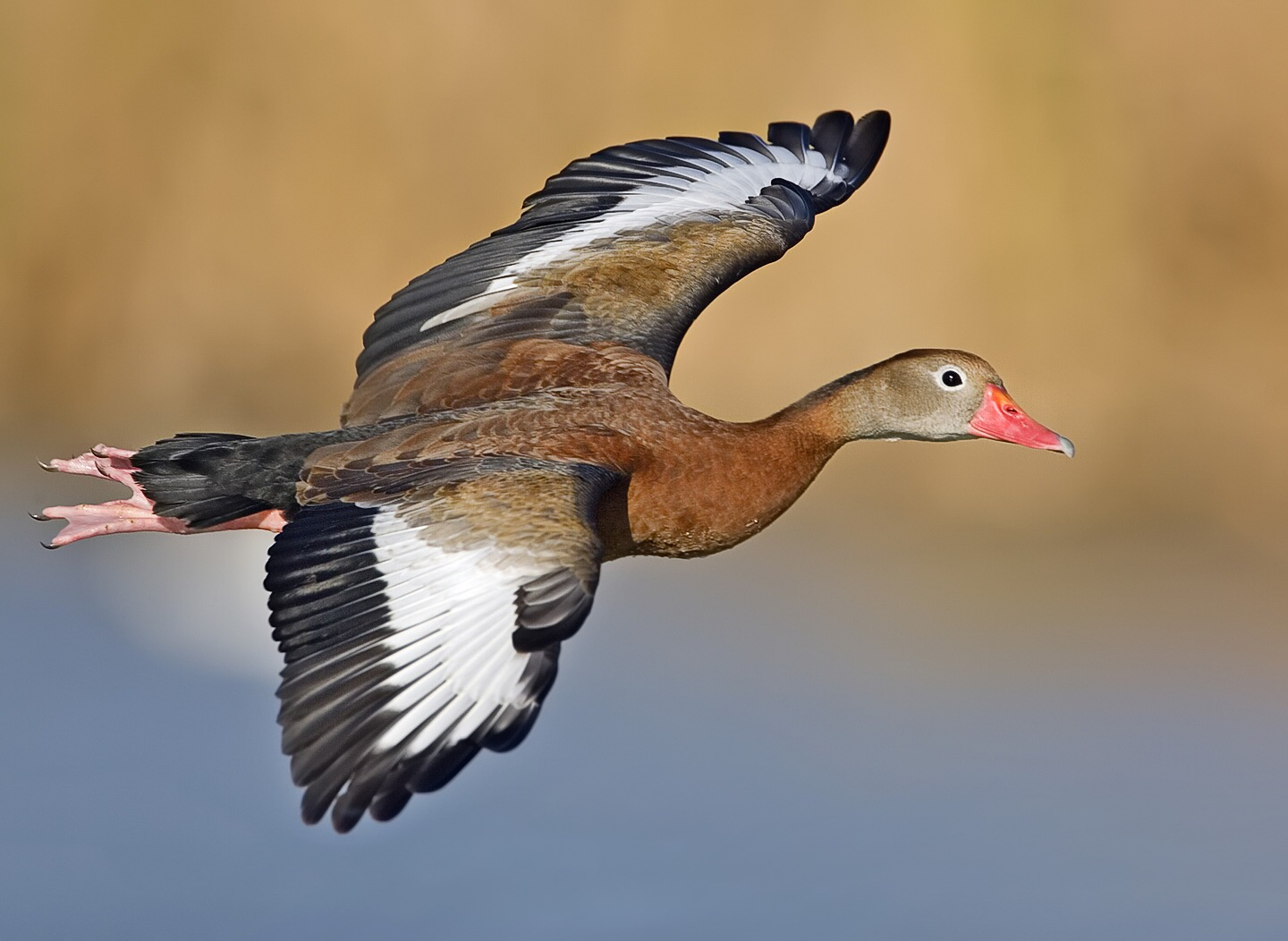
Black-bellied whistling-duck

Order: Anseriformes Family: Anatidae

Anatidae includes the ducks and most duck-like waterfowl, such as geese and swans. These birds are adapted to an aquatic existence with webbed feet, flattened bills, and feathers that are excellent at shedding water due to an oily coating.

- Fulvous whistling-duck, Dendrocygna bicolor (Vieillot, 1816)
- White-faced whistling-duck, Dendrocygna viduata (Linnaeus, 1766)
- Black-bellied whistling-duck, Dendrocygna autumnalis (Linnaeus, 1758)
- Black-necked swan, Cygnus melancoryphus (Molina, 1782)
- Coscoroba swan, Coscoroba coscoroba (Molina, 1782)
- Orinoco goose, Oressochen jubatus (Spix, 1825)
- Common shelduck, Tadorna tadorna (Linnaeus, 1758) (UC)(uncertain origin)
- Upland goose, Chloephaga pictus (Gmelin, JF, 1789) (V)
- Muscovy duck, Cairina moschata (Linnaeus, 1758)
- Comb duck, Sarkidiornis sylvicola Ihering, HFA & Ihering, R, 1907
- Ringed teal, Callonetta leucophrys (Vieillot, 1816)
- Brazilian teal, Amazonetta brasiliensis (Gmelin, JF, 1789)
- Silver teal, Spatula versicolor (Vieillot, 1816)
- Red shoveler, Spatula platalea (Vieillot, 1816)
- Blue-winged teal, Spatula discors (Linnaeus, 1766)
- Cinnamon teal, Spatula cyanoptera (Vieillot, 1816) (V)
- Chiloe wigeon, Mareca sibilatrix (Poepping, 1829)
- White-cheeked pintail, Anas bahamensis Linnaeus, 1758
- Northern pintail, Anas acuta Linnaeus, 1758 (V)
- Yellow-billed pintail, Anas georgica Gmelin, JF, 1789
- Yellow-billed teal, Anas flavirostris Vieillot, 1816
- Southern pochard, Netta erythrophthalma (Wied, 1833)
- Rosy-billed pochard, Netta peposaca (Vieillot, 1816)
- Brazilian merganser, Mergus octosetaceus Vieillot, 1817 CR
- Black-headed duck, Heteronetta atricapilla (Merrem, 1841)
- Masked duck, Nomonyx dominicus (Linnaeus, 1766)
- Lake duck, Oxyura vittata (Philippi, 1860)

== Guans ==
Order: Galliformes Family: Cracidae

The Cracidae are large birds, similar in general appearance to turkeys. The guans and curassows live in trees, but the smaller chachalacas are found in more open scrubby habitats. They are generally dull-plumaged, but the curassows and some guans have colorful facial ornaments.

- Marail guan, Penelope marail (Müller, PLS, 1776)
- Rusty-margined guan, Penelope superciliaris Temminck, 1815 NT
- Spix's guan, Penelope jacquacu Spix, 1825
- Dusky-legged guan, Penelope obscura Temminck, 1815
- White-crested guan, Penelope pileata Wagler, 1830 (E) VU
- Chestnut-bellied guan, Penelope ochrogaster Pelzeln, 1870 (E) VU
- White-browed guan, Penelope jacucaca Spix, 1825 (E) VU
- Blue-throated piping-guan, Pipile cumanensis (Jacquin, 1874)
- Red-throated piping-guan, Pipile cujubi (Pelzeln, 1858) VU
- Black-fronted piping-guan, Pipile jacutinga (Spix, 1825) EN
- Chaco chachalaca, Ortalis canicollis (Wagler, 1830)
- Speckled chachalaca, Ortalis guttata (Spix, 1825)
- East Brazilian chachalaca, Ortalis araucuan (Spix, 1825) (E)
- Scaled chachalaca, Ortalis squamata (Lesson, 1829) (E)
- Variable chachalaca, Ortalis motmot (Linnaeus, 1766)
- Chestnut-headed chachalaca, Ortalis ruficeps (Wagler, 1830) (E)
- Buff-browed chachalaca, Ortalis superciliaris Gray, GR, 1867 (E)
- Nocturnal curassow, Nothocrax urumutum (Spix, 1825)
- Black curassow, Crax alector Linnaeus, 1766
- Wattled curassow, Crax globulosa Spix, 1825 EN
- Bare-faced curassow, Crax fasciolata Spix, 1825
- Red-billed curassow, Crax blumenbachii Spix, 1825 (E) EN
- Crestless curassow, Mitu tomentosum (Spix, 1825)
- Razor-billed curassow, Mitu tuberosum (Spix, 1825) NT
- Alagoas curassow, Mitu mitu (Linnaeus, 1766) (E) EW
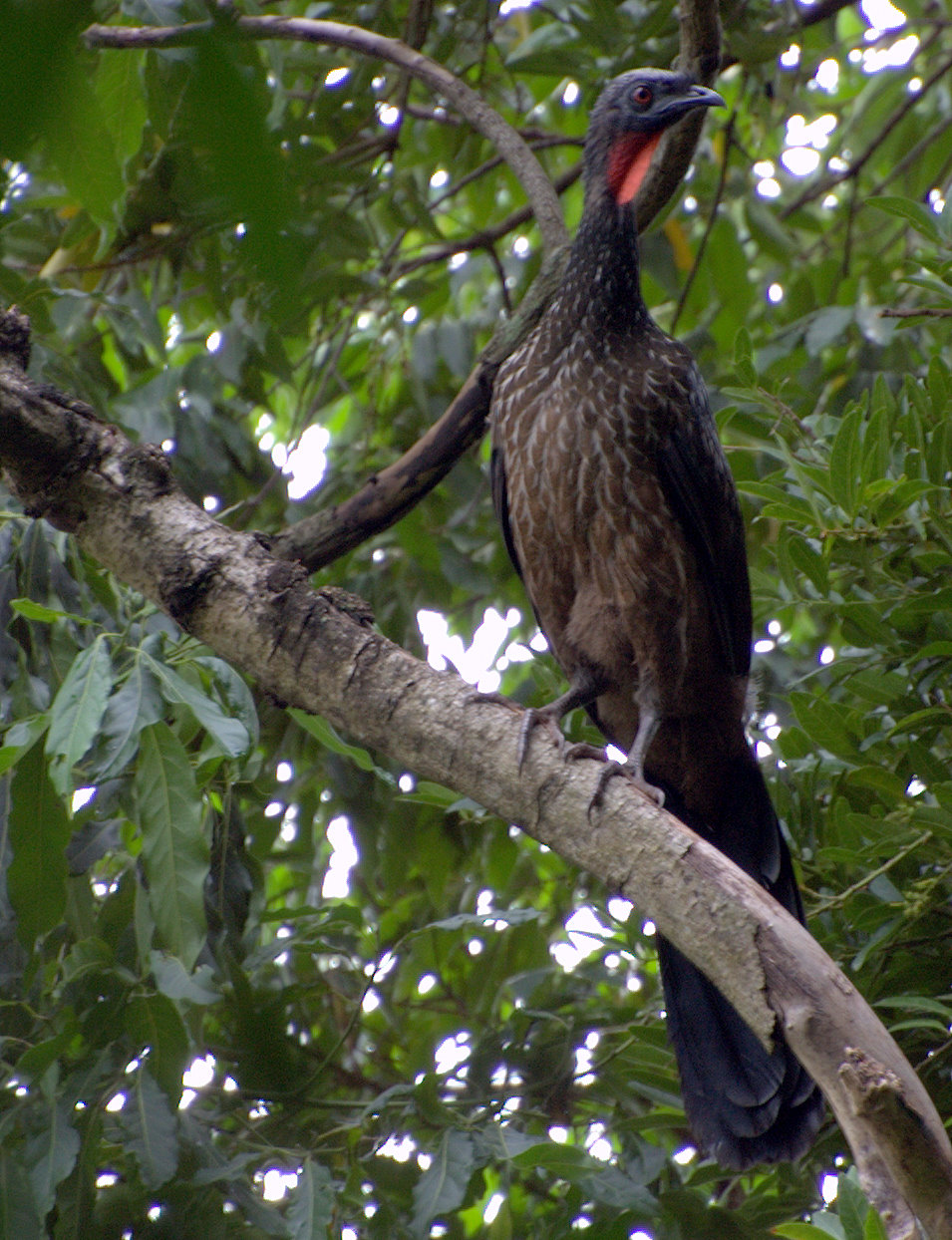
Dusky-legged guan

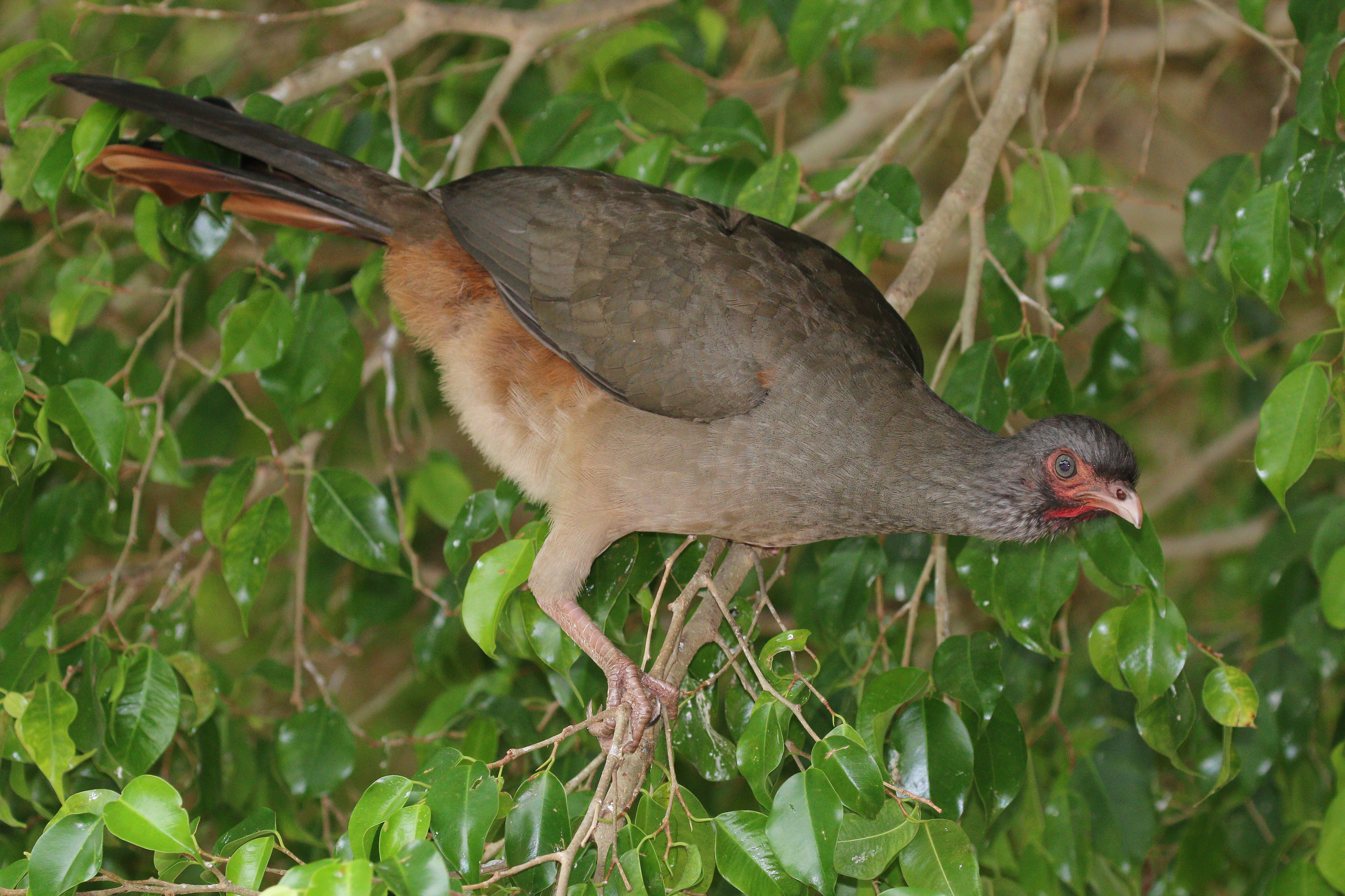
Chaco chachalaca

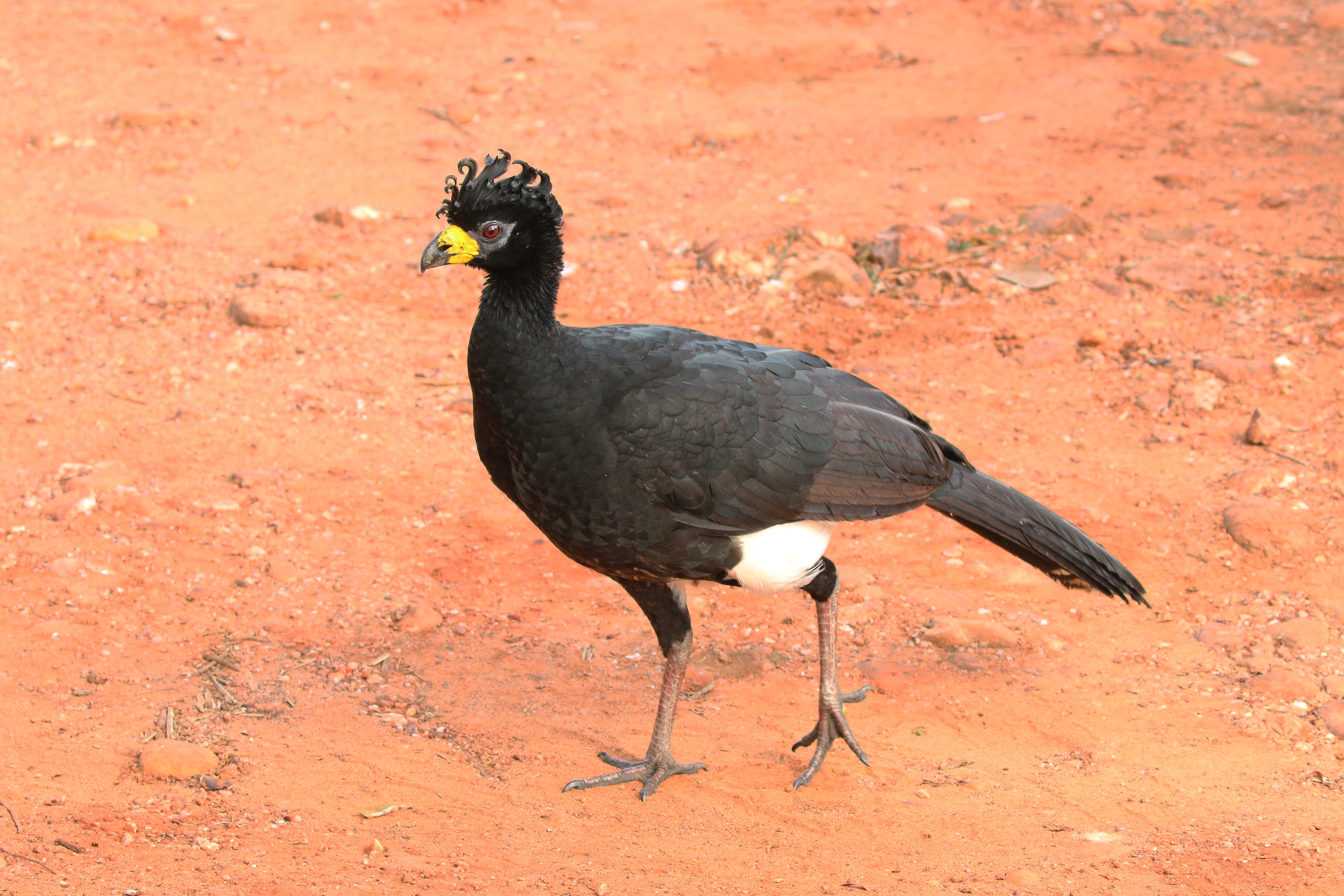
Bare-faced curassow

== New World quails ==
Order: Galliformes Family: Odontophoridae

The New World quails are small, plump terrestrial birds only distantly related to the quails of the Old World, but named for their similar appearance and habits.

- Crested bobwhite, Colinus cristatus (Linnaeus, 1766)
- Marbled wood-quail, Odontophorus gujanensis (Gmelin, JF, 1789)
- Spot-winged wood-quail, Odontophorus capueira (Spix, 1825)
- Starred wood-quail, Odontophorus stellatus (Gould, 1843)

== Flamingos ==
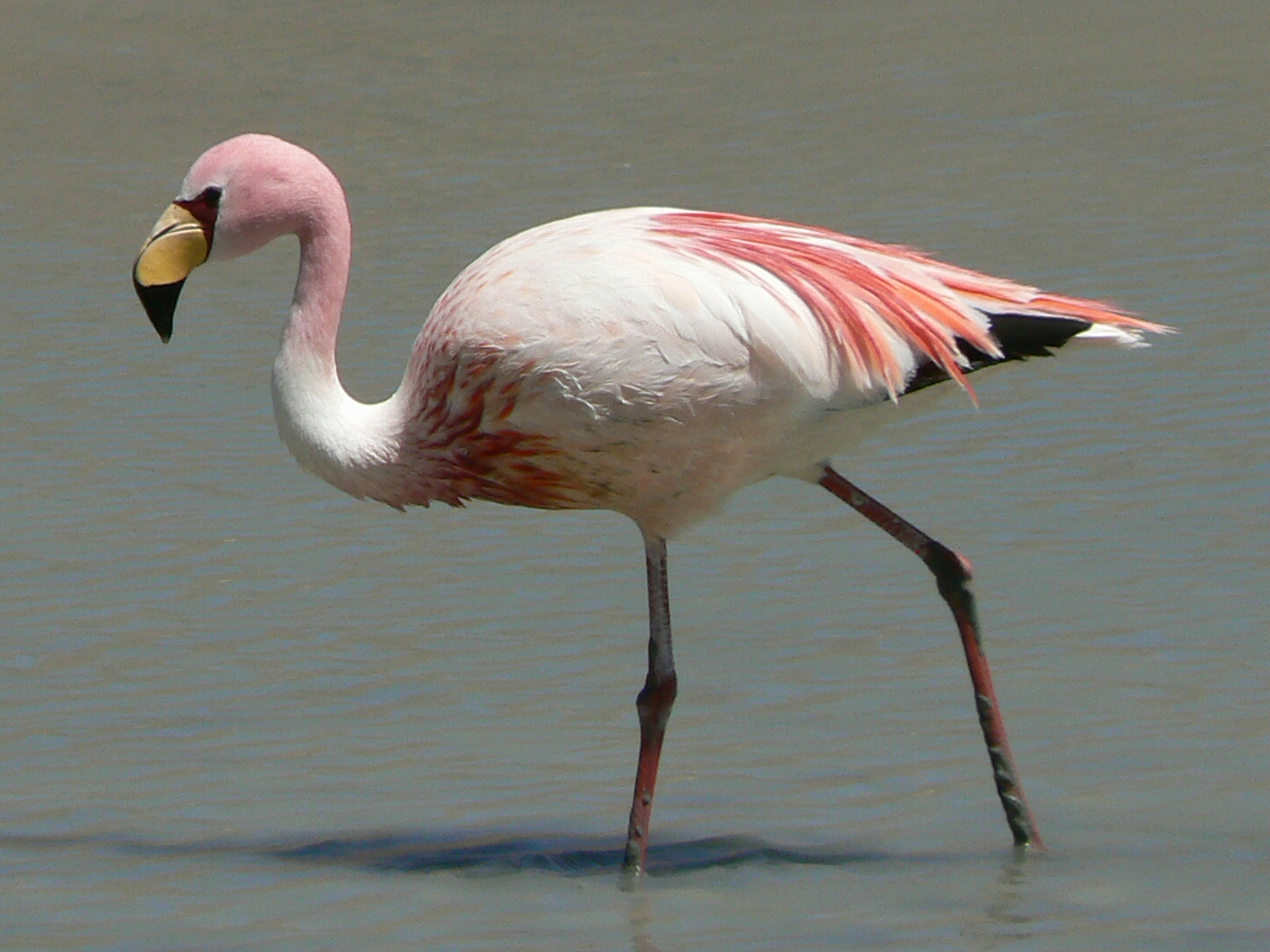
James's flamingo

Order: Phoenicopteriformes Family: Phoenicopteridae

Flamingos are gregarious wading birds, usually 1 to 1.5 metres (3 to 5 ft) tall, found in both the Western and Eastern Hemispheres. Flamingos filter-feed on shellfish and algae. Their oddly shaped beaks are specially adapted to separate mud and silt from the food they consume and, uniquely, are used upside-down.

- Chilean flamingo, Phoenicopterus chilensis Molina, 1782 NT
- American flamingo, Phoenicopterus ruber Linnaeus, 1758
- Greater flamingo, Phoenicopterus roseus Pallas, 1811 (UC)(V)
- Andean flamingo, Phoenicoparrus andinus (Philippi, 1854) (V) VU
- James's flamingo, Phoenicoparrus jamesi (Sclater, PL, 1886) (V) NT

== Grebes ==
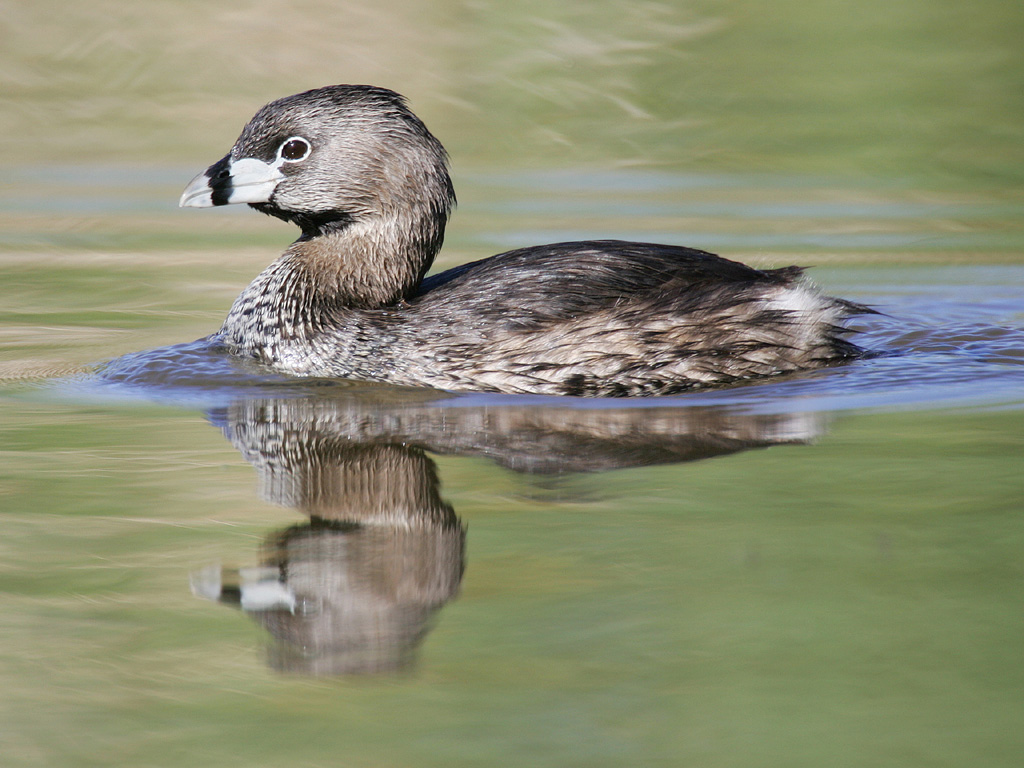
Pied-billed grebe

Order: Podicipediformes Family: Podicipedidae

Grebes are small to medium-large freshwater diving birds. They have lobed toes and are excellent swimmers and divers. However, they have their feet placed far back on the body, making them quite ungainly on land.

- White-tufted grebe, Rollandia rolland (Gaimard, 1823)
- Least grebe, Tachybaptus dominicus (Linnaeus, 1766)
- Pied-billed grebe, Podilymbus podiceps (Linnaeus, 1758)
- Great grebe, Podiceps major (Boddaert, 1783)
- Silvery grebe, Podiceps occipitalis Garnot, 1826

== Pigeons ==
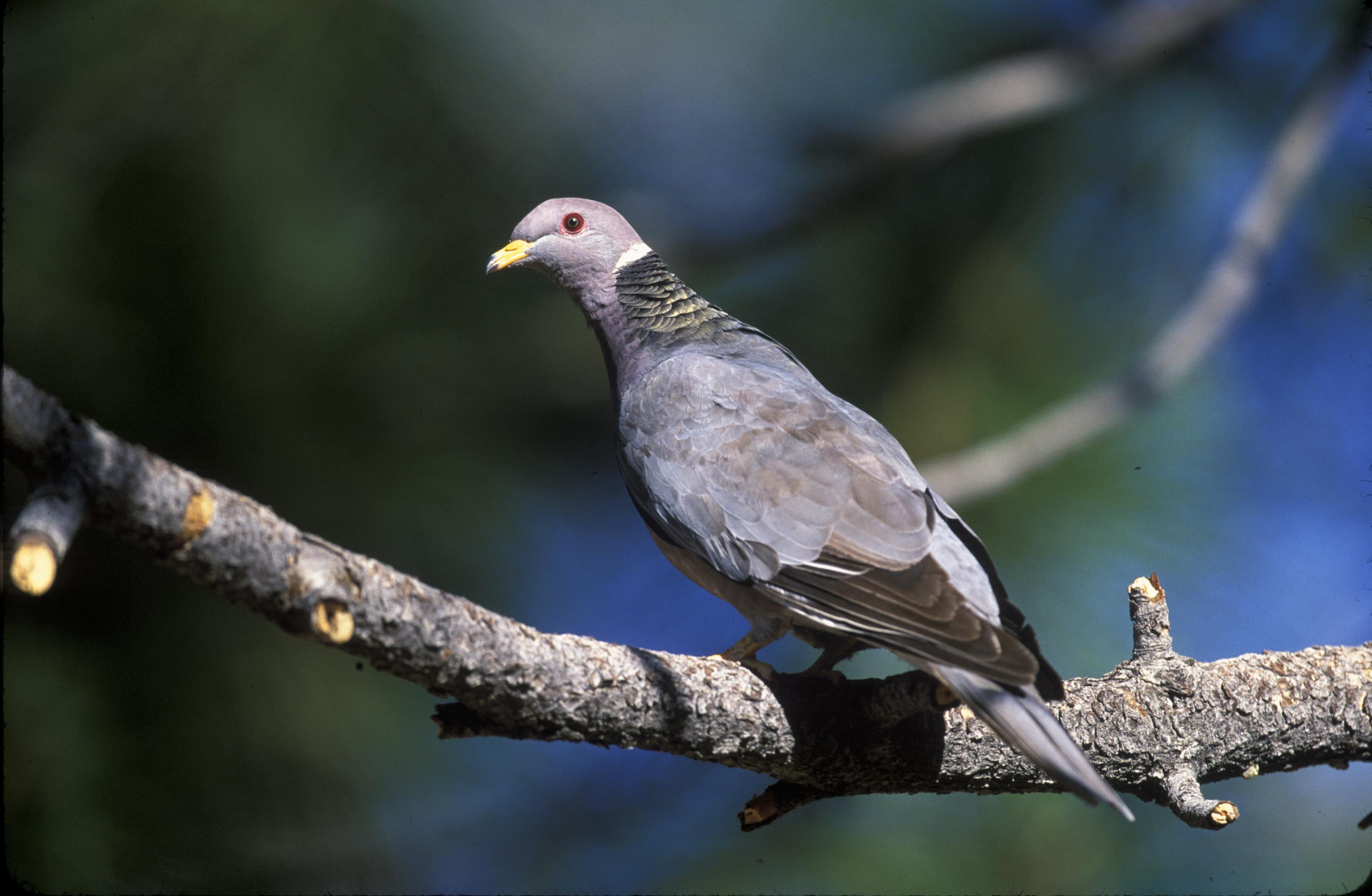
Band-tailed pigeon

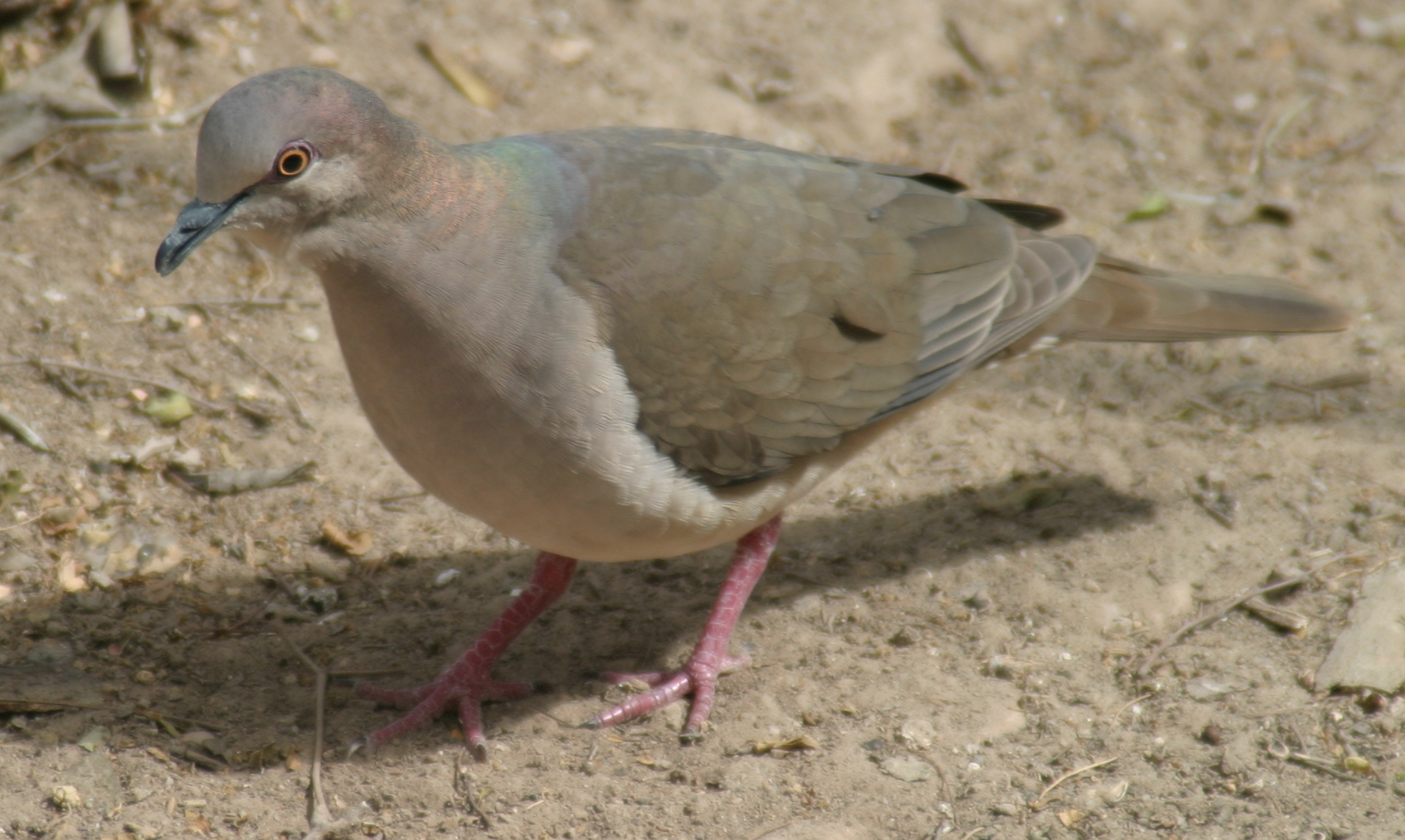
White-tipped dove

Order: Columbiformes Family: Columbidae

Pigeons and doves are stout-bodied birds with short necks and short slender bills with a fleshy cere.

- Rock pigeon, Columba livia Gmelin, JF, 1789 (I)
- Scaled pigeon, Patagioenas speciosa (Gmelin, JF, 1789)
- Picazuro pigeon, Patagioenas picazuro (Temminck, 1813)
- Spot-winged pigeon, Patagioenas maculosa (Temminck, 1813)
- Band-tailed pigeon, Patagioenas fasciata (Say, 1822)
- Pale-vented pigeon, Patagioenas cayennensis (Bonnaterre, 1792)
- Plumbeous pigeon, Patagioenas plumbea (Vieillot, 1818)
- Ruddy pigeon, Patagioenas subvinacea (Lawrence, 1868)
- Sapphire quail-dove, Geotrygon saphirina Bonaparte, 1855
- Ruddy quail-dove, Geotrygon montana (Linnaeus, 1758)
- Violaceous quail-dove, Geotrygon violacea (Temminck, 1809)
- White-tipped dove, Leptotila verreauxi Bonaparte, 1855
- Gray-fronted dove, Leptotila rufaxilla (Richard & Bernard, 1792)
- Eared dove, Zenaida auriculata (Des Murs, 1847)
- Blue ground dove, Claravis pretiosa (Ferrari-Pérez, 1886)
- Long-tailed ground dove, Uropelia campestris (Spix, 1825)
- Purple-winged ground dove, Paraclaravis geoffroyi (Temminck, 1811) CR
- Common ground dove, Columbina passerina (Linnaeus, 1758)
- Plain-breasted ground dove, Columbina minuta (Linnaeus, 1766)
- Ruddy ground dove, Columbina talpacoti (Temminck, 1810)
- Scaled dove, Columbina squammata (Lesson, 1831)
- Picui ground dove, Columbina picui (Temminck, 1813)
- Blue-eyed ground dove, Columbina cyanopis (Pelzeln, 1870) (E) CR

== Cuckoos ==
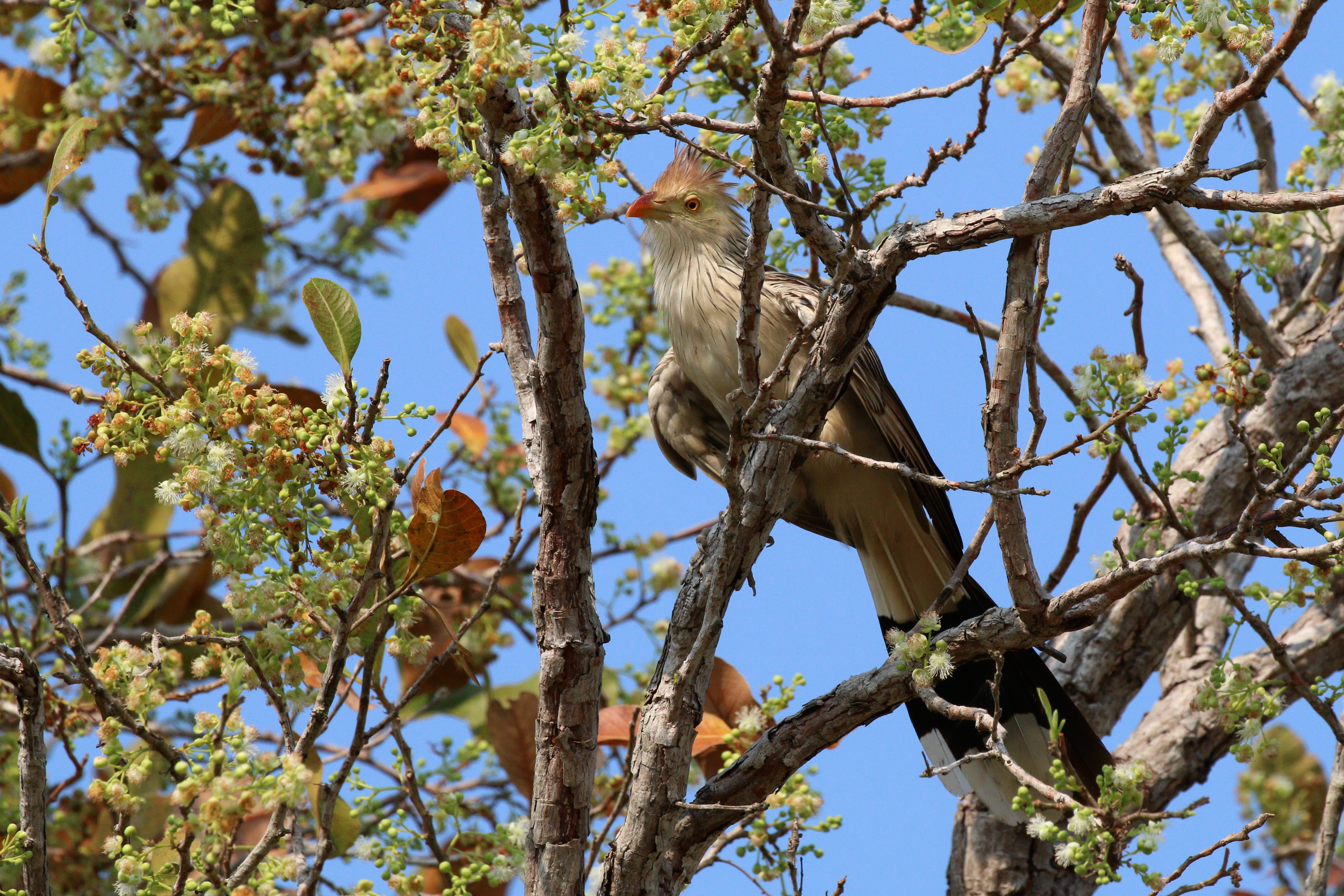
Guira cuckoo

Order: Cuculiformes Family: Cuculidae

The family Cuculidae includes cuckoos, roadrunners, and anis. These birds are of variable size with slender bodies, long tails and strong legs.

- Guira cuckoo, Guira guira (Gmelin, JF, 1788)
- Greater ani, Crotophaga major Gmelin, JF, 1788
- Smooth-billed ani, Crotophaga ani Linnaeus, 1758
- Striped cuckoo, Tapera naevia (Linnaeus, 1766)
- Pheasant cuckoo, Dromococcyx phasianellus (Spix, 1824)
- Pavonine cuckoo, Dromococcyx pavoninus Pelzeln, 1870
- Rufous-vented ground-cuckoo, Neomorphus geoffroyi (Temminck, 1820) VU
- Scaled ground-cuckoo, Neomorphus squamiger Todd, 1925 (E)
- Rufous-winged ground-cuckoo, Neomorphus rufipennis (Gray, GR, 1849)
- Red-billed ground-cuckoo, Neomorphus pucheranii (Deville, 1851)
- Little cuckoo, Coccycua minuta (Vieillot, 1817)
- Dwarf cuckoo, Coccycua pumila (Strickland, 1852) (U)
- Ash-colored cuckoo, Coccycua cinerea (Vieillot, 1817)
- Squirrel cuckoo, Piaya cayana (Linnaeus, 1766)
- Black-bellied cuckoo, Piaya melanogaster (Vieillot, 1817)
- Dark-billed cuckoo, Coccyzus melacoryphus Vieillot, 1817
- Yellow-billed cuckoo, Coccyzus americanus (Linnaeus, 1758)
- Pearly-breasted cuckoo, Coccyzus euleri Cabanis, 1873
- Mangrove cuckoo, Coccyzus minor (Gmelin, JF, 1788)
- Black-billed cuckoo, Coccyzus erythropthalmus (Wilson, 1811) (V)
- Common cuckoo, Cuculus canorus Linnaeus, 1758 (V)

== Oilbird ==
Order: Steatornithiformes Family: Steatornithidae

The oilbird is a slim, long-winged bird related to the nightjars. It is nocturnal and a specialist feeder on the fruit of the oil palm.

- Oilbird, Steatornis caripensis Humboldt, 1817

== Potoos ==
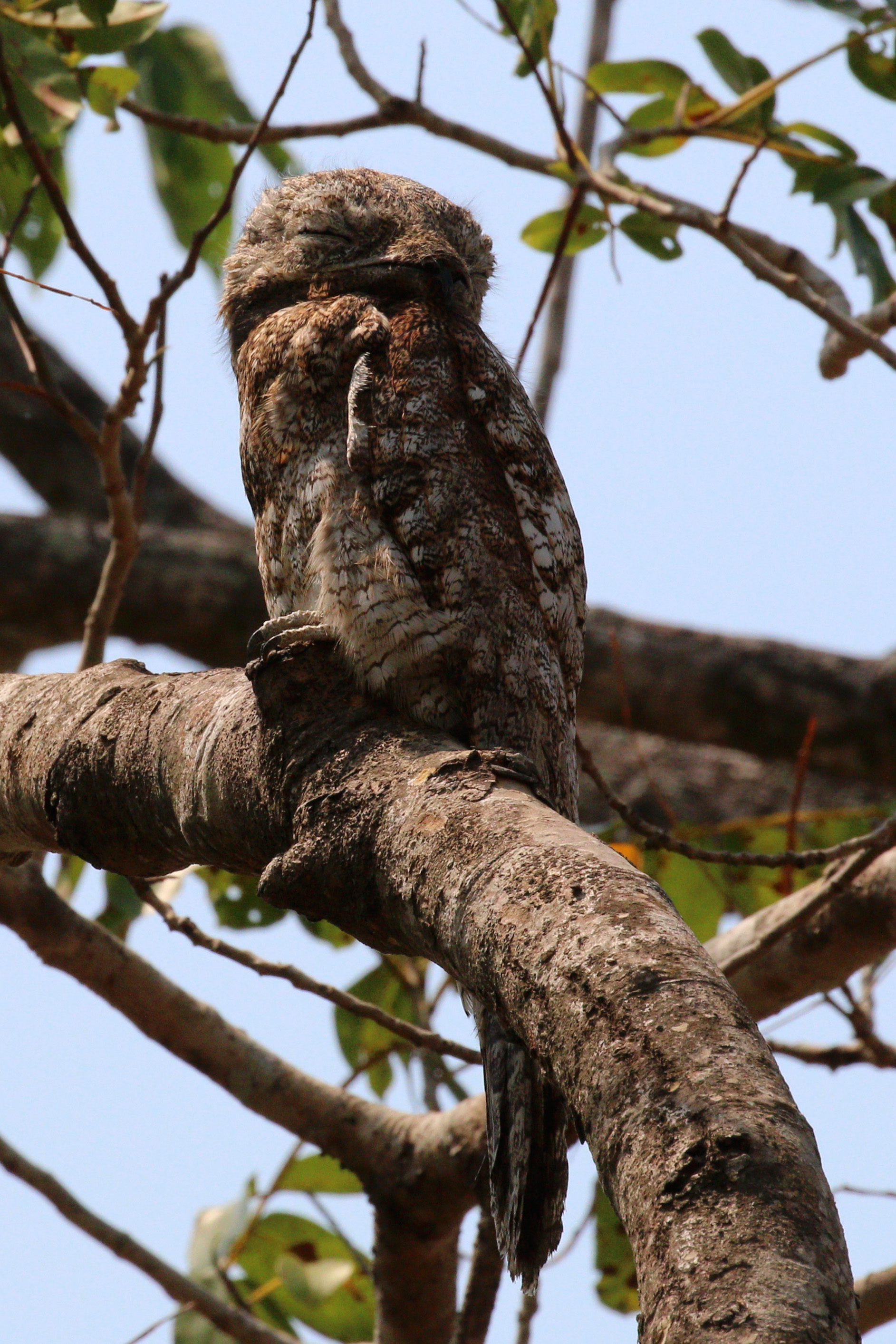
Great potoo

Order: Nyctibiiformes Family: Nyctibiidae

The potoos (sometimes called poor-me-ones) are large birds related to the nightjars and frogmouths. They are nocturnal insectivores which lack the bristles around the mouth found in the true nightjars.

- Rufous potoo, Phyllaemulor bracteatus (Gould, 1846)
- Great potoo, Nyctibius grandis (Gmelin, JF, 1789)
- Long-tailed potoo, Nyctibius aethereus (Wied, 1820)
- Common potoo, Nyctibius griseus (Gmelin, JF, 1789)
- White-winged potoo, Nyctibius leucopterus (Wied, 1821)

== Nightjars ==
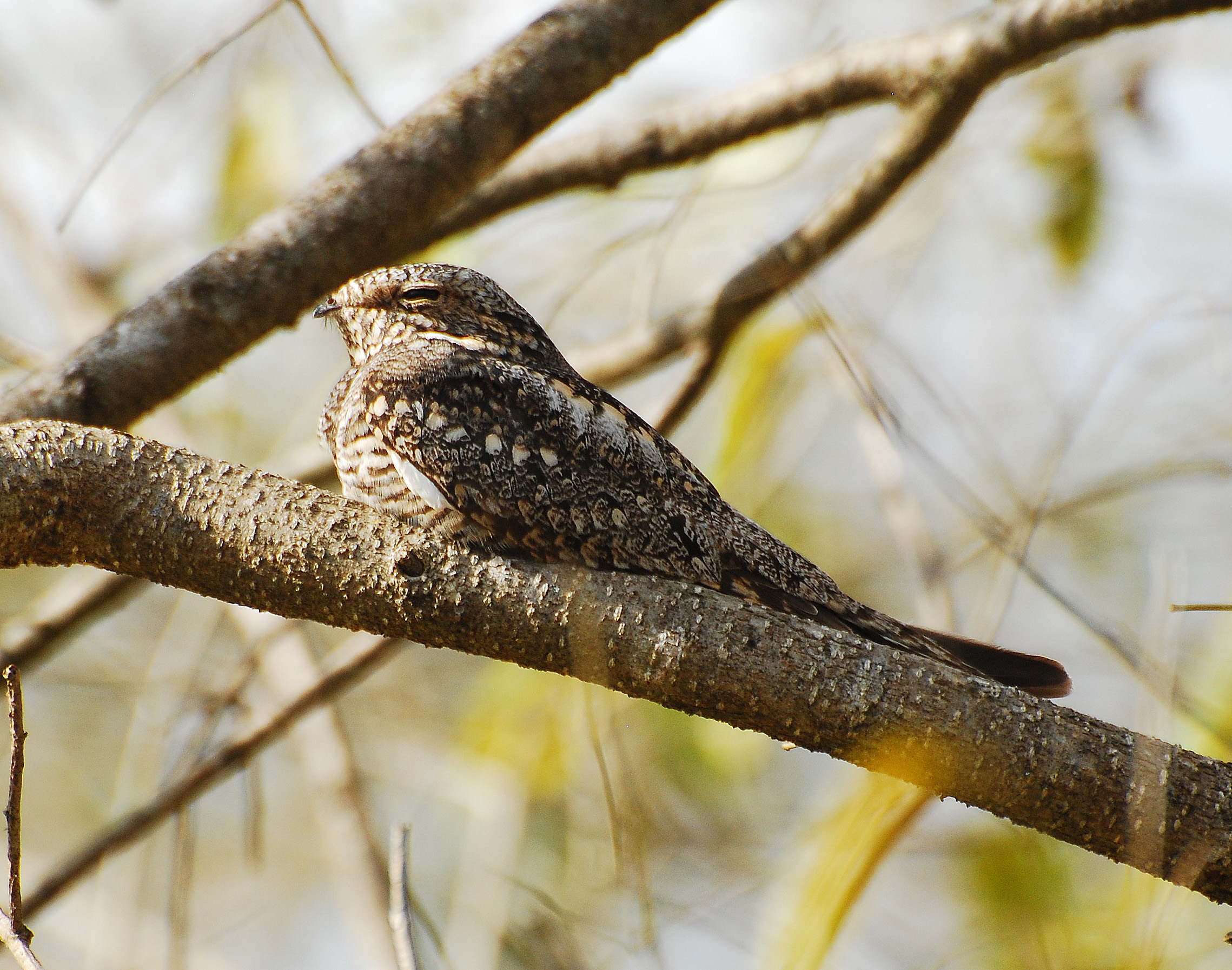
Lesser nighthawk

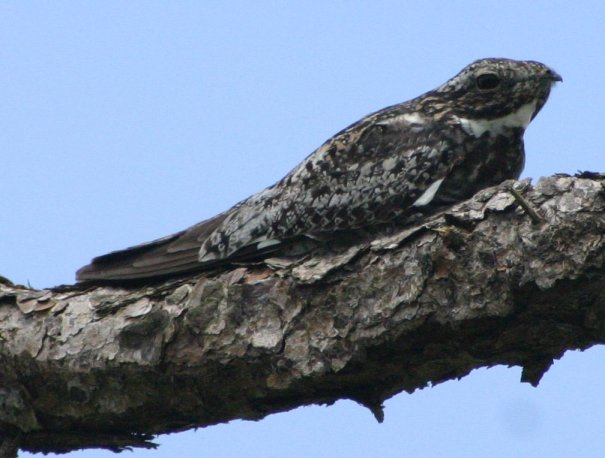
Common nighthawk

Order: Caprimulgiformes Family: Caprimulgidae

Nightjars are medium-sized nocturnal birds that usually nest on the ground. They have long wings, short legs, and very short bills. Most have small feet, of little use for walking, and long pointed wings. Their soft plumage is camouflaged to resemble bark or leaves.

- Nacunda nighthawk, Chordeiles nacunda (Vieillot, 1817)
- Least nighthawk, Chordeiles pusillus Gould, 1861
- Sand-colored nighthawk, Chordeiles rupestris (Spix, 1825)
- Lesser nighthawk, Chordeiles acutipennis (Hermann, 1783)
- Common nighthawk, Chordeiles minor (Forster, JR, 1771)
- Antillean nighthawk, Chordeiles gundlachii Lawrence, 1857 (V)
- Band-tailed nighthawk, Nyctiprogne leucopyga (Spix, 1825) (see note) (Note: The SACC has split Nyctiprogne atifascia from Nyctiprogne leucopyga (Proposal 673) but has not assigned English names, so the proposal has not been implemented and the counts do not reflect the change.)
- Bahian nighthawk, Nyctiprogne vielliardi (Lencioni-Neto, 1994) (E)
- Short-tailed nighthawk, Lurocalis semitorquatus (Gmelin, JF, 1789)
- Blackish nightjar, Nyctipolus nigrescens (Cabanis, 1849)
- Pygmy nightjar, Nyctipolus hirundinaceus (Spix, 1825) (E)
- Common pauraque, Nyctidromus albicollis (Gmelin, JF, 1789)
- Roraiman nightjar, Tepuiornis whitelyi (Salvin, 1885)
- Todd's nightjar, Setopagis heterura Todd, 1915
- Little nightjar, Setopagis parvula (Gould, 1837)
- White-tailed nightjar, Hydropsalis cayennensis (Gmelin, JF, 1789)
- Spot-tailed nightjar, Hydropsalis maculicaudus (Lawrence, 1862)
- Long-trained nightjar, Hydropsalis forcipata (Nitzsch, 1840)
- Ladder-tailed nightjar, Hydropsalis climacocerca (Tschudi, 1844)
- Scissor-tailed nightjar, Hydropsalis torquata (Gmelin, JF, 1789)
- Band-winged nightjar, Systellura longirostris (Bonaparte, 1825)
- White-winged nightjar, Eleothreptus candicans (Pelzeln, 1867) VU
- Sickle-winged nightjar, Eleothreptus anomalus (Gould, 1838) VU
- Ocellated poorwill, Nyctiphrynus ocellatus (Tschudi, 1844)
- Silky-tailed nightjar, Antrostous sericocaudatus (Cassin, 1849)
- Rufous nightjar, Antrostomus rufus (Boddaert, 1783)

== Swifts ==
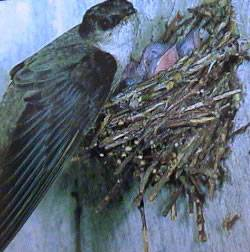
Chimney swift

Order: Apodiformes Family: Apodidae

Swifts are small birds which spend the majority of their lives flying. These birds have very short legs and never settle voluntarily on the ground, perching instead only on vertical surfaces. Many swifts have long swept-back wings which resemble a crescent or boomerang.

- White-chinned swift, Cypseloides cryptus Zimmer, 1945
- Black swift, Cypseloides niger (Gmelin, JF, 1789) VU
- White-chested swift, Cypseloides lemosi Eisenmann & Lehmann, 1962 (U)
- Sooty swift, Cypseloides fumigatus (Streubel, 1848)
- Great dusky swift, Cypseloides senex (Temminck, 1826)
- Tepui swift, Streptoprocne phelpsi (Collins, 1972)
- White-collared swift, Streptoprocne zonaris (Shaw, 1796)
- Biscutate swift, Streptoprocne biscutata (Sclater, PL, 1866)
- Gray-rumped swift, Chaetura cinereiventris Sclater, PL, 1862
- Band-rumped swift, Chaetura spinicaudus (Temminck, 1839)
- Pale-rumped swift, Chaetura egregia Todd, 1916
- Chimney swift, Chaetura pelagica (Linnaeus, 1758) VU
- Chapman's swift, Chaetura chapmani Hellmayr, 1907
- Sick's swift, Chaetura meridionalis Hellmayr, 1907
- Short-tailed swift, Chaetura brachyura (Jardine, 1846)
- White-tipped swift, Aeronautes montivagus (d'Orbigny & Lafresnaye, 1837)
- Common swift, Apus apus (Linnaeus, 1758) (UC)(V)
- Alpine swift, Tachymarptis melba (Linnaeus, 1758) (UC)(V)
- Fork-tailed palm-swift, Tachornis squamata (Cassin, 1853)
- Lesser swallow-tailed swift, Panyptila cayennensis (Gmelin, JF, 1789)

== Hummingbirds ==
Order: Apodiformes Family: Trochilidae

Hummingbirds are small birds capable of hovering in mid-air due to the rapid flapping of their wings. They are the only birds that can fly backwards.

- Crimson topaz, Topaza pella (Linnaeus, 1758)
- Fiery topaz, Topaza pyra (Gould, 1846)
- White-necked jacobin, Florisuga mellivora (Linnaeus, 1758)
- Black jacobin, Florisuga fusca (Vieillot, 1817)
- Saw-billed hermit, Ramphodon naevius (Dumont, 1818) (E)
- Hook-billed hermit, Glaucis dohrnii (Bourcier & Mulsant, 1852) (E) VU
- Rufous-breasted hermit, Glaucis hirsutus (Gmelin, JF, 1788)
- Pale-tailed barbthroat, Threnetes leucurus (Linnaeus, 1766)
- Sooty barbthroat, Threnetes niger (Linnaeus, 1758)
- Broad-tipped hermit, Anopetia gounellei (Boucard, 1891) (E)
- Dusky-throated hermit, Phaethornis squalidus (Temminck, 1822) (E)
- Streak-throated hermit, Phaethornis rupurumii Boucard, 1892
- Tapajos hermit, Phaethornis aethopygus Zimmer, 1950 (E) VU
- Minute hermit, Phaethornis idaliae (Bourcier & Mulsant, 1856) (E)
- Cinnamon-throated hermit, Phaethornis nattereri Berlepsch, 1887
- Gray-chinned hermit, Phaethornis griseogularis Gould, 1851
- Reddish hermit, Phaethornis ruber (Linnaeus, 1758)
- Buff-bellied hermit, Phaethornis subochraceus Todd, 1915
- Sooty-capped hermit, Phaethornis augusti (Bourcier, 1847)
- Planalto hermit, Phaethornis pretrei (Lesson & Delattre, 1839)
- Scale-throated hermit, Phaethornis eurynome (Lesson, 1832)
- White-bearded hermit, Phaethornis hispidus (Gould, 1846)
- Needle-billed hermit, Phaethornis philippii (Bourcier, 1847)
- Straight-billed hermit, Phaethornis bourcieri (Lesson, 1832)
- Long-tailed hermit, Phaethornis superciliosus (Linnaeus, 1766)
- Great-billed hermit, Phaethornis malaris (Nordmann, 1835)
- Blue-fronted lancebill, Doryfera johannae (Bourcier, 1847)
- Hyacinth visorbearer, Augastes scutatus (Temminck, 1824) (E)
- Hooded visorbearer, Augastes lumachella (Lesson, 1839) (E) NT
- Brown violetear, Colibri delphinae (Lesson, 1839)
- Sparkling violetear, Colibri coruscans (Gould, 1846)
- White-vented violetear, Colibri serrirostris (Vieillot, 1816)
- Horned sungem, Heliactin bilophus (Temminck, 1820)
- Black-eared fairy, Heliothryx auritus (Gmelin, JF, 1788)
- White-tailed goldenthroat, Polytmus guainumbi (Pallas, 1764)
- Green-tailed goldenthroat, Polytmus theresiae (Silva Maia, 1843)
- Fiery-tailed awlbill, Avocettula recurvirostris (Swainson, 1822)
- Ruby-topaz hummingbird, Chrysolampis mosquitus (Linnaeus, 1758)
- Green-throated mango, Anthracothorax viridigula (Boddaert, 1783)
- Black-throated mango, Anthracothorax nigricollis (Vieillot, 1817)
- Black-bellied thorntail, Discosura langsdorffi (Temminck, 1821)
- Racket-tipped thorntail, Discosura longicaudus (Gmelin, JF, 1788)
- Tufted coquette, Lophornis ornatus (Boddaert, 1783)
- Dot-eared coquette, Lophornis gouldii (Lesson, 1832) NT
- Frilled coquette, Lophornis magnificus (Vieillot, 1817) (E)
- Spangled coquette, Lophornis stictolophus Salvin & Elliot, 1873
- Butterfly coquette, Lophornis verreauxii Bourcier, 1853
- Festive coquette, Lophornis chalybeus (Temminck, 1821) (E)
- Peacock coquette, Lophornis pavoninus Salvin & Godman, 1882
- Velvet-browed brilliant, Heliodoxa xanthogonys Salvin & Godman, 1882
- Black-throated brilliant, Heliodoxa schreibersii (Bourcier, 1847)
- Gould's jewelfront, Heliodoxa aurescens (Gould, 1846)
- Brazilian ruby, Heliodoxa rubricauda (Boddaert, 1783) (E)
- Long-billed starthroat, Heliomaster longirostris (Audebert & Vieillot, 1801)
- Stripe-breasted starthroat, Heliomaster squamosus (Temminck, 1823) (E)
- Blue-tufted starthroat, Heliomaster furcifer (Shaw, 1812)
- Amethyst woodstar, Calliphlox amethystina (Boddaert, 1783)
- Blue-tailed emerald, Chlorostilbon mellisugus (Linnaeus, 1758)
- Glittering-bellied emerald, Chlorostilbon lucidus (Shaw, 1812)
- Blue-chinned sapphire, Chlorestes notata (Reich, 1793)
- Green-crowned plovercrest, Stephanoxis lalandi (Vieillot, 1818) (E)
- Purple-crowned plovercrest, Stephanoxis loddigesii (Vigors, 1831)
- Gray-breasted sabrewing, Campylopterus largipennis (Boddaert, 1783)
- Outcrop sabrewing, Campylopterus calcirupicola Lopes, Vasconcelos, & Gonzaga, 2017 (E) VU
- Diamantina sabrewing, Campylopterus diamantinensis Ruschi, 1963 (E) NT
- Rufous-breasted sabrewing, Campylopterus hyperythrus Cabanis, 1849
- Buff-breasted sabrewing, Campylopterus duidae Chapman, 1929
- Fork-tailed woodnymph, Thalurania furcata (Gmelin, JF, 1788)
- Long-tailed woodnymph, Thalurania watertonii (Bourcier, 1847) (E) EN
- Violet-capped woodnymph, Thalurania glaucopis (Gmelin, JF, 1788)
- Swallow-tailed hummingbird, Eupetomena macroura (Gmelin, JF, 1788)
- Sombre hummingbird, Eupetomena cirrochloris (Vieillot, 1818) (E)
- Olive-spotted hummingbird, Talaphorus chlorocercus (Gould, 1866)
- Green-bellied hummingbird, Saucerottia viridigaster (Bourcier, 1843)
- Versicolored emerald, Chrysuronia versicolor (Vieillot, 1818)
- Golden-tailed sapphire, Chrysuronia oenone (Lesson, 1832)
- White-chested emerald, Chrysuronia brevirostris (Lesson, 1829)
- Plain-bellied emerald, Chrysuronia leucogaster (Gmelin, JF, 1788)
- White-throated hummingbird, Leucochloris albicollis (Vieillot, 1818)
- Glittering-throated emerald, Chionomesa fimbriata (Gmelin, JF, 1788)
- Sapphire-spangled emerald, Chionomesa lactea (Lesson, 1832)
- Rufous-throated sapphire, Hylocharis sapphirina (Gmelin, JF, 1788)
- Gilded hummingbird, Hylocharis chrysura (Shaw, 1812)
- White-bellied hummingbird, Elliotomyia chionogaster (Tschudi, 1846)
- White-chinned sapphire, Chlorestes cyanus (Vieillot, 1818)
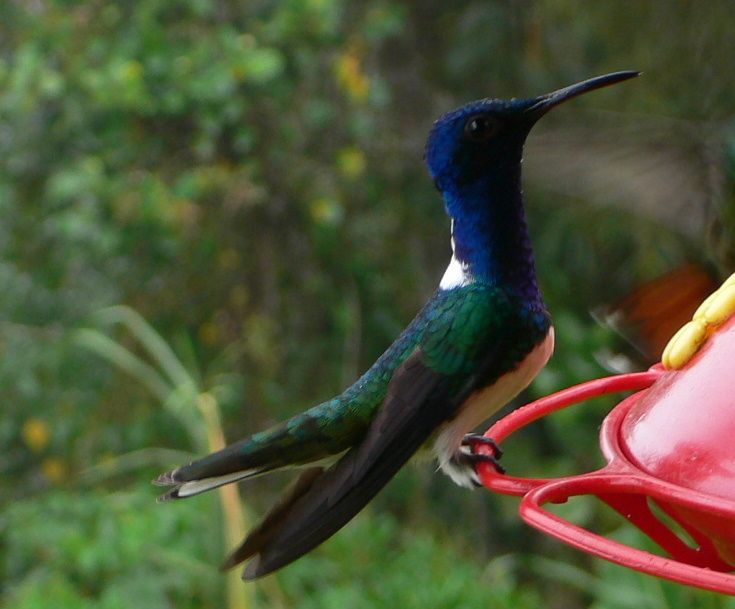
White-necked jacobin

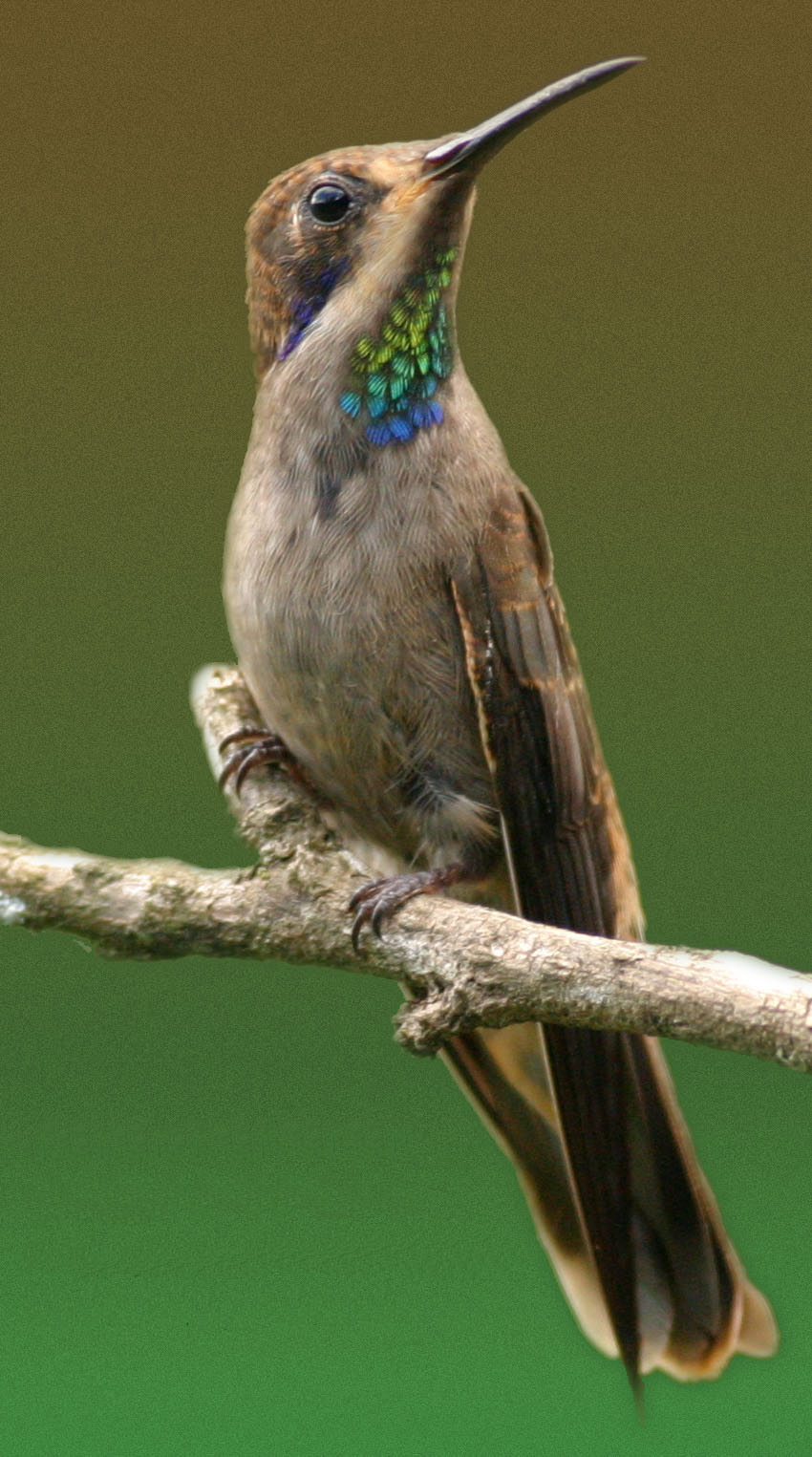
Brown violetear

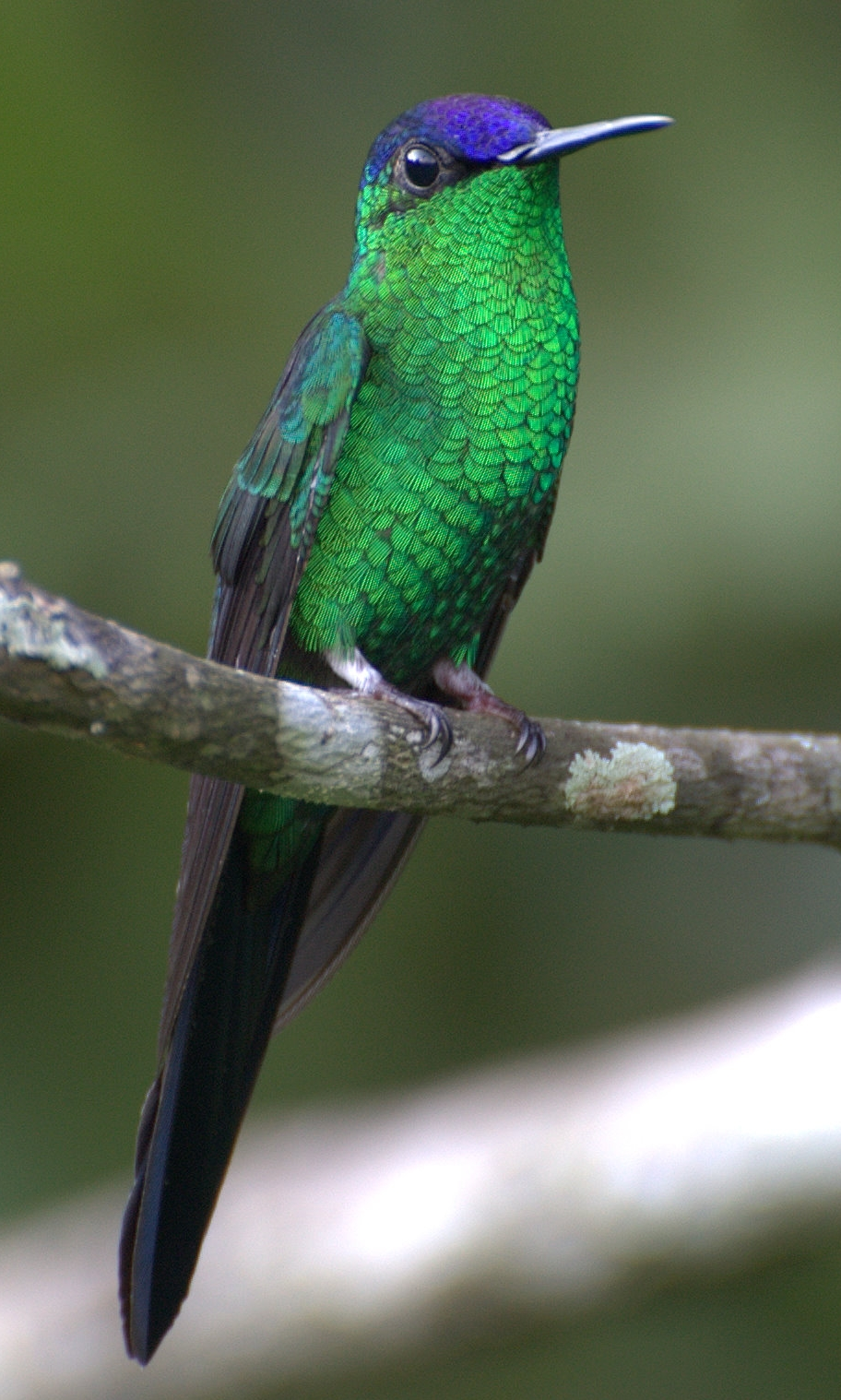
Violet-capped woodnymph

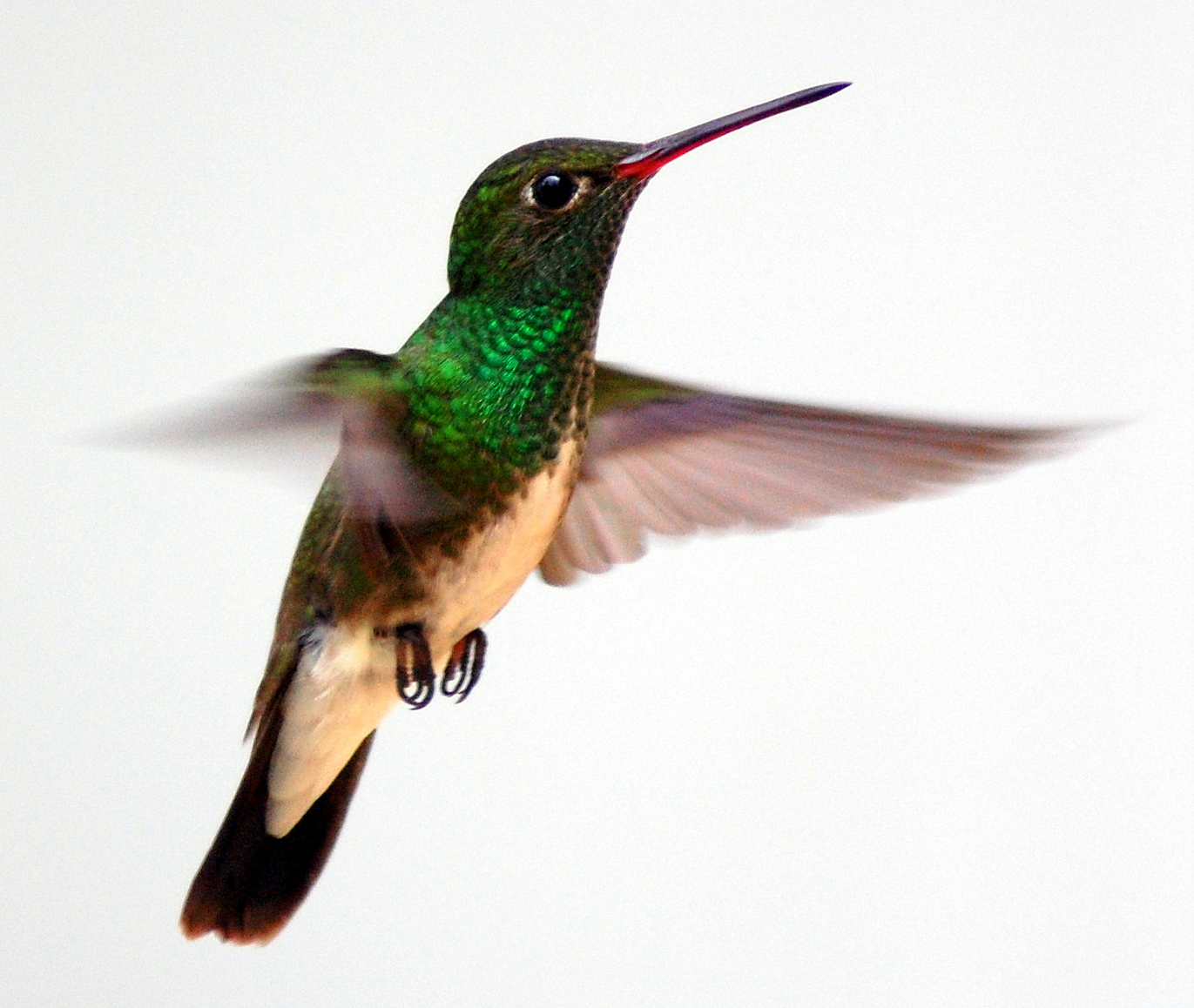
Glittering-throated emerald

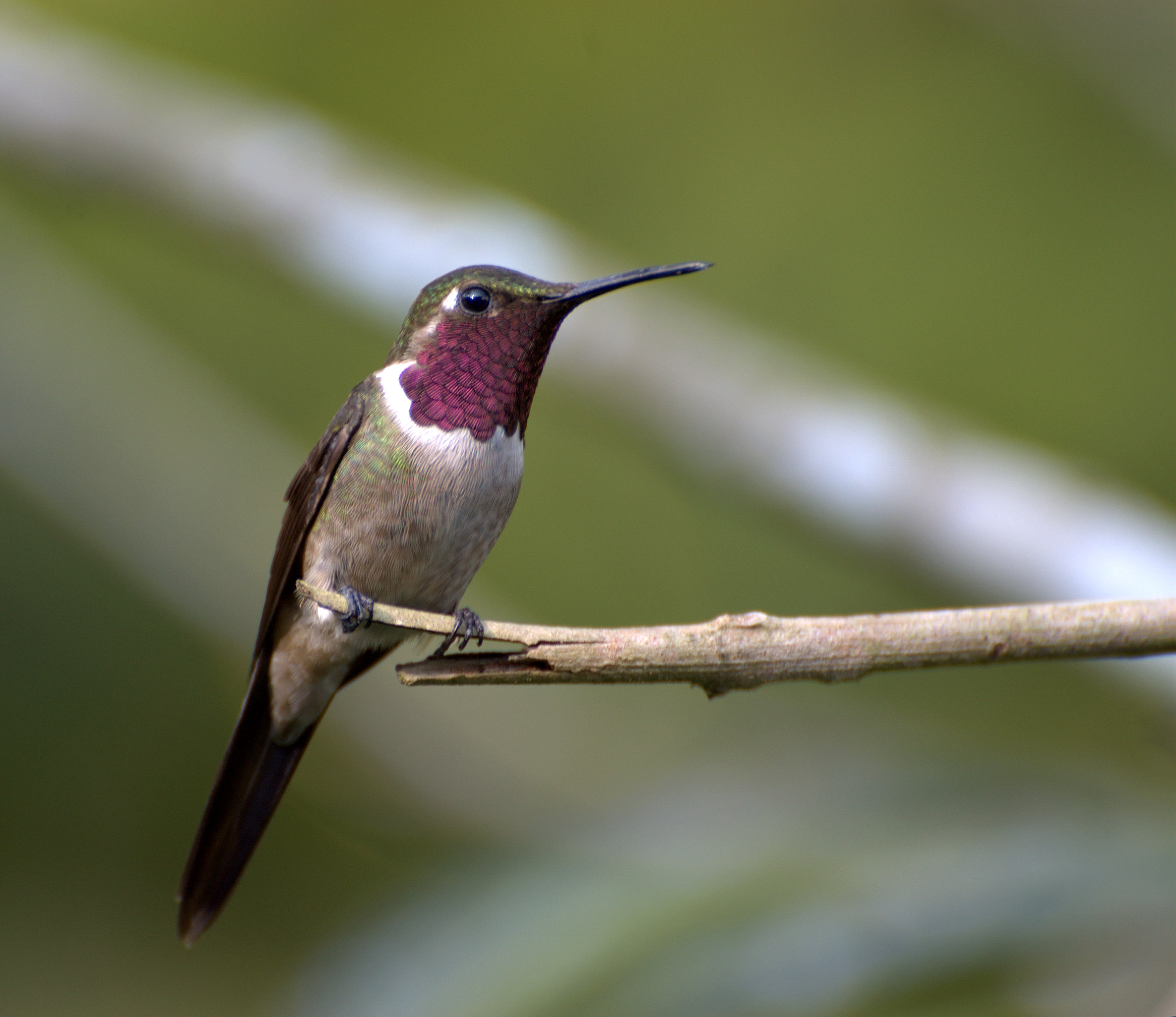
Amethyst woodstar

== Hoatzin ==
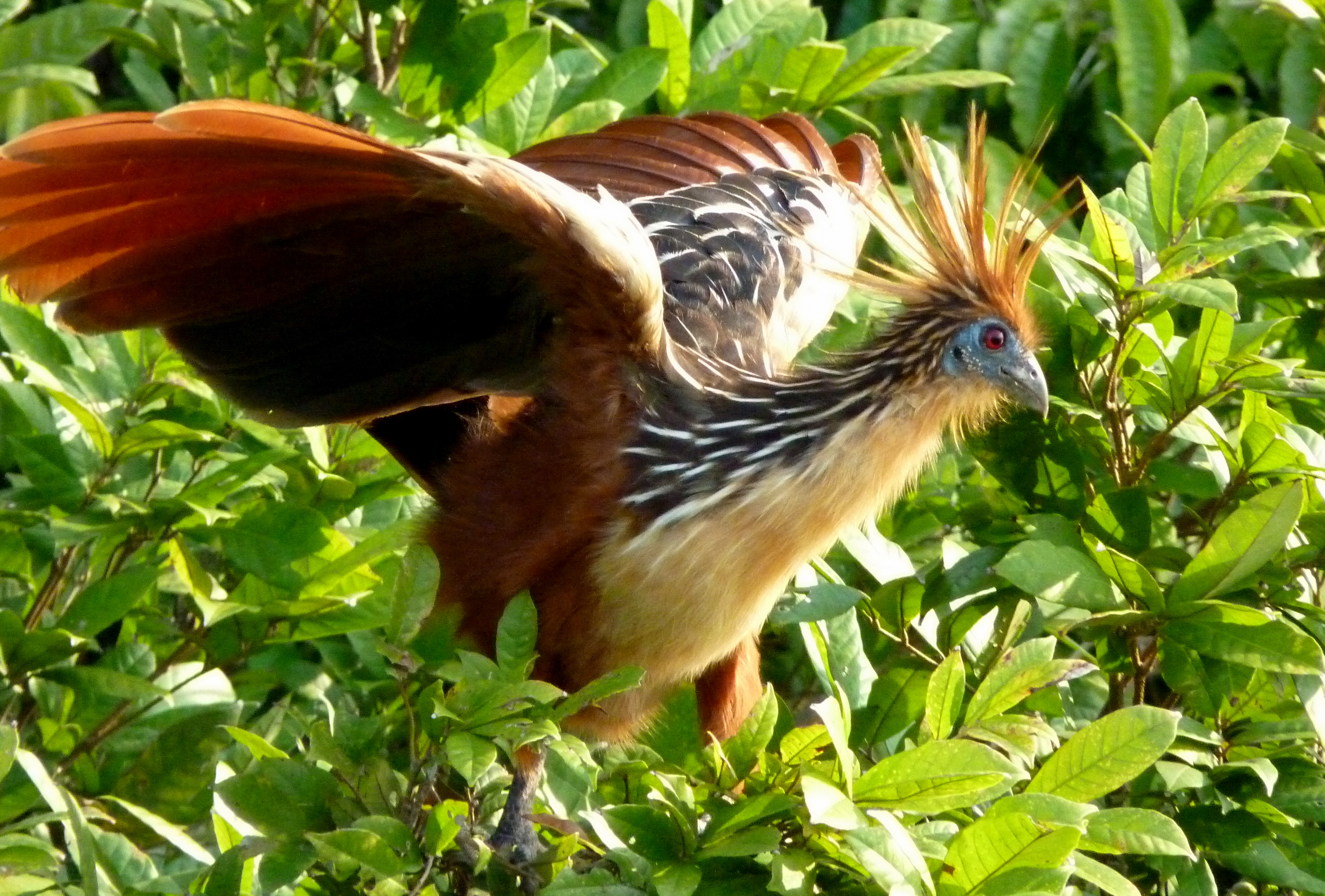
Hoatzin

Order: Opisthocomiformes Family: Opisthocomidae

The hoatzin is pheasant-sized, but much slimmer. It has a long tail and neck, but a small head with an unfeathered blue face and red eyes which are topped by a spiky crest. It is a weak flier which is found in the swamps of the Amazon and Orinoco rivers.

- Hoatzin, Opisthocomus hoazin (Müller, PLS, 1776)

== Limpkin ==
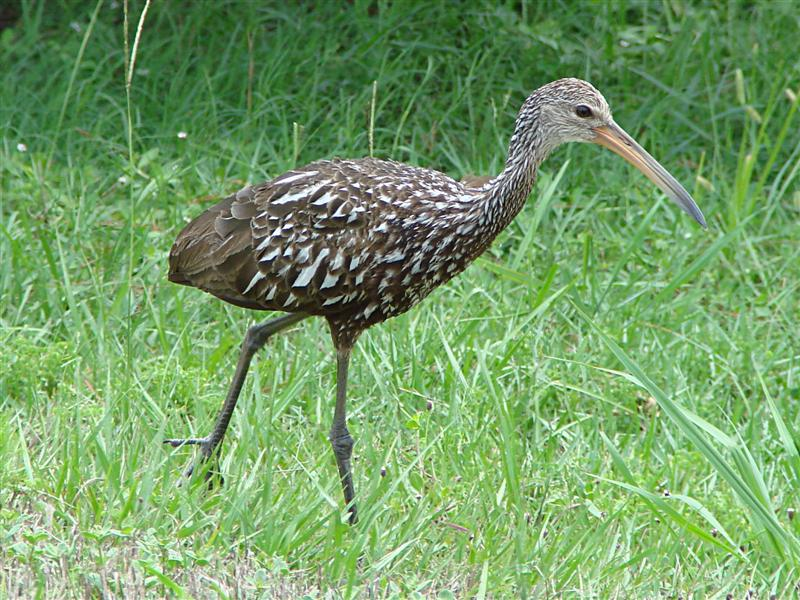
Limpkin

Order: Gruiformes Family: Aramidae

The limpkin resembles a large rail. It has drab-brown plumage and a grayer head and neck.

- Limpkin, Aramus guarauna (Linnaeus, 1766)

== Trumpeters ==
Order: Gruiformes Family: Psophiidae

The trumpeters are dumpy birds with long necks and legs and chicken-like bills. They are named for the trumpeting call of the males.

- Gray-winged trumpeter, Psophia crepitans Linnaeus, 1758
- Pale-winged trumpeter, Psophia leucoptera Spix, 1825
- Dark-winged trumpeter, Psophia viridis Spix, 1825 (E)

== Rails ==
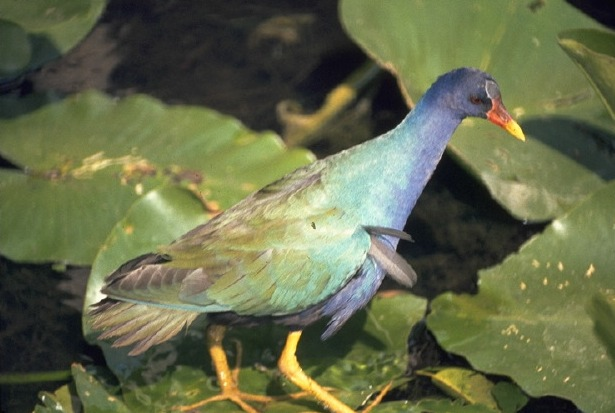
Purple gallinule

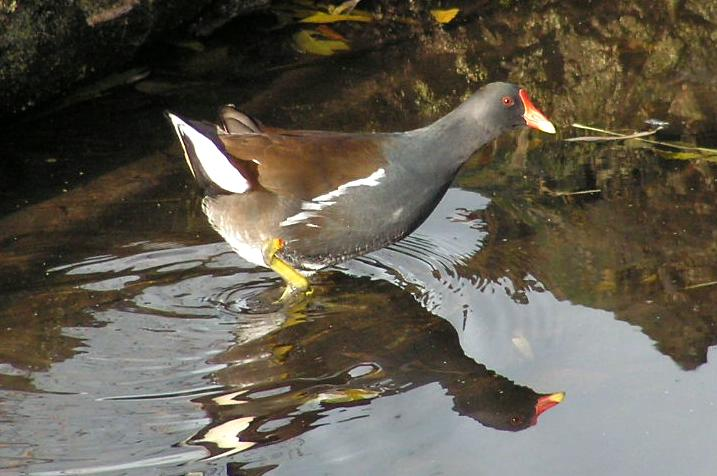
Common gallinule

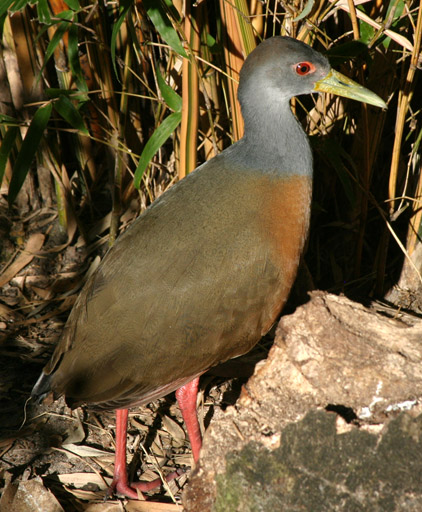
Gray-cowled wood-rail

Order: Gruiformes Family: Rallidae

Rallidae is a large family of small to medium-sized birds which includes the rails, crakes, coots, and gallinules. Typically they inhabit dense vegetation in damp environments near lakes, swamps, or rivers. In general they are shy and secretive birds, making them difficult to observe. Most species have strong legs and long toes which are well adapted to soft uneven surfaces. They tend to have short, rounded wings and to be weak fliers.

- Corn crake, Crex crex (Linnaeus, 1758) (V)
- Mangrove rail, Rallus longirostris Boddaert, 1783
- Allen's gallinule, Porphyrio alleni Thomson, 1824 (UC)(V)
- Purple gallinule, Porphyrio martinica (Linnaeus, 1766)
- Azure gallinule, Porphyrio flavirostris (Gmelin, JF, 1789)
- Chestnut-headed crake, Anurolimnas castaneiceps (Sclater, PL & Salvin, 1869)
- Russet-crowned crake, Anurolimnas viridis (Müller, PLS, 1776)
- Black-banded crake, Anurolimnas fasciatus (Sclater, PL & Salvin, 1868)
- Rufous-sided crake, Laterallus melanophaius (Vieillot, 1819)
- Gray-breasted crake, Laterallus exilis (Temminck, 1831)
- Black rail, Laterallus jamaicensis (Gmelin, JF, 1789) EN
- Red-and-white crake, Laterallus leucopyrrhus (Vieillot, 1819)
- Rufous-faced crake, Laterallus xenopterus Conover, 1934 VU
- Speckled rail, Coturnicops notatus (Gould, 1841)
- Ocellated crake, Micropygia schomburgkii (Schomburgk, 1848)
- Ash-throated crake, Mustelirallus albicollis (Vieillot, 1819)
- Paint-billed crake, Mustelirallus erythrops (Sclater, PL, 1867)
- Spotted rail, Pardirallus maculatus (Boddaert, 1783)
- Blackish rail, Pardirallus nigricans (Vieillot, 1819)
- Plumbeous rail, Pardirallus sanguinolentus (Swainson, 1838)
- Giant wood-rail, Aramides ypecaha (Vieillot, 1819)
- Little wood-rail, Aramides mangle (Spix, 1825) (E)
- Gray-cowled wood-rail, Aramides cajaneus (Müller, PLS, 1776)
- Red-winged wood-rail, Aramides calopterus Sclater, PL & Salvin, 1878
- Slaty-breasted wood-rail, Aramides saracura (Spix, 1825)
- Uniform crake, Amaurolimnas concolor (Gosse, 1847)
- Spot-flanked gallinule, Porphyriops melanops (Vieillot, 1819)
- Yellow-breasted crake, Porzana flaviventer (Boddaert, 1783)
- Dot-winged crake, Porzana spiloptera Durnford, 1877 NT
- Sora, Porzana carolina (Linnaeus, 1758) (V)
- Common gallinule, Gallinula galeata (Lichtenstein, MHC, 1818)
- Lesser moorhen, Gallinula angulata Sundevall, 1850 (V)
- Red-fronted coot, Fulica rufifrons Philippi & Landbeck, 1861
- Red-gartered coot, Fulica armillata Vieillot, 1817
- White-winged coot, Fulica leucoptera Vieillot, 1817

== Finfoots ==
Order: Gruiformes Family: Heliornithidae

Heliornithidae is a small family of tropical birds with webbed lobes on their feet similar to those of grebes and coots.

- Sungrebe, Heliornis fulica (Boddaert, 1783)

== Plovers ==
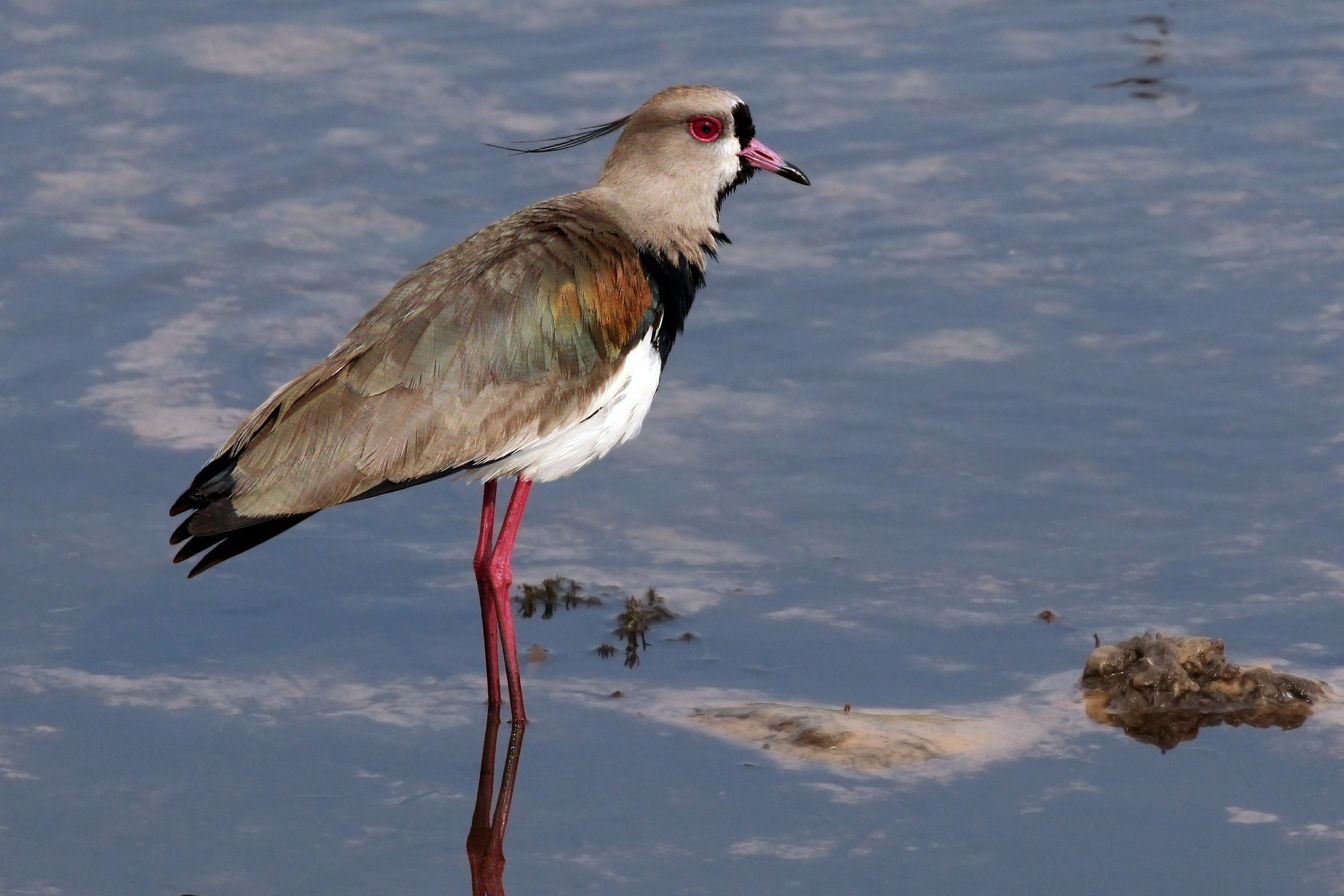
Southern lapwing

Order: Charadriiformes Family: Charadriidae

The family Charadriidae includes the plovers, dotterels, and lapwings. They are small to medium-sized birds with compact bodies, short thick necks, and long, usually pointed, wings. They are found in open country worldwide, mostly in habitats near water.

- Black-bellied plover, Pluvialis squatarola (Linnaeus, 1758) VU
- American golden-plover, Pluvialis dominica (Müller, PLS, 1776)
- Tawny-throated dotterel, Oreopholus ruficollis (Wagler, 1829)
- Pied lapwing, Hoploxypterus cayanus (Latham, 1790)
- Rufous-chested dotterel, Zoniyx modestus (Lichtenstein, MHC, 1823)
- Killdeer, Charadrius vociferus Linnaeus, 1758 (UC)(V) NT
- Semipalmated plover, Charadrius semipalmatus Bonaparte, 1825
- Northern lapwing, Vanellus vanellus (Linnaeus, 1758) (UC)(V)
- Southern lapwing, Vanellus chilensis (Molina, 1782)
- Wilson's plover, Anarynchus wilsonia (George Ord, 1814)
- Collared plover, Anarynchus collaris (Vieillot, 1818)
- Two-banded plover, Anarynchus falklandicus (Latham, 1790)

== Oystercatchers ==
Order: Charadriiformes Family: Haematopodidae

The oystercatchers are large and noisy plover-like birds, with strong bills used for smashing or prising open molluscs.

- American oystercatcher, Haematopus palliatus Temminck, 1820

== Avocets and stilts ==
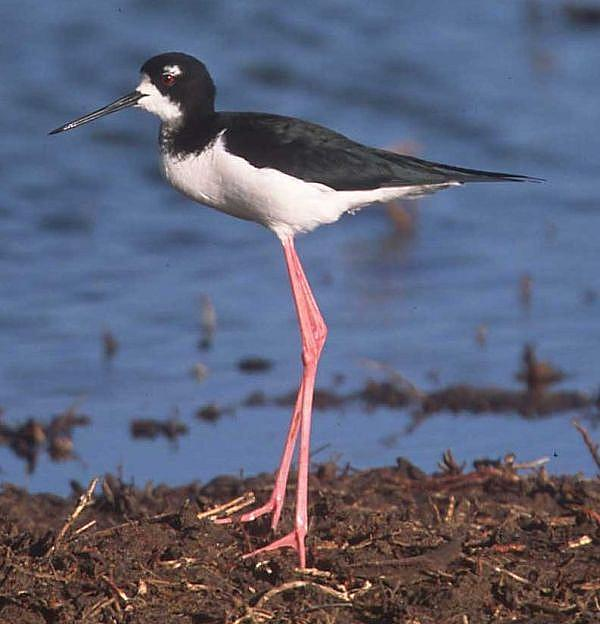
Black-necked stilt

Order: Charadriiformes Family: Recurvirostridae

Recurvirostridae is a family of large wading birds which includes the avocets and stilts. The avocets have long legs and long up-curved bills. The stilts have extremely long legs and long, thin, straight bills.

- Black-necked stilt, Himantopus mexicanus (Müller, PLS, 1776)

== Thick-knees ==
Order: Charadriiformes Family: Burhinidae

The thick-knees are a group of largely tropical waders in the family Burhinidae. They are found worldwide within the tropical zone, with some species also breeding in temperate Europe and Australia. They are medium to large waders with strong black or yellow-black bills, large yellow eyes, and cryptic plumage. Despite being classed as waders, most species have a preference for arid or semi-arid habitats.

- Double-striped thick-knee, Hesperoburhinus bistriatus (Wagler, 1829)

== Sheathbills ==
Order: Charadriiformes Family: Chionidae

The sheathbills are scavengers of the Antarctic regions. They have white plumage and look plump and dove-like but are believed to be similar to the ancestors of the modern gulls and terns.

- Snowy sheathbill, Chionis alba (Gmelin, JF, 1789)

== Sandpipers ==
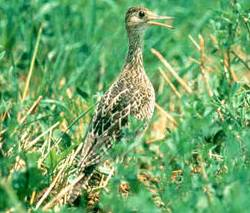
Upland sandpiper

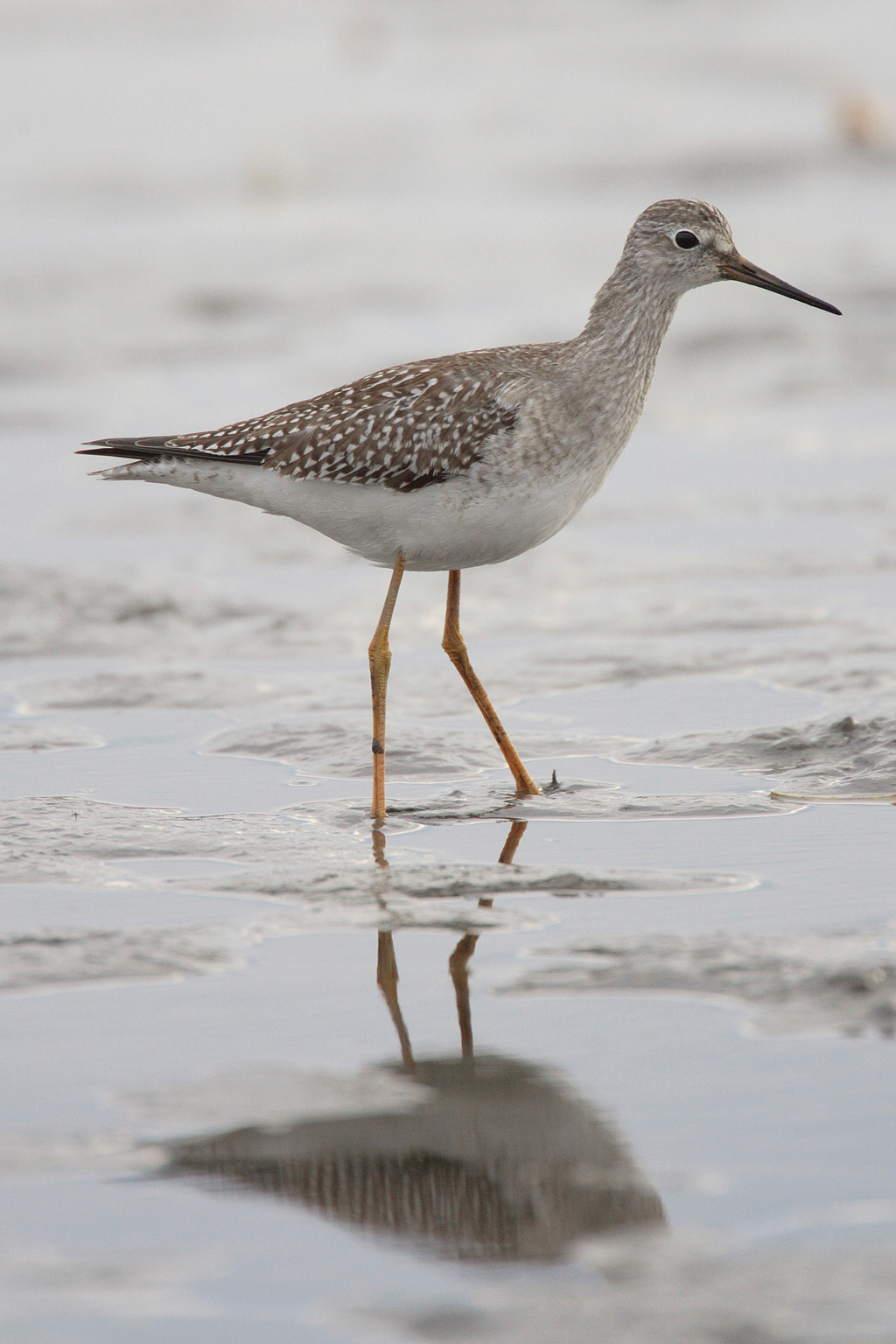
Lesser yellowlegs

Order: Charadriiformes Family: Scolopacidae

Scolopacidae is a large diverse family of small to medium-sized shorebirds including the sandpipers, curlews, godwits, shanks, tattlers, woodcocks, snipes, dowitchers, and phalaropes. The majority of these species eat small invertebrates picked out of the mud or soil. Variation in length of legs and bills enables multiple species to feed in the same habitat, particularly on the coast, without direct competition for food.

- Upland sandpiper, Bartramia longicauda
- Eskimo curlew, Numenius borealis (believed extinct)
- Whimbrel, Numenius phaeopus
- Bar-tailed godwit, Limosa lapponica (V)
- Hudsonian godwit, Limosa haemastica
- Marbled godwit, Limosa fedoa (V)
- Ruddy turnstone, Arenaria interpres
- Red knot, Calidris canutus
- Ruff, Calidris pugnax (V)
- Stilt sandpiper, Calidris himantopus
- Curlew sandpiper, Calidris ferruginea (V)
- Sanderling, Calidris alba
- Baird's sandpiper, Calidris bairdii
- Little stint, Calidris minuta (V)
- Least sandpiper, Calidris minutilla
- White-rumped sandpiper, Calidris fuscicollis
- Buff-breasted sandpiper, Calidris subruficollis (near-threatened)
- Pectoral sandpiper, Calidris melanotos
- Semipalmated sandpiper, Calidris pusilla
- Western sandpiper, Calidris mauri (V)
- Short-billed dowitcher, Limnodromus griseus
- Giant snipe, Gallinago undulata
- Pantanal snipe, Gallinago paraguaiae
- Wilson's phalarope, Phalaropus tricolor
- Red-necked phalarope, Phalaropus lobatus (V)
- Red phalarope, Phalaropus fulicarius (V)
- Terek sandpiper, Xenus cinereus (V)
- Spotted sandpiper, Actitis macularius
- Solitary sandpiper, Tringa solitaria
- Greater yellowlegs, Tringa melanoleuca
- Willet, Tringa semipalmata
- Lesser yellowlegs, Tringa flavipes
- Common greenshank, Tringa nebularia (UC)(V)
- Common redshank, Tringa totanus (V)
- Wood sandpiper, Tringa glareola (V)

== Seedsnipes ==
Order: Charadriiformes Family: Thinocoridae

The seedsnipes are a small family of birds that superficially resemble sparrows. They have short legs and long wings and are herbivorous waders.

- Least seedsnipe, Thinocorus rumicivorus (V)

== Jacanas ==
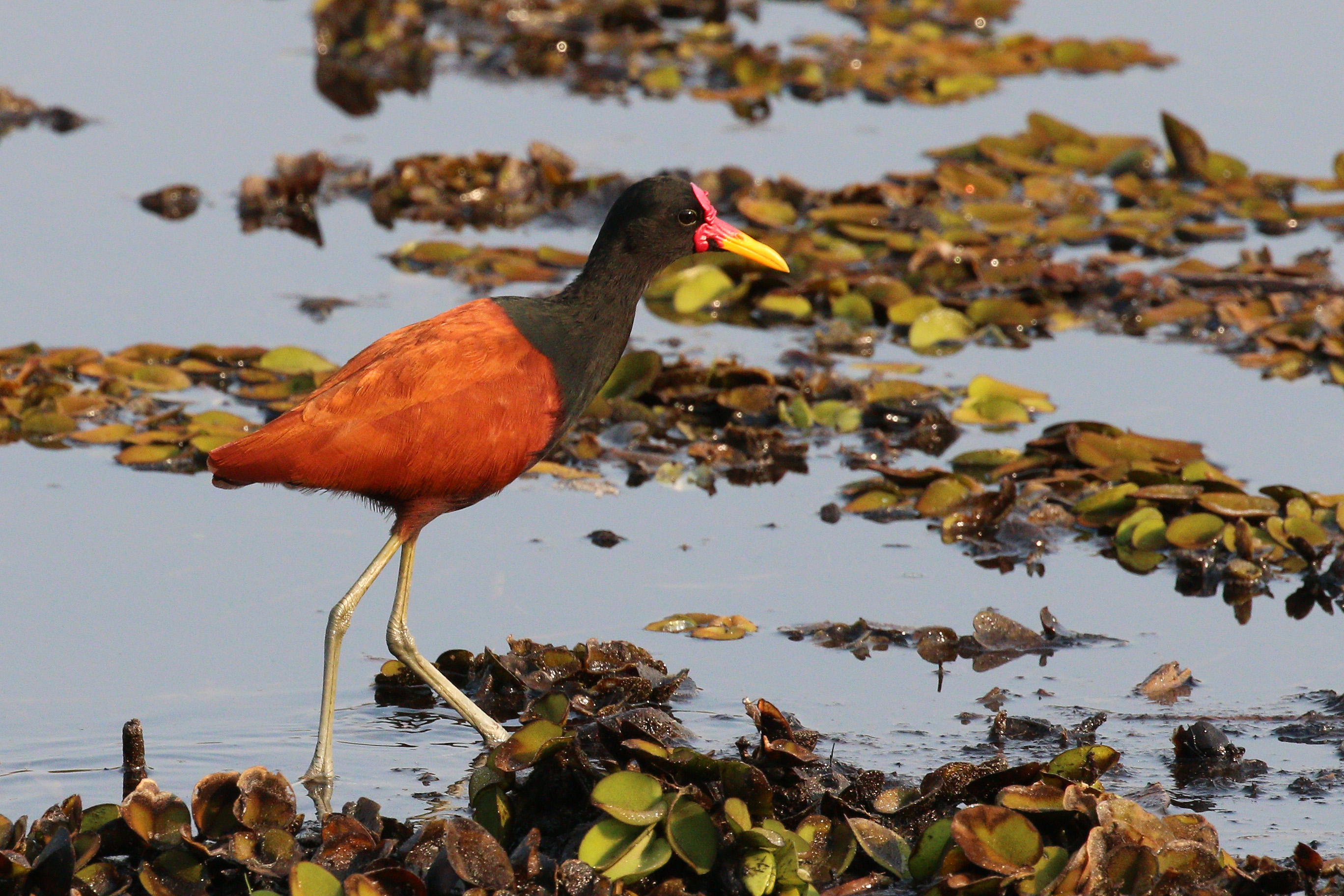
Wattled jacana

Order: Charadriiformes Family: Jacanidae

The jacanas are a family of waders found throughout the tropics. They are identifiable by their huge feet and claws which enable them to walk on floating vegetation in the shallow lakes that are their preferred habitat.

- Wattled jacana, Jacana jacana

== Painted-snipes ==
Order: Charadriiformes Family: Rostratulidae

Painted-snipes are short-legged, long-billed birds similar in shape to the true snipes, but more brightly colored.

- South American painted-snipe, Nycticryphes semicollaris

== Pratincoles and coursers ==
Order: Charadriiformes Family: Glareolidae

Glareolidae is a family of wading birds comprising the pratincoles, which have short legs, long pointed wings and long forked tails, and the coursers, which have long legs, short wings and long, pointed bills which curve downwards.

- Collared pratincole, Glareola pratincola (V)

== Skuas ==
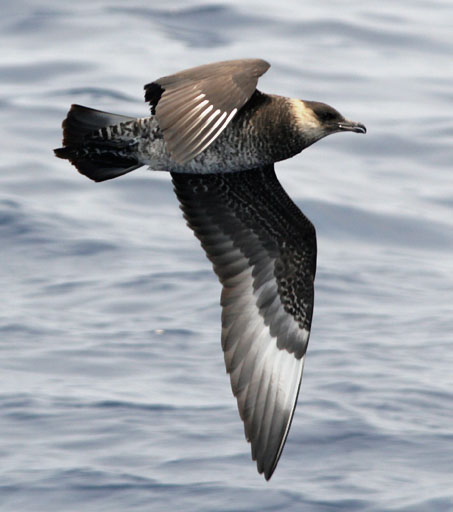
Pomarine jaeger

Order: Charadriiformes Family: Stercorariidae

The family Stercorariidae are, in general, medium to large birds, typically with gray or brown plumage, often with white markings on the wings. They nest on the ground in temperate and arctic regions and are long-distance migrants.

- Great skua, Stercorarius skua (V)
- Chilean skua, Stercorarius chilensis
- South polar skua, Stercorarius maccormicki
- Brown skua, Stercorarius antarcticus
- Pomarine jaeger, Stercorarius pomarinus
- Parasitic jaeger, Stercorarius parasiticus
- Long-tailed jaeger, Stercorarius longicaudus

== Gulls ==
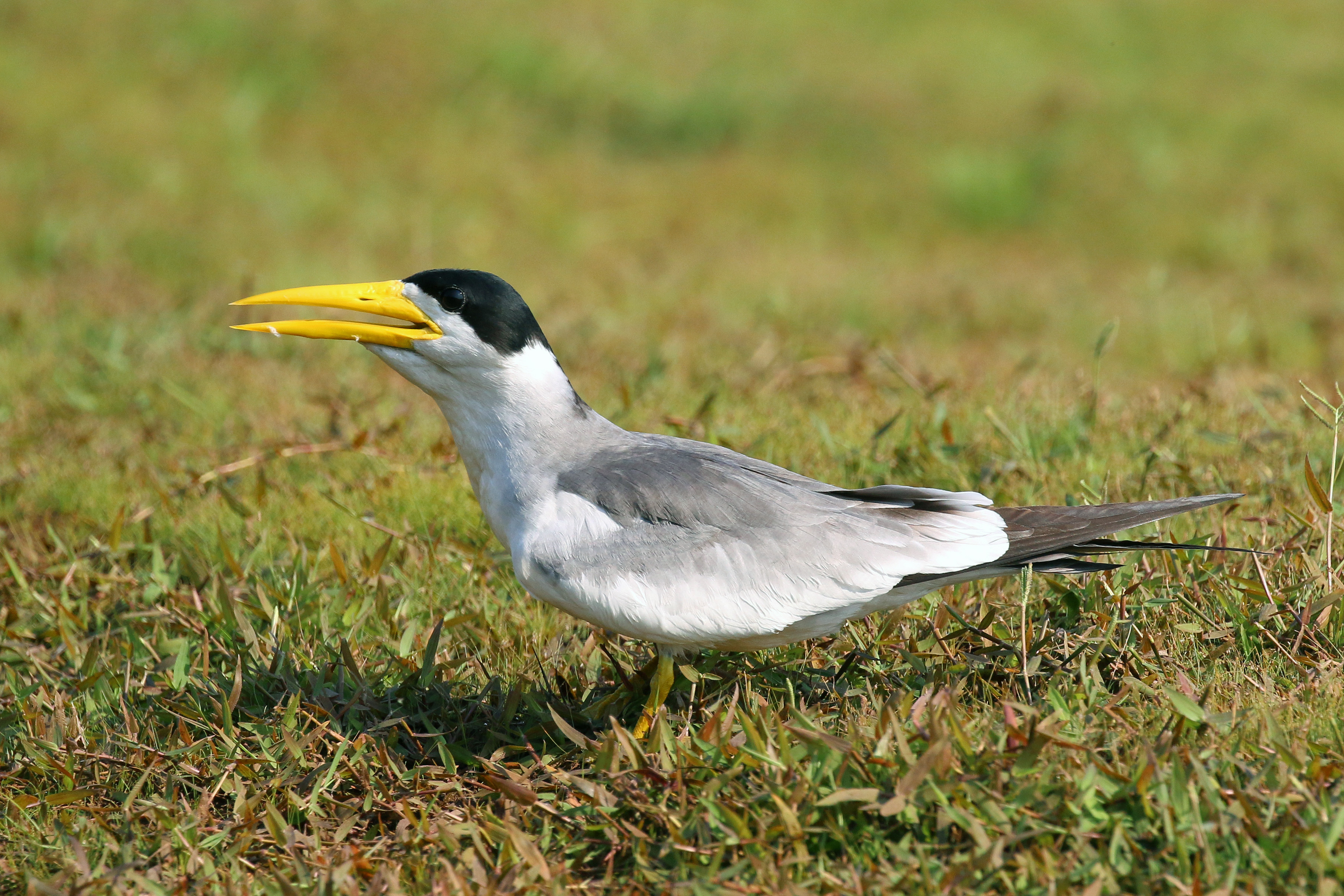
Large-billed tern

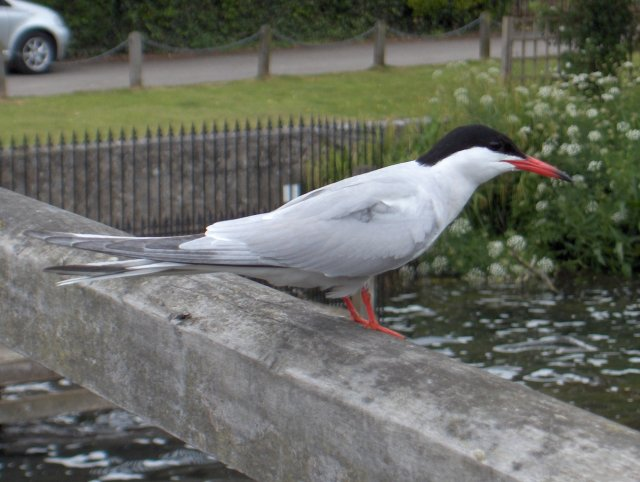
Common tern

Order: Charadriiformes Family: Laridae

Laridae is a family of medium to large seabirds and includes gulls, terns and skimmers. Gulls are typically gray or white, often with black markings on the head or wings. They have longish bills and webbed feet. Terns are a group of generally medium to large seabirds typically with gray or white plumage, often with black markings on the head. Most terns hunt fish by diving but some pick insects off the surface of fresh water. Terns are generally long-lived birds, with several species known to live in excess of 30 years.

- Brown noddy, Anous stolidus
- Black noddy, Anous minutus
- Atlantic white-tern, Gygis alba
- Black skimmer, Rynchops niger
- Sabine's gull, Xema sabini (V)
- Brown-hooded gull, Chroicocephalus maculipennis
- Gray-hooded gull, Chroicocephalus cirrocephalus
- Black-headed gull, Chroicocephalus ridibundus (V)
- Gray gull, Leucophaeus modestus (V)
- Laughing gull, Leucophaeus atricilla
- Franklin's gull, Leucophaeus pipixcan (V)
- Olrog's gull, Larus atlanticus
- Ring-billed gull, Larus delawarensis (V)
- Kelp gull, Larus dominicanus
- Lesser black-backed gull, Larus fuscus (V)
- Sooty tern, Onychoprion fuscata
- Least tern, Sternula antillarum
- Yellow-billed tern, Sternula superciliaris
- Large-billed tern, Phaetusa simplex
- Gull-billed tern, Gelochelidon nilotica
- Black tern, Chlidonias niger
- White-winged tern, Chlidonias leucopterus (V)
- Common tern, Sterna hirundo
- Roseate tern, Sterna dougallii
- Arctic tern, Sterna paradisaea
- South American tern, Sterna hirundinacea
- Antarctic tern, Sterna vittata (V)
- Snowy-crowned tern, Sterna trudeaui
- Sandwich tern, Thalasseus sandvicensis
- Royal tern, Thalasseus maximus

== Sunbittern ==
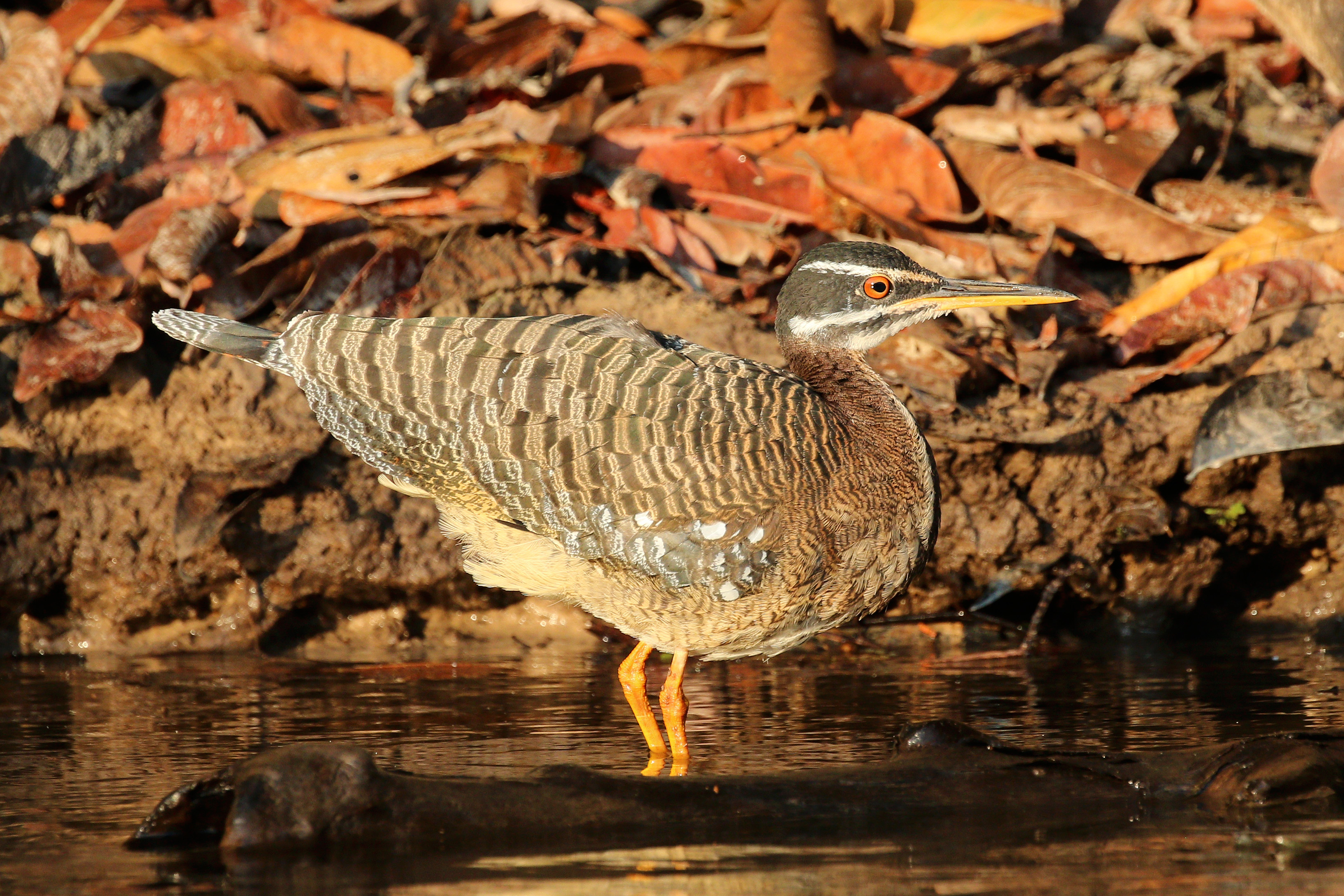
Sunbittern

Order: Eurypygiformes Family: Eurypygidae

The sunbittern is a bittern-like bird of tropical regions of the Americas and the sole member of the family Eurypygidae (sometimes spelled Eurypigidae) and genus Eurypyga.

- Sunbittern, Eurypyga helias

== Tropicbirds ==
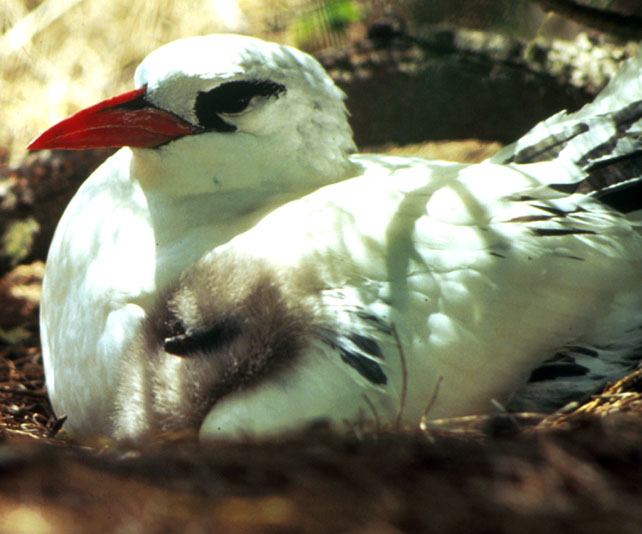
Red-tailed tropicbird

Order: Phaethontiformes Family: Phaethontidae

Tropicbirds are slender white birds of tropical oceans, with exceptionally long central tail feathers. Their heads and long wings have black markings.

- Red-billed tropicbird, Phaethon aethereus
- Red-tailed tropicbird, Phaethon rubricauda (V)
- White-tailed tropicbird, Phaethon lepturus

== Penguins ==
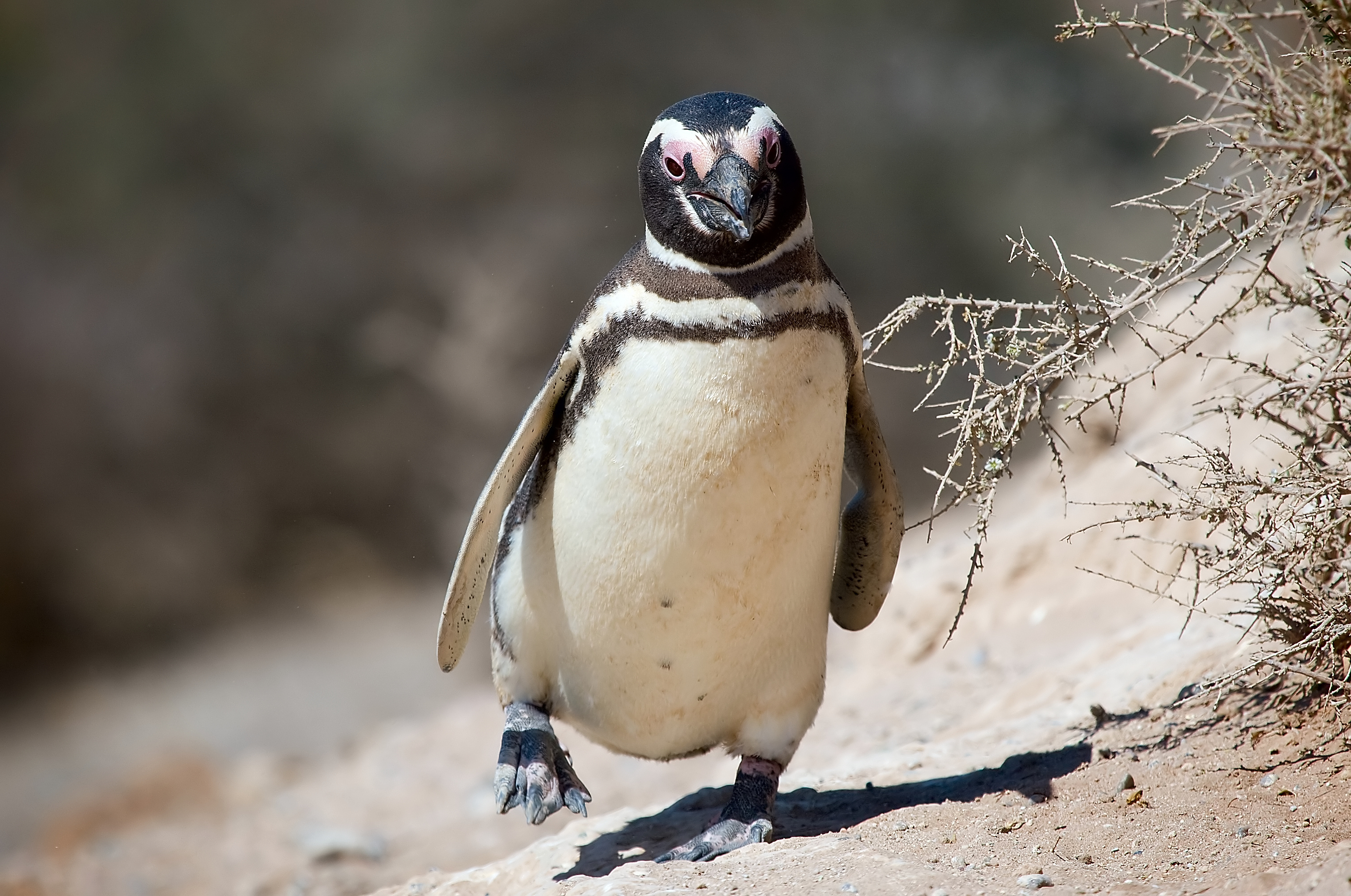
Magellanic penguin

Order: Sphenisciformes Family: Spheniscidae

The penguins are a group of aquatic, flightless birds living almost exclusively in the Southern Hemisphere. Most penguins feed on krill, fish, squid, and other forms of sealife caught while swimming underwater.

- King penguin, Aptenodytes patagonicus (V)
- Magellanic penguin, Spheniscus magellanicus
- Macaroni penguin, Eudyptes chrysolophus (V) (vulnerable)
- Rockhopper penguin, Eudyptes chrysocome (V) (vulnerable)

== Albatrosses ==
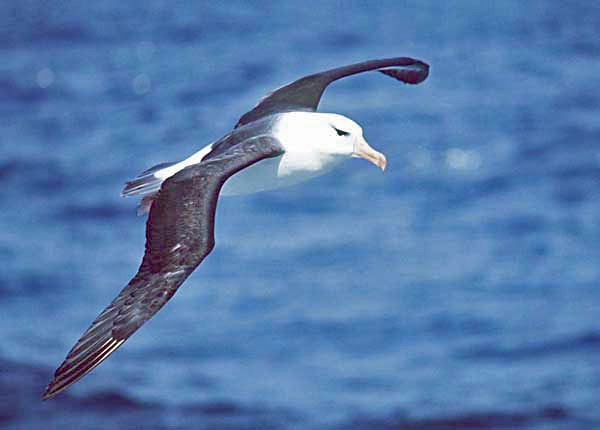
Black-browed albatross

Order: Procellariiformes Family: Diomedeidae

The albatrosses are among the largest of flying birds, and the great albatrosses from the genus Diomedea have the largest wingspans of any extant birds.

- Royal albatross, Diomedea epomophora
- Wandering albatross, Diomedea exulans
- Sooty albatross, Phoebetria fusca (endangered)
- Light-mantled albatross, Phoebetria palpebrata
- Yellow-nosed albatross, Thalassarche chlororhynchos
- Black-browed albatross, Thalassarche melanophris
- Gray-headed albatross, Thalassarche chrysostoma (V) (endangered)
- White-capped albatross, Thalassarche cauta (V) (near-threatened)

== Southern storm-petrels ==
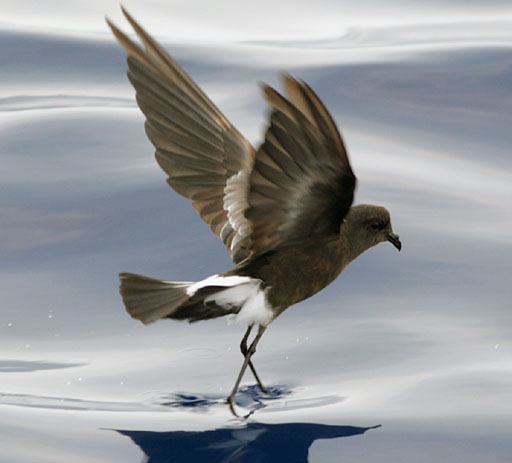
Wilson's storm-petrel

Order: Procellariiformes Family: Oceanitidae

The storm-petrels are the smallest seabirds, relatives of the petrels, feeding on planktonic crustaceans and small fish picked from the surface, typically while hovering. The flight is fluttering and sometimes bat-like. Until 2018, this family's species were included with the other storm-petrels in family Hydrobatidae.

- White-bellied storm-petrel, Fregetta grallaria
- Black-bellied storm-petrel, Fregetta tropica
- Wilson's storm-petrel, Oceanites oceanicus
- White-faced storm-petrel, Pelagodroma marina (V)

== Northern storm-petrels ==
Order: Procellariiformes Family: Hydrobatidae

Though the members of this family are similar in many respects to the southern storm-petrels, including their general appearance and habits, there are enough genetic differences to warrant their placement in a separate family.

- European storm-petrel, Hydrobates pelagicus (UC)(V)
- Band-rumped storm-petrel, Hydrobates castro (U)
- Leach's storm-petrel, Hydrobates leucorhous

== Shearwaters ==
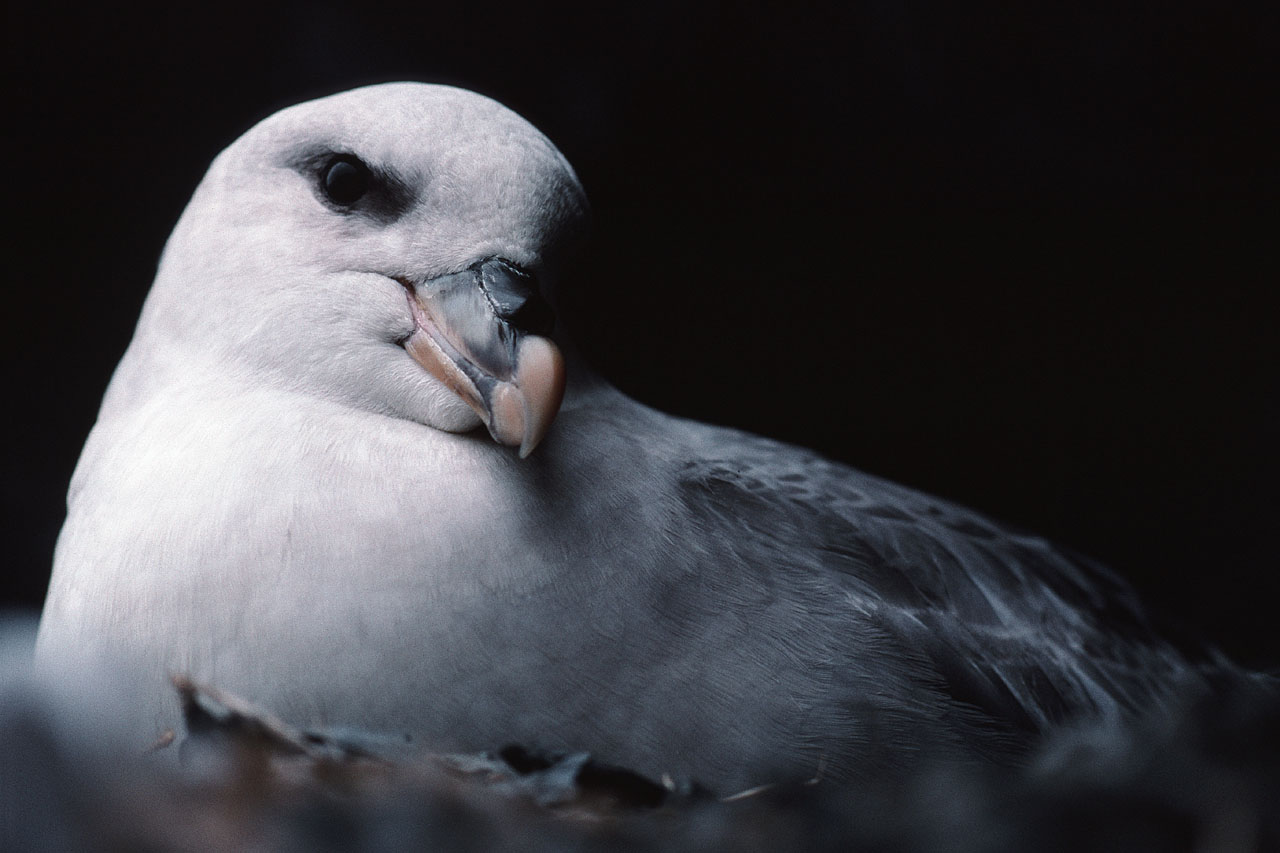
Southern fulmar

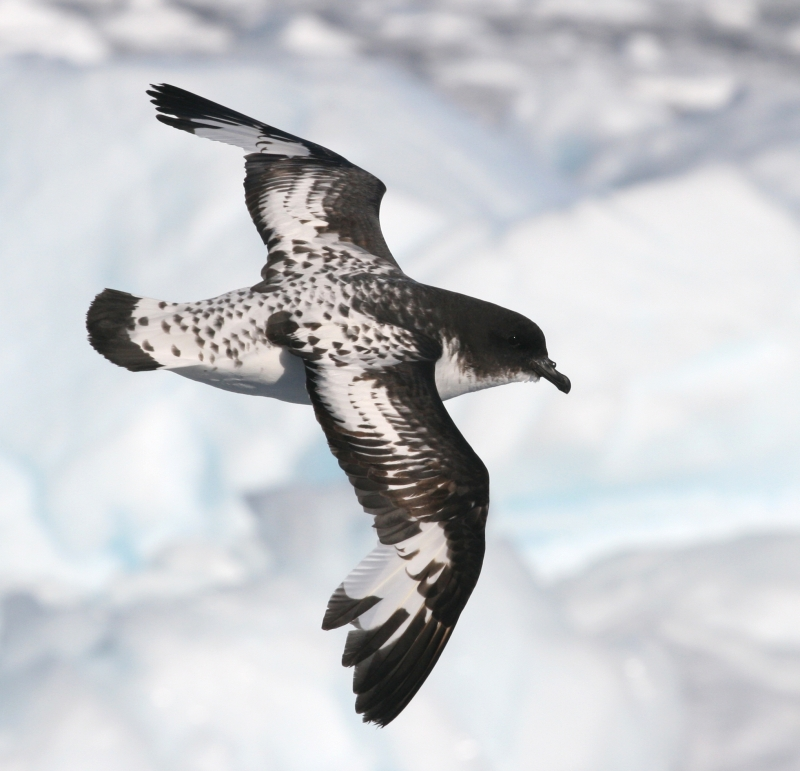
Cape petrel

Order: Procellariiformes Family: Procellariidae

The procellariids are the main group of medium-sized "true petrels", characterized by united nostrils with medium septum and a long outer functional primary.

- Southern giant-petrel, Macronectes giganteus
- Northern giant-petrel, Macronectes halli
- Southern fulmar, Fulmarus glacialoides
- Pintado petrel, Daption capense
- Kerguelen petrel, Aphrodroma brevirostris (V)
- Great-winged petrel, Pterodroma macroptera (V)
- Soft-plumaged petrel, Pterodroma mollis
- Black-capped petrel, Pterodroma hasitata (U) (endangered)
- Atlantic petrel, Pterodroma incerta (endangered)
- White-headed petrel, Pterodroma lessonii (V)
- Trindade petrel, Pterodroma arminjoniana
- Fea's petrel, Pterodroma feae
- Blue petrel, Halobaena caerulea
- Broad-billed prion, Pachyptila vittata (V)
- Antarctic prion, Pachyptila desolata
- Slender-billed prion, Pachyptila belcheri
- Bulwer's petrel, Bulweria bulwerii
- Gray petrel, Procellaria cinerea (V) (near-threatened)
- White-chinned petrel, Procellaria aequinoctialis
- Spectacled petrel, Procellaria conspicillata
- Cory's shearwater, Calonectris diomedea
- Cape Verde shearwater, Calonectris edwardsii
- Short-tailed shearwater, Ardenna tenuirostris (V)
- Sooty shearwater, Ardenna grisea
- Great shearwater, Ardenna gravis
- Manx shearwater, Puffinus puffinus
- Little shearwater, Puffinus assimilis (U)
- Audubon's shearwater, Puffinus lherminieri
- Magellanic diving-petrel, Pelecanoides magellani (V)

== Storks ==
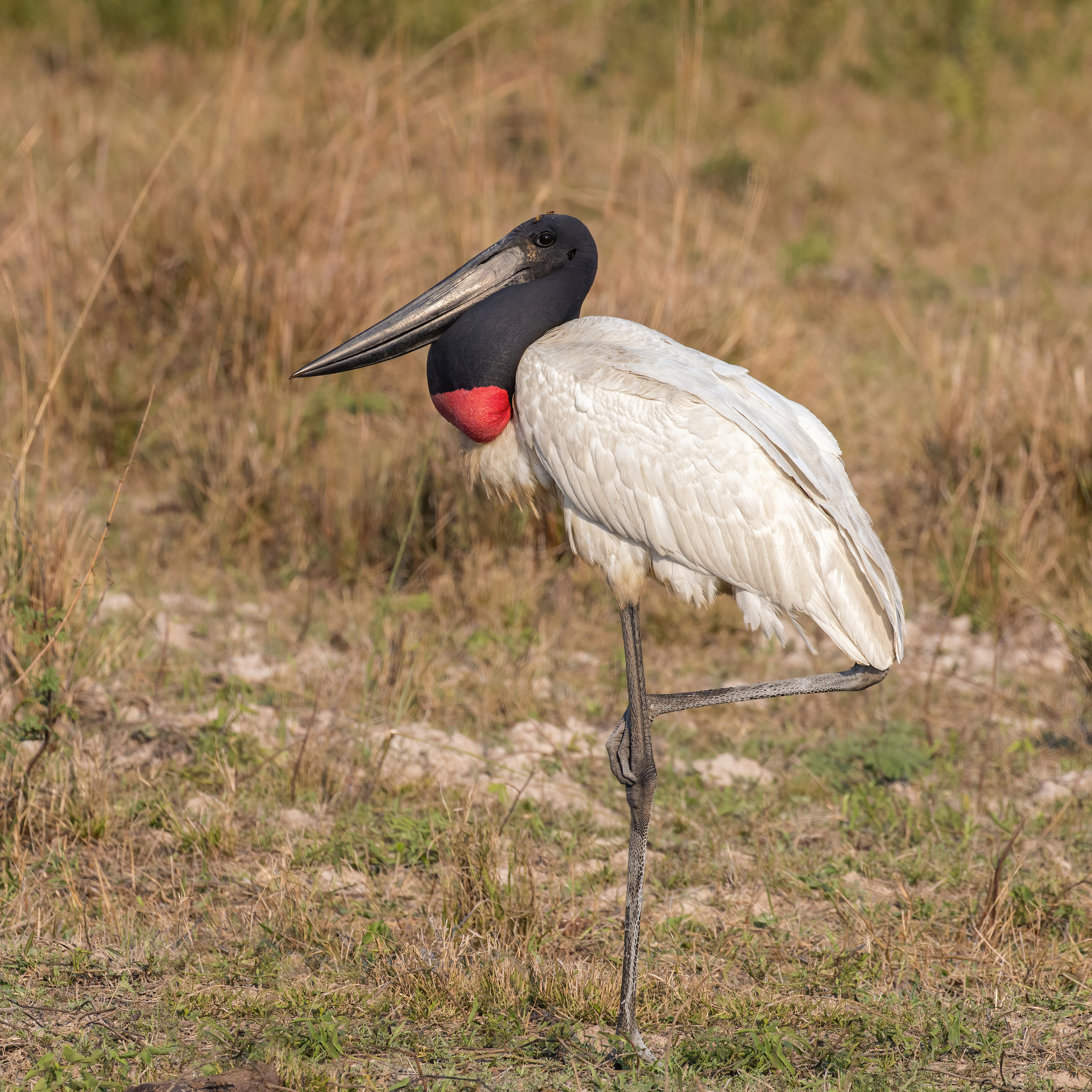
Jabiru

Order: Ciconiiformes Family: Ciconiidae

Storks are large, long-legged, long-necked wading birds with long, stout bills. Storks are mute, but bill-clattering is an important mode of communication at the nest. Their nests can be large and may be reused for many years. Many species are migratory.

- Maguari stork, Ciconia maguari
- Jabiru, Jabiru mycteria
- Wood stork, Mycteria americana

== Frigatebirds ==
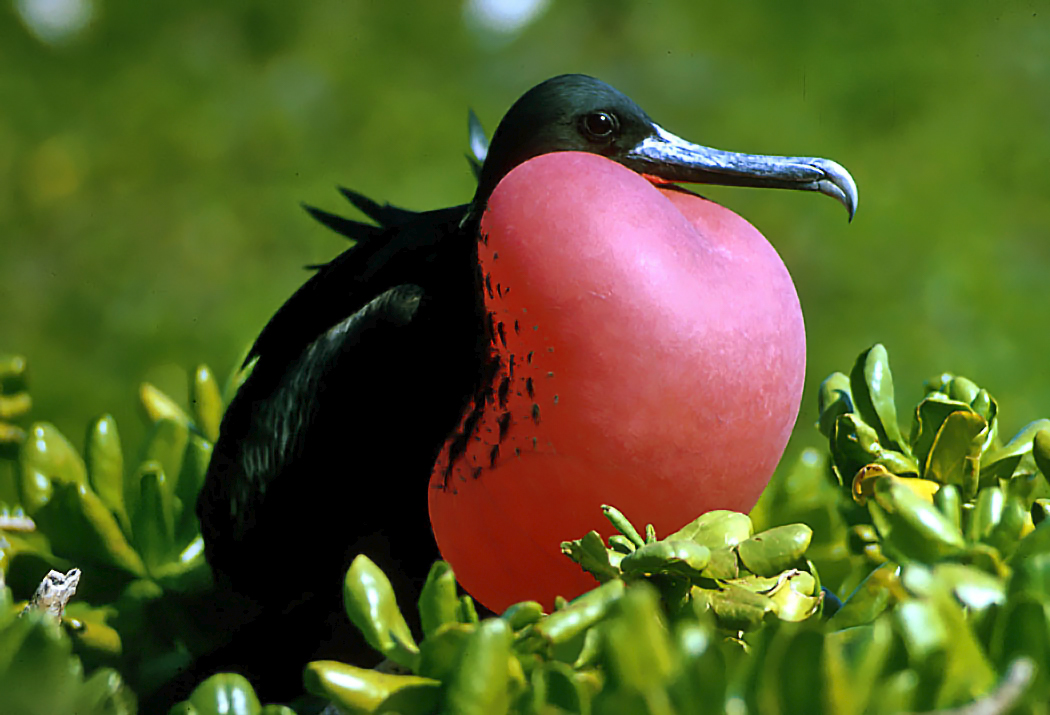
Magnificent frigatebird

Order: Suliformes Family: Fregatidae

Frigatebirds are large seabirds usually found over tropical oceans. They are large, black-and-white or completely black, with long wings and deeply forked tails. The males have colored inflatable throat pouches. They do not swim or walk and cannot take off from a flat surface. Having the largest wingspan-to-body-weight ratio of any bird, they are essentially aerial, able to stay aloft for more than a week.

- Lesser frigatebird, Fregata ariel
- Ascension frigatebird, Fregata aquila (V)
- Magnificent frigatebird, Fregata magnificens
- Great frigatebird, Fregata minor

== Boobies ==
Order: Suliformes Family: Sulidae

The sulids comprise the gannets and boobies. Both groups are medium to large coastal seabirds that plunge-dive for fish.

- Cape gannet, Morus capensis (V) (endangered)
- Australasian gannet, Morus serrator (V)
- Masked booby, Sula dactylatra
- Red-footed booby, Sula sula
- Brown booby, Sula leucogaster

== Anhingas ==
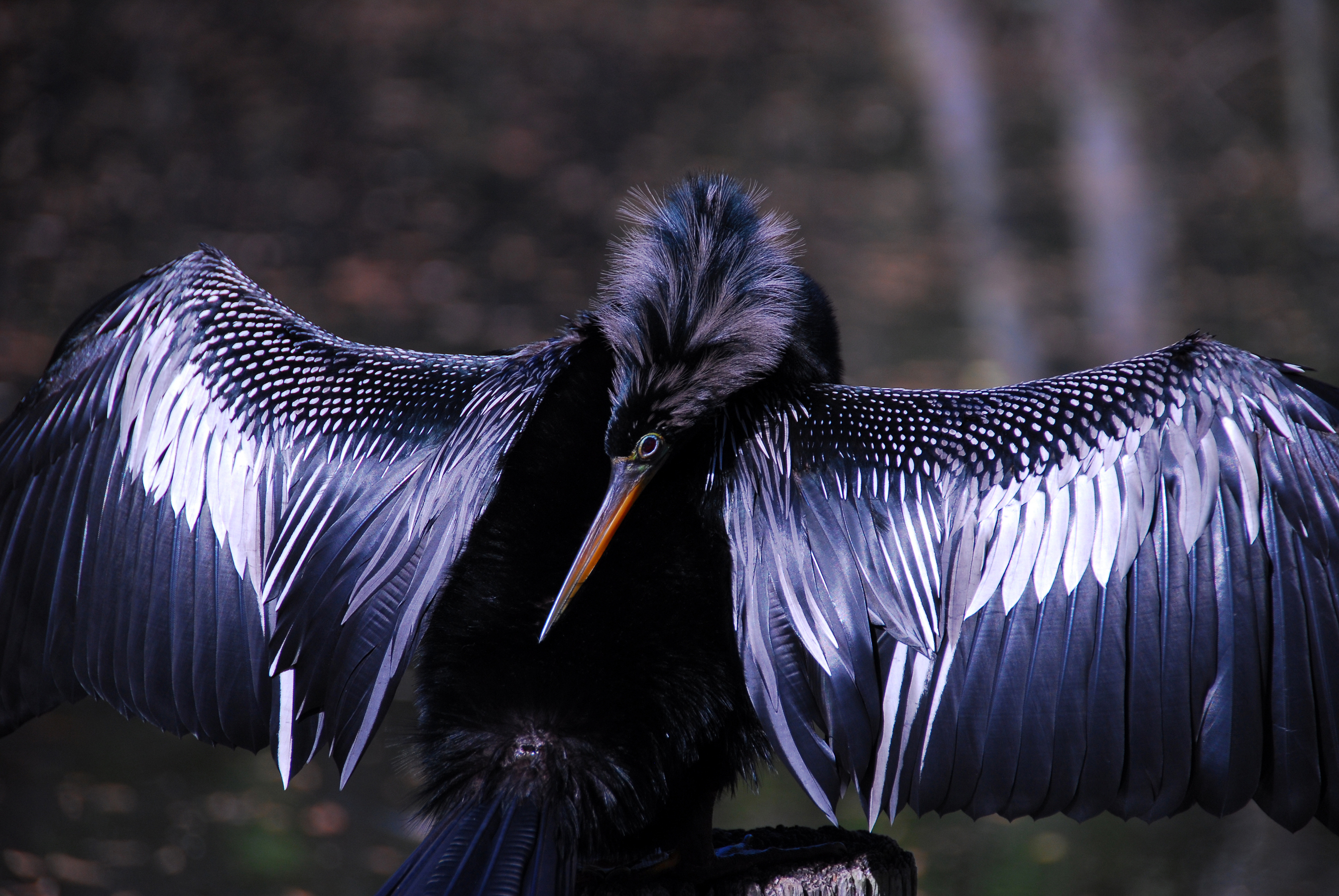
Anhinga

Order: Suliformes Family: Anhingidae

Anhingas are often called "snake-birds" because of their long thin neck, which gives a snake-like appearance when they swim with their bodies submerged. The males have black and dark-brown plumage, an erectile crest on the nape, and a larger bill than the female. The females have much paler plumage especially on the neck and underparts. The darters have completely webbed feet and their legs are short and set far back on the body. Their plumage is somewhat permeable, like that of cormorants, and they spread their wings to dry after diving.

- Anhinga, Anhinga anhinga

== Cormorants ==
Order: Suliformes Family: Phalacrocoracidae

Phalacrocoracidae is a family of medium to large coastal, fish-eating seabirds that includes cormorants and shags. Plumage coloration varies, with the majority having mainly dark plumage, some species being black-and-white, and a few being colorful.

- Neotropic cormorant, Phalacrocorax brasilianus
- Imperial cormorant, Phalacrocorax atriceps (U)

== Pelicans ==
Order: Pelecaniformes Family: Pelecanidae

Pelicans are large water birds with a distinctive pouch under their beak. As with other members of the order Pelecaniformes, they have webbed feet with four toes.

- Brown pelican, Pelecanus occidentalis (V)

== Herons ==
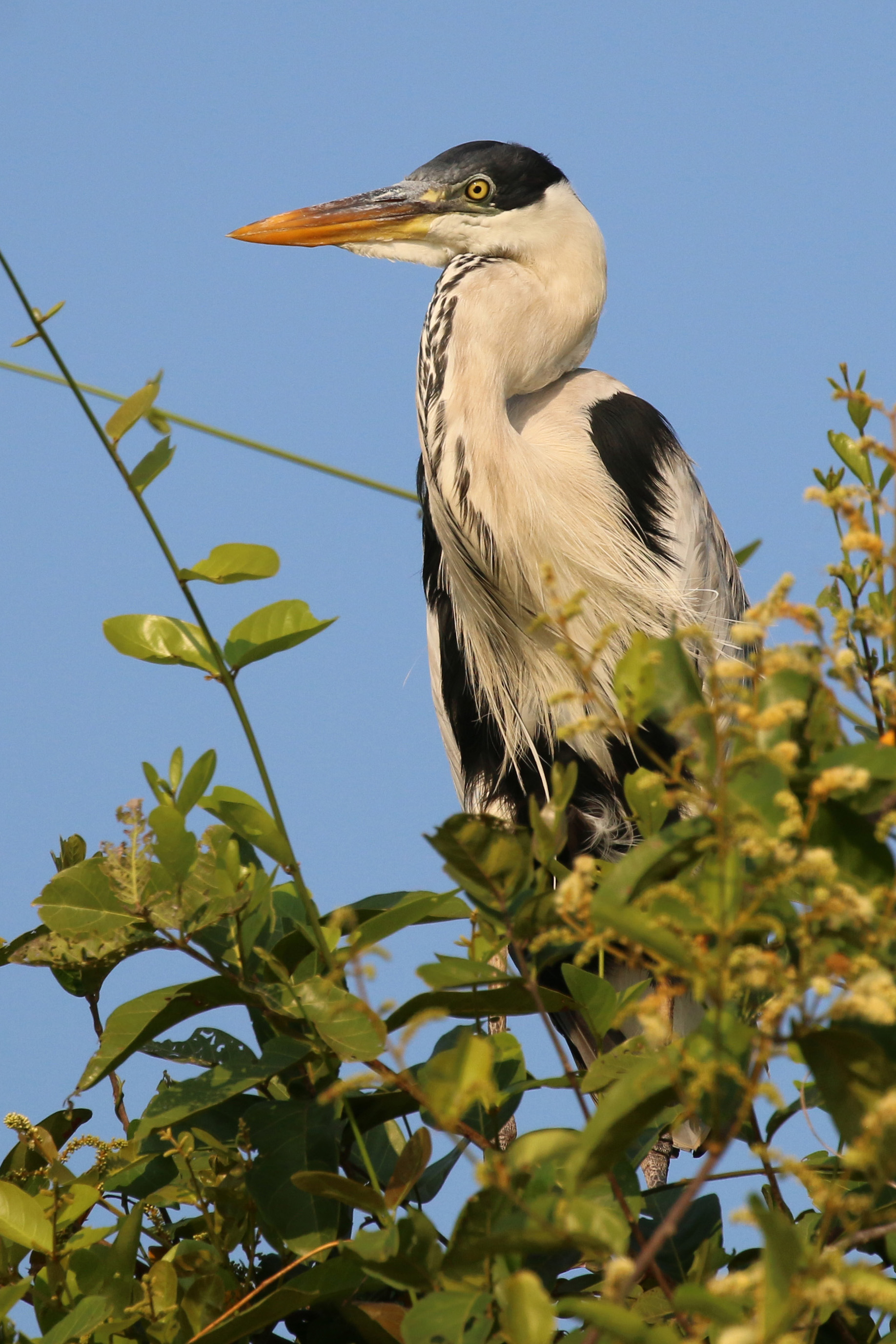
Cocoi heron

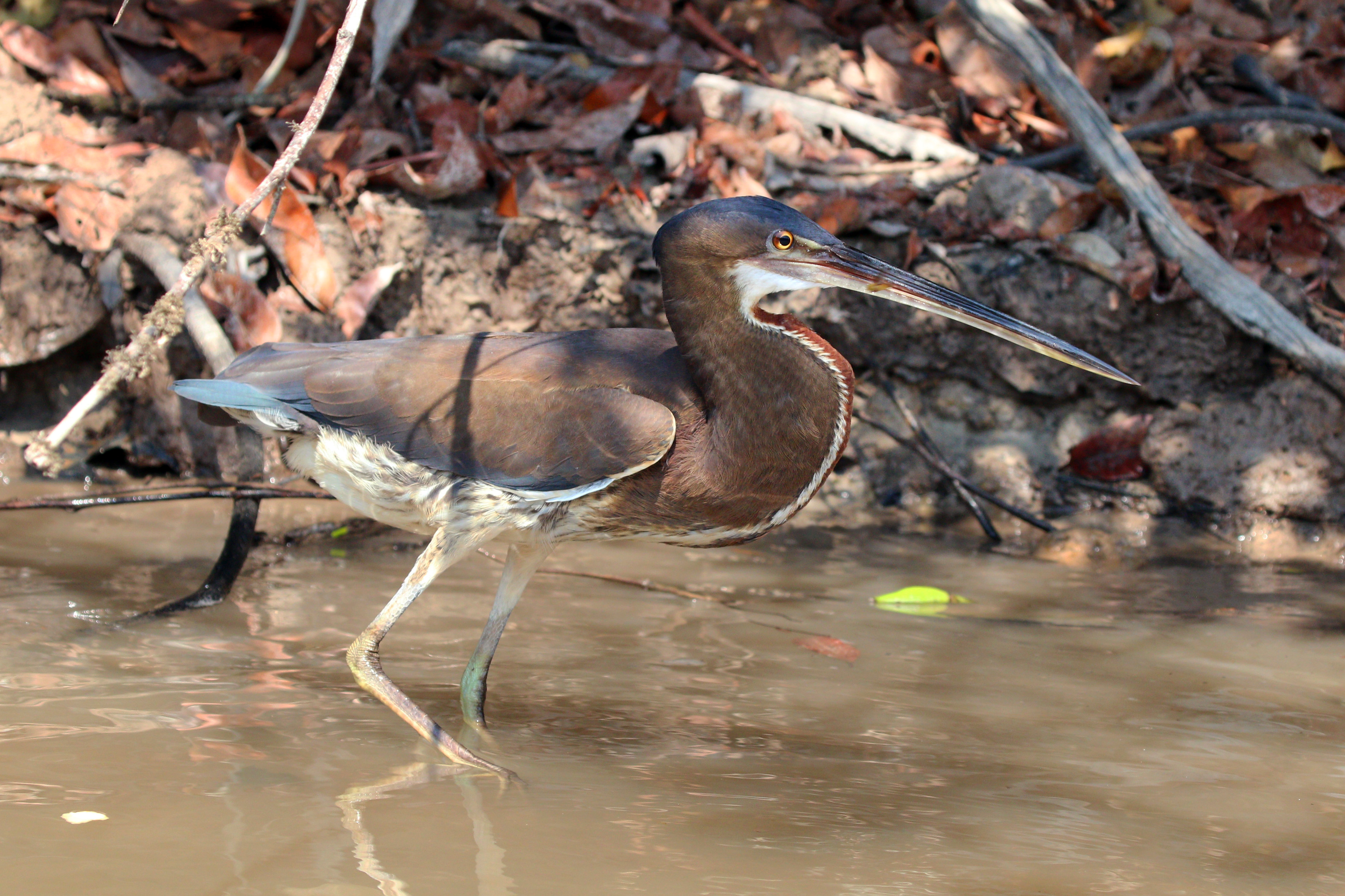
Agami heron

Order: Pelecaniformes Family: Ardeidae

The family Ardeidae contains the bitterns, herons, and egrets. Herons and egrets are medium to large wading birds with long necks and legs. Bitterns tend to be shorter necked and more wary. Members of Ardeidae fly with their necks retracted, unlike other long-necked birds such as storks, ibises, and spoonbills.

- Rufescent tiger-heron, Tigrisoma lineatum
- Fasciated tiger-heron, Tigrisoma fasciatum
- Boat-billed heron, Cochlearius cochlearius
- Agami heron, Agamia agami
- Zigzag heron, Zebrilus undulatus
- Stripe-backed bittern, Ixobrychus involucris
- Least bittern, Ixobrychus exilis
- Pinnated bittern, Botaurus pinnatus
- Capped heron, Pilherodius pileatus
- Whistling heron, Syrigma sibilatrix
- Little blue heron, Egretta caerulea
- Tricolored heron, Egretta tricolor
- Snowy egret, Egretta thula
- Little egret, Egretta garzetta (V)
- Western reef-heron, Egretta gularis (V)
- Yellow-crowned night-heron, Nyctanassa violacea
- Black-crowned night-heron, Nycticorax nycticorax
- Striated heron, Butorides striata
- Squacco heron, Ardeola ralloides (V)
- Cattle egret, Ardea ibis
- Great egret, Ardea alba
- Gray heron, Ardea cinerea (V)
- Great blue heron, Ardea herodias (U)
- Cocoi heron, Ardea cocoi
- Purple heron, Ardea purpurea (V)

== Ibises ==
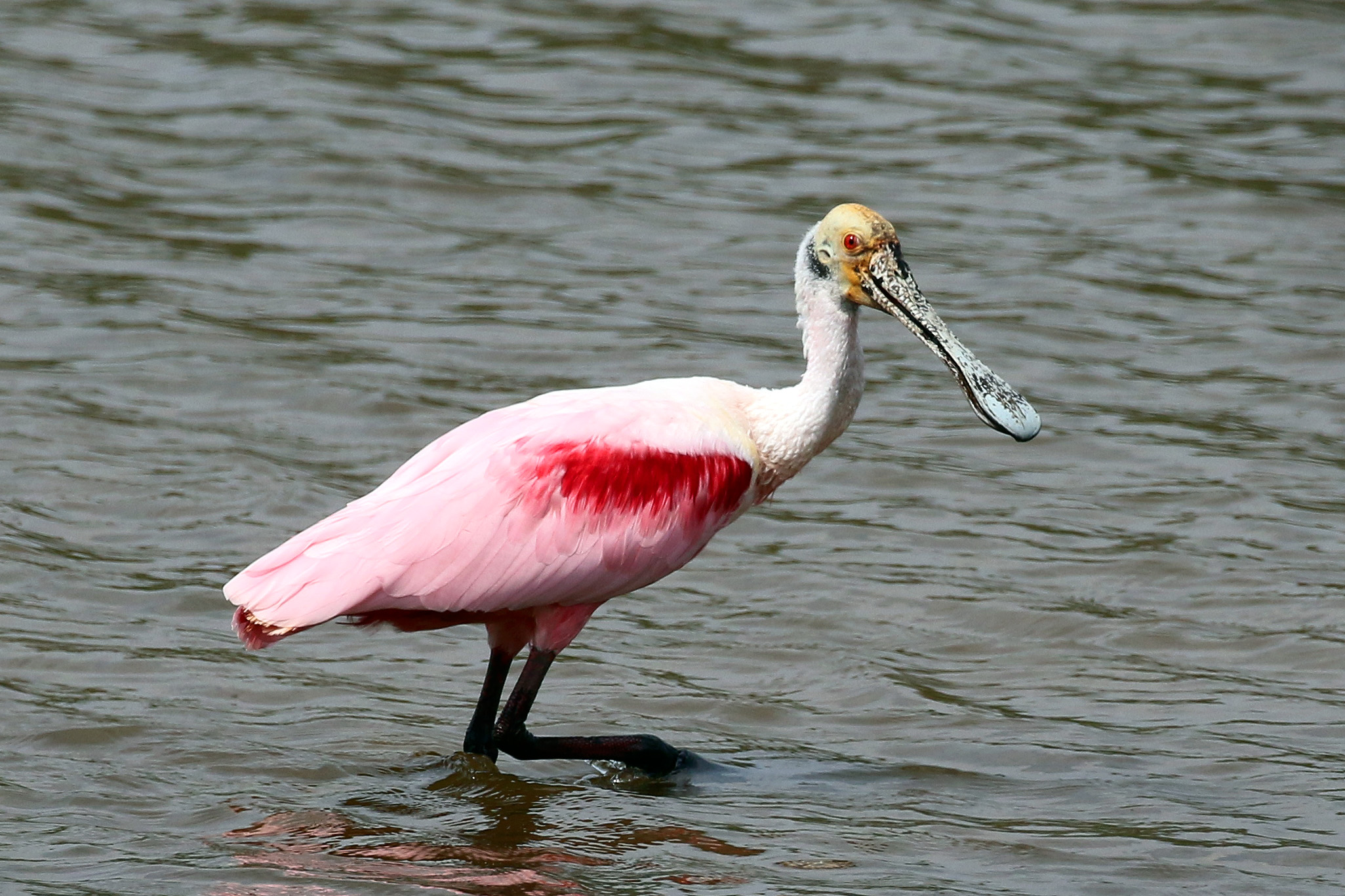
Roseate spoonbill

Order: Pelecaniformes Family: Threskiornithidae

Threskiornithidae is a family of large terrestrial and wading birds which includes the ibises and spoonbills. They have long, broad wings with 11 primary and about 20 secondary feathers. They are strong fliers and despite their size and weight, very capable soarers.

- Scarlet ibis, Eudocimus ruber
- White-faced ibis, Plegadis chihi
- Sharp-tailed ibis, Cercibis oxycerca
- Green ibis, Mesembrinibis cayennensis
- Bare-faced ibis, Phimosus infuscatus
- Plumbeous ibis, Theristicus caerulescens
- Buff-necked ibis, Theristicus caudatus
- Eurasian spoonbill, Platalea leucorodia (V)
- Roseate spoonbill, Platalea ajaja

== New World vultures ==
Order: Cathartiformes Family: Cathartidae

The New World vultures are not closely related to Old World vultures, but superficially resemble them because of convergent evolution. Like the Old World vultures, they are scavengers. However, unlike Old World vultures, which find carcasses by sight, New World vultures have a good sense of smell with which they locate carrion.

- King vulture, Sarcoramphus papa
- Andean condor, Vultur gryphus (U)
- Black vulture, Coragyps atratus
- Turkey vulture, Cathartes aura
- Lesser yellow-headed vulture, Cathartes burrovianus
- Greater yellow-headed vulture, Cathartes melambrotus

== Osprey ==
Order: Accipitriformes Family: Pandionidae

The family Pandionidae contains only one species, the osprey. The osprey is a medium-large raptor which is a specialist fish-eater with a worldwide distribution.

- Osprey, Pandion haliaetus

== Hawks ==
Order: Accipitriformes Family: Accipitridae

Accipitridae is a family of birds of prey, which includes hawks, eagles, kites, harriers, and Old World vultures. These birds have powerful hooked beaks for tearing flesh from their prey, strong legs, powerful talons, and keen eyesight.

- Pearl kite, Gampsonyx swainsonii
- White-tailed kite, Elanus leucurus
- Hook-billed kite, Chondrohierax uncinatus
- Gray-headed kite, Leptodon cayanensis
- White-collared kite, Leptodon forbesi (E) (endangered)
- Swallow-tailed kite, Elanoides forficatus
- Crested eagle, Morphnus guianensis (near-threatened)
- Harpy eagle, Harpia harpyja (near-threatened)
- Black hawk-eagle, Spizaetus tyrannus
- Black-and-white hawk-eagle, Spizaetus melanoleucus
- Ornate hawk-eagle, Spizaetus ornatus
- Black-collared hawk, Busarellus nigricollis
- Snail kite, Rostrhamus sociabilis
- Slender-billed kite, Helicolestes hamatus
- Double-toothed kite, Harpagus bidentatus
- Rufous-thighed kite, Harpagus diodon
- Mississippi kite, Ictinia mississippiensis
- Plumbeous kite, Ictinia plumbea
- Gray-bellied hawk, Accipiter poliogaster
- Sharp-shinned hawk, Accipiter striatus
- Bicolored hawk, Astur bicolor
- Cinereous harrier, Circus cinereus
- Long-winged harrier, Circus buffoni
- Tiny hawk, Microspizias superciliosus
- Black kite, Milvus migrans (V)
- Crane hawk, Geranospiza caerulescens
- Slate-colored hawk, Buteogallus schistaceus
- Common black hawk, Buteogallus anthracinus (U)
- Rufous crab hawk, Buteogallus aequinoctialis
- Savanna hawk, Buteogallus meridionalis
- White-necked hawk, Buteogallus lacernulatus (E) (vulnerable)
- Great black hawk, Buteogallus urubitinga
- Solitary eagle, Buteogallus solitarius
- Chaco eagle, Buteogallus coronatus (endangered)
- Roadside hawk, Rupornis magnirostris
- Harris's hawk, Parabuteo unicinctus
- White-rumped hawk, Parabuteo leucorrhous
- White-tailed hawk, Geranoaetus albicaudatus
- Variable hawk, Geranoaetus polyosoma (U)
- Black-chested buzzard-eagle, Geranoaetus melanoleucus
- Mantled hawk, Pseudastur polionotus (near-threatened)
- White hawk, Pseudastur albicollis
- Black-faced hawk, Leucopternis melanops
- White-browed hawk, Leucopternis kuhli
- Gray-lined hawk, Buteo nitidus
- Broad-winged hawk, Buteo platypterus
- Short-tailed hawk, Buteo brachyurus
- Swainson's hawk, Buteo swainsoni
- Zone-tailed hawk, Buteo albonotatus
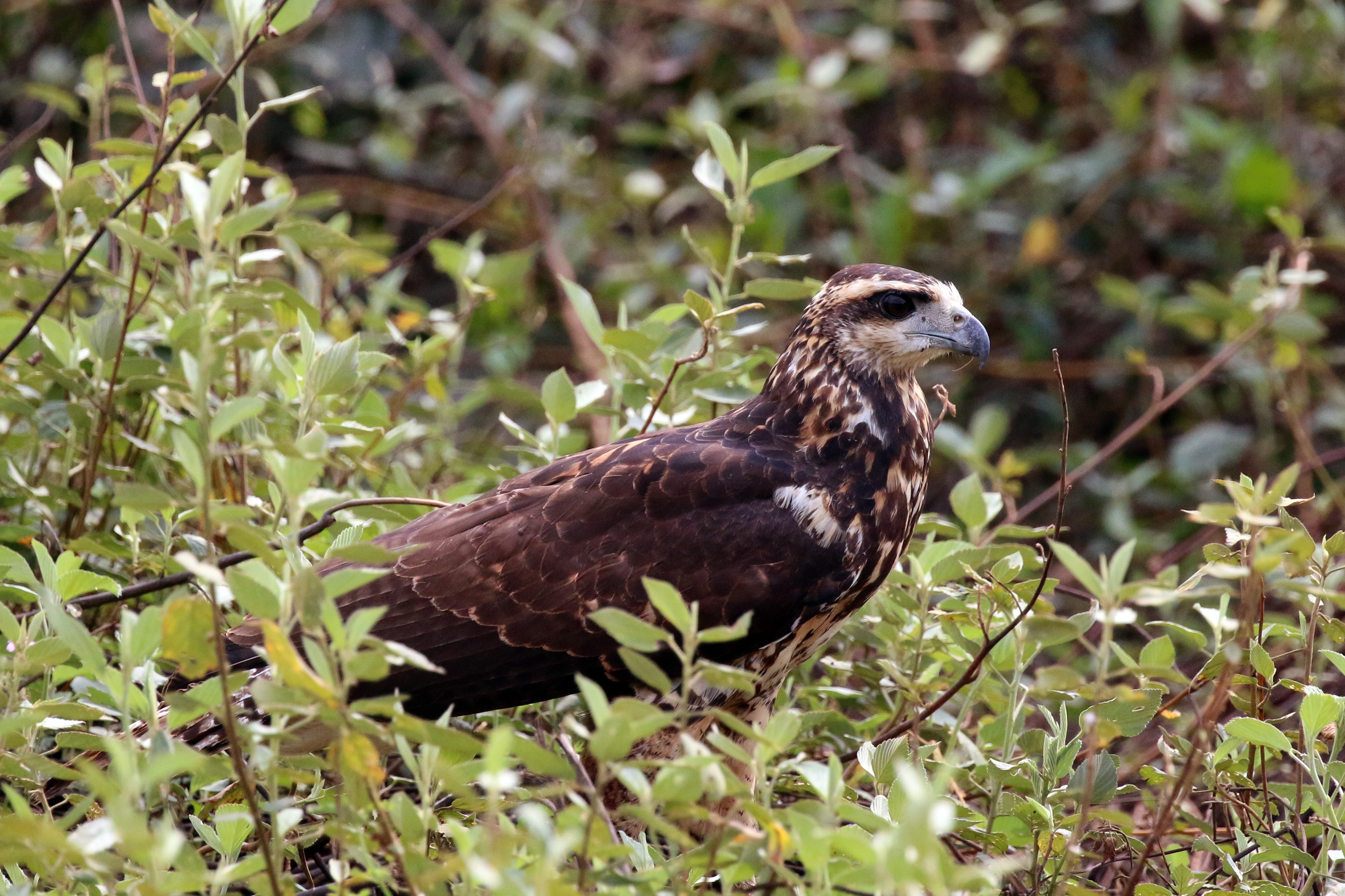
Great black hawk

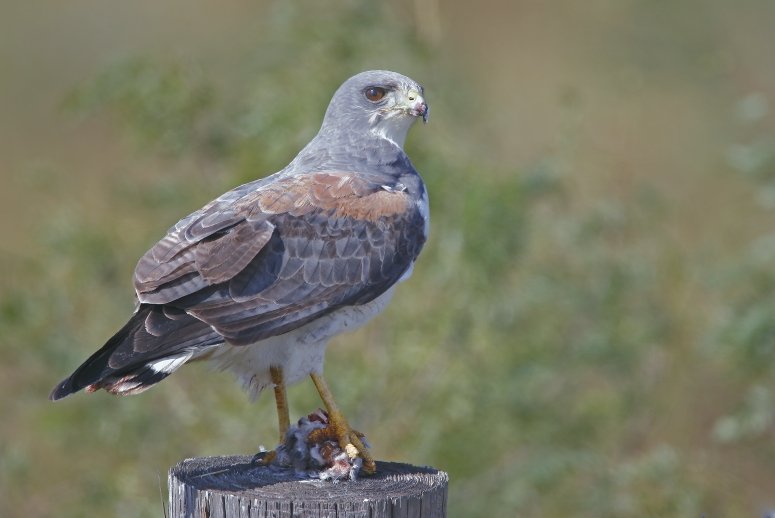
White-tailed hawk

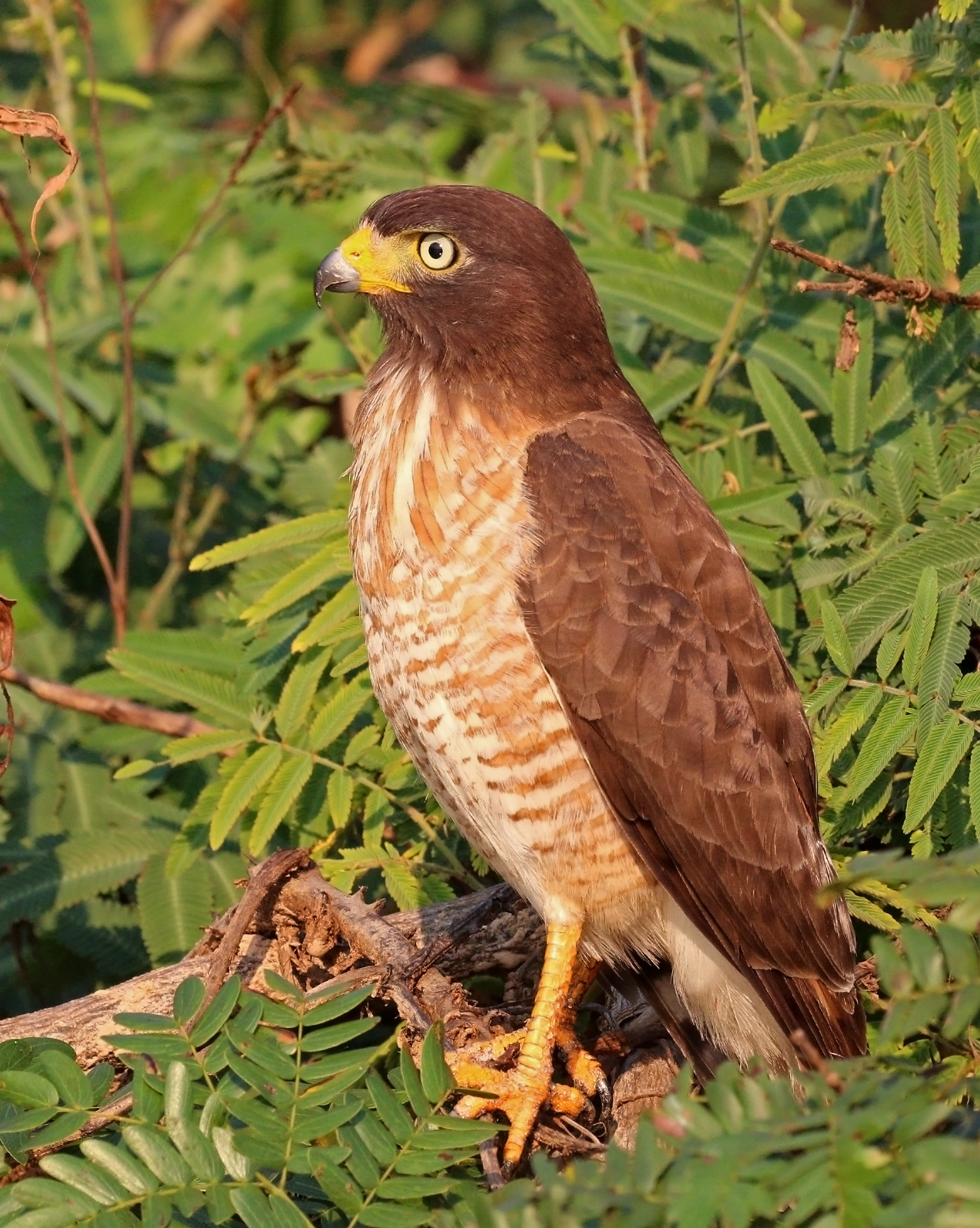
Roadside hawk

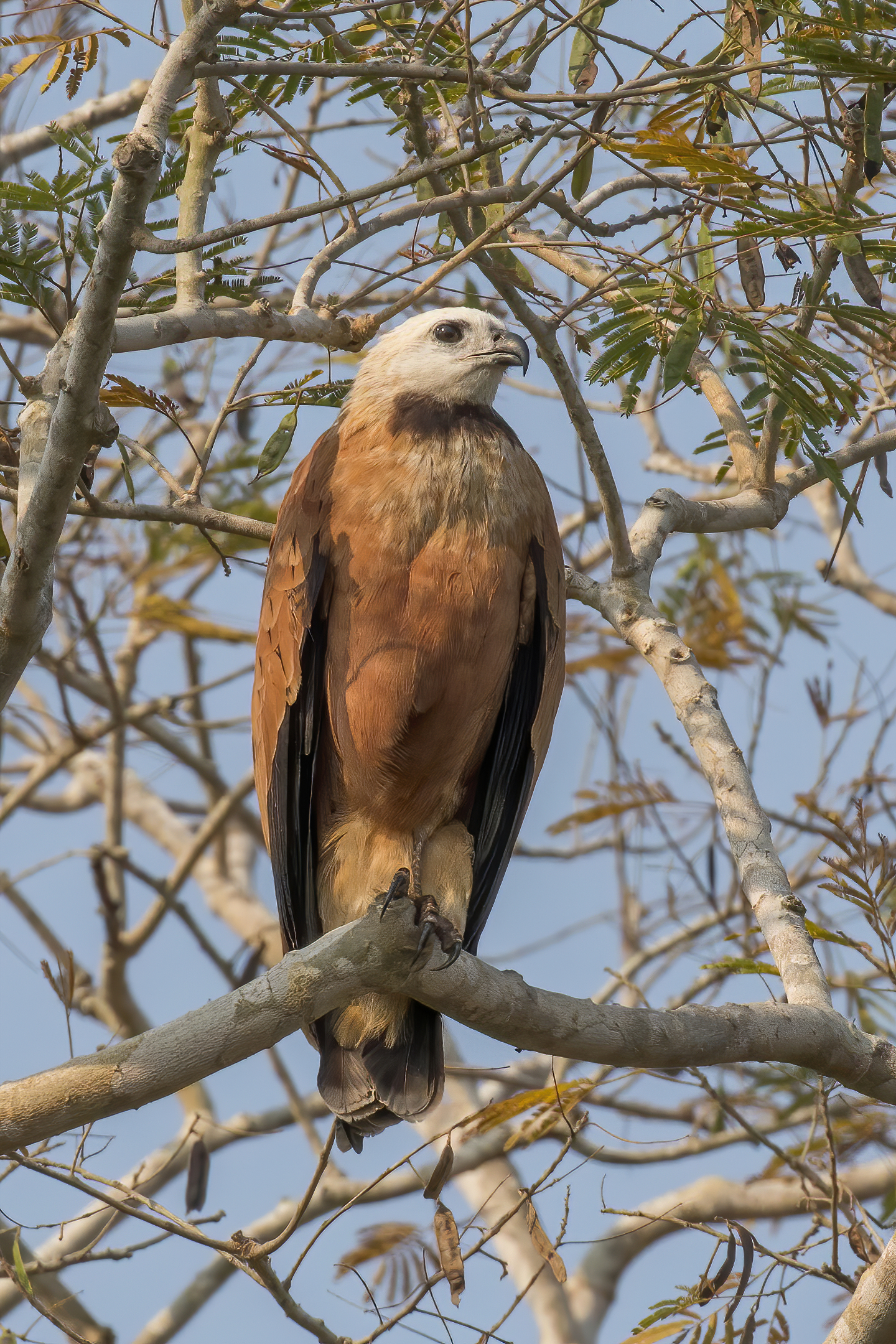
Black-collared hawk

== Barn owls ==
Order: Strigiformes Family: Tytonidae

Barn owls are medium to large owls with large heads and characteristic heart-shaped faces. They have long strong legs with powerful talons.

- American barn owl, Tyto furcata

== Owls ==
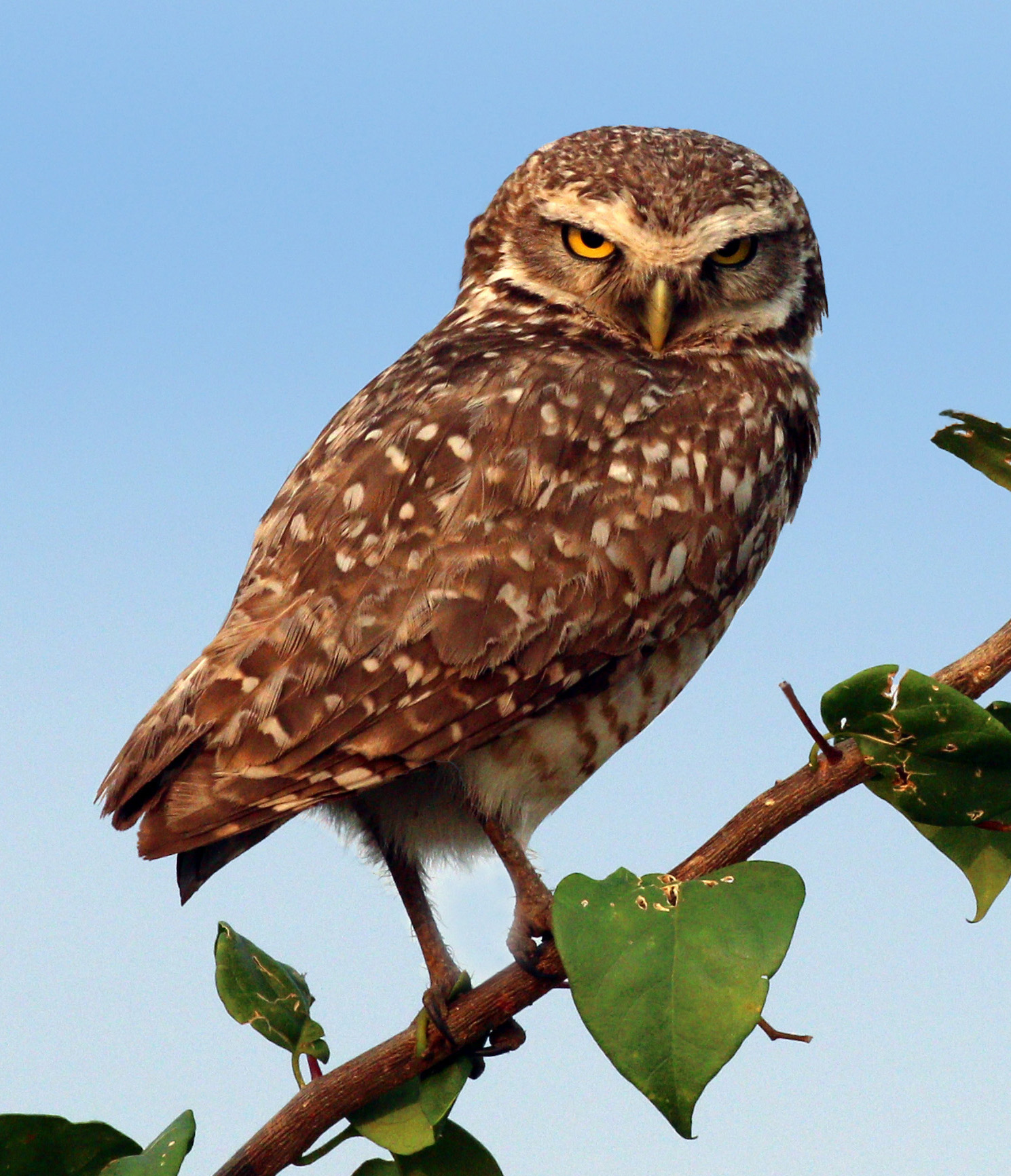
Burrowing owl

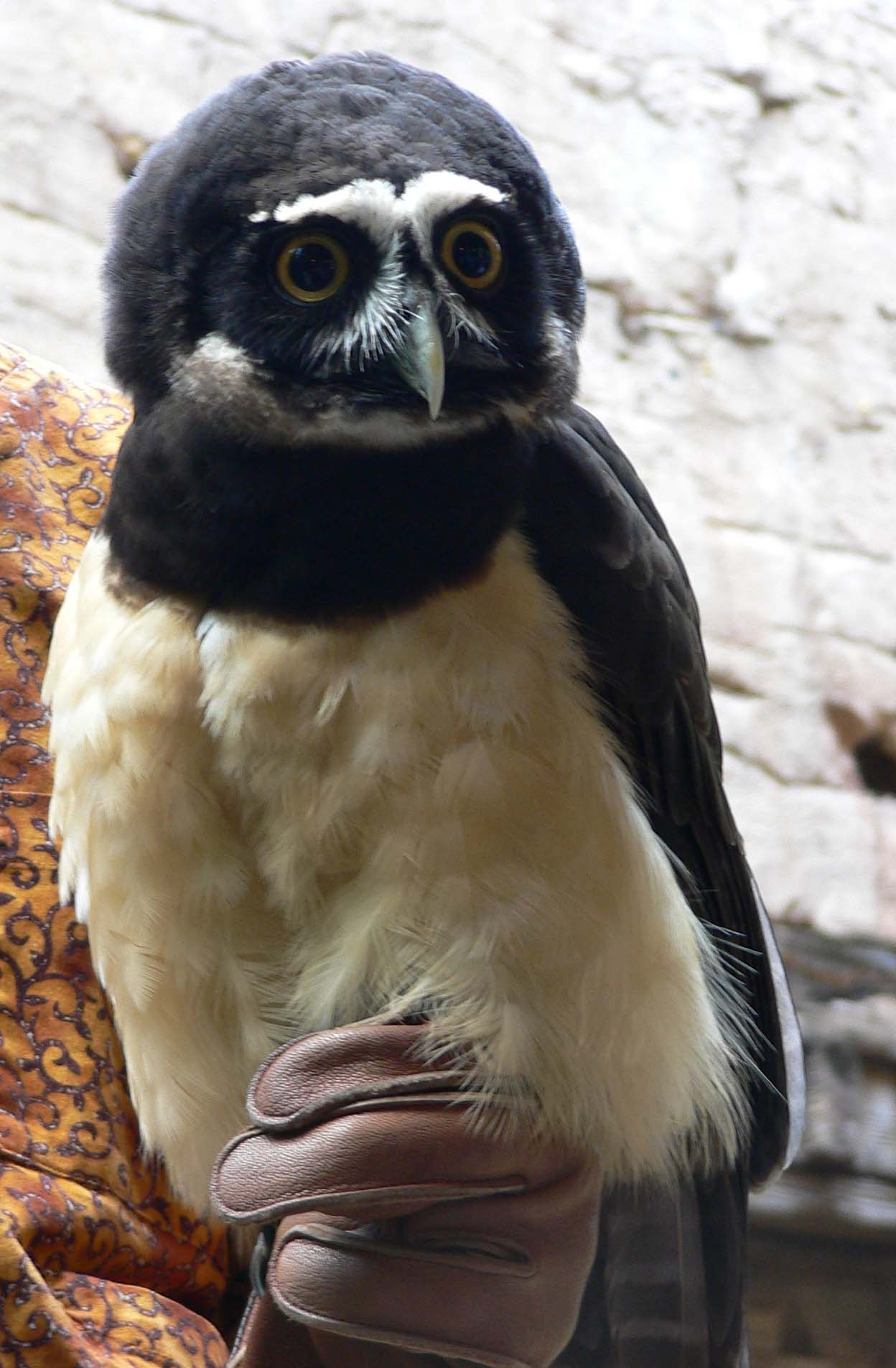
Spectacled owl

Order: Strigiformes Family: Strigidae

The typical owls are small to large solitary nocturnal birds of prey. They have large forward-facing eyes and ears, a hawk-like beak, and a conspicuous circle of feathers around each eye called a facial disk.

- Tropical screech-owl, Megascops choliba
- Foothill screech-owl, Megascops roraimae
- Long-tufted screech-owl, Megascops sanctaecatarinae
- Tawny-bellied screech-owl, Megascops watsonii
- Black-capped screech-owl, Megascops atricapilla
- Crested owl, Lophostrix cristata
- Spectacled owl, Pulsatrix perspicillata
- Tawny-browed owl, Pulsatrix koeniswaldiana
- Tropical horned owl, Bubo nacurutu
- Mottled owl, Strix virgata
- Black-banded owl, Strix huhula
- Amazonian pygmy-owl, Glaucidium hardyi
- Pernambuco pygmy-owl, Glaucidium mooreorum (E) (critically endangered, possibly extinct)
- Least pygmy-owl, Glaucidium minutissimum (E)
- Ferruginous pygmy-owl, Glaucidium brasilianum
- Burrowing owl, Athene cunicularia
- Buff-fronted owl, Aegolius harrisii
- Striped owl, Asio clamator
- Stygian owl, Asio stygius
- Short-eared owl, Asio flammeus

== Trogons ==
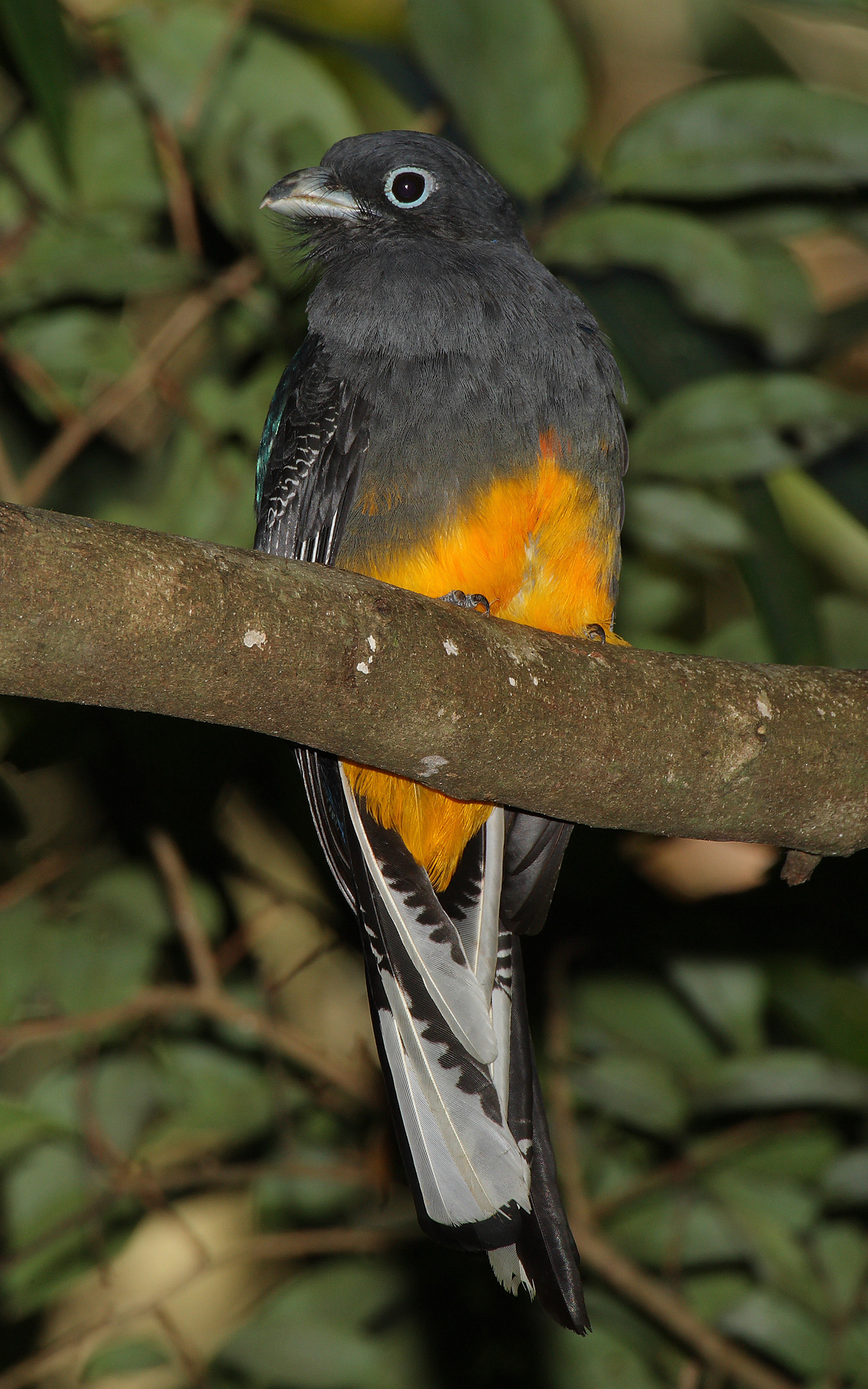
Green-backed trogon

Order: Trogoniformes Family: Trogonidae

The family Trogonidae includes trogons and quetzals. Found in tropical woodlands worldwide, they feed on insects and fruit, and their broad bills and weak legs reflect their diet and arboreal habits. Although their flight is fast, they are reluctant to fly any distance. Trogons have soft, often colorful, feathers with distinctive male and female plumage.

- Pavonine quetzal, Pharomachrus pavoninus
- Black-tailed trogon, Trogon melanurus
- Green-backed trogon, Trogon viridis
- Amazonian violaceous-trogon, Trogon ramonianus
- Guianan violaceous-trogon, Trogon violaceus
- Blue-crowned trogon, Trogon curucui
- Surucua trogon, Trogon surrucura
- Amazonian black-throated trogon, Trogon rufus
- Atlantic black-throated trogon, Trogon chrysochloros
- Collared trogon, Trogon collaris
- Masked trogon, Trogon personatus

== Motmots ==
Order: Coraciiformes Family: Momotidae

The motmots have colorful plumage and long, graduated tails which they display by waggling back and forth. In most of the species, the barbs near the ends of the two longest (central) tail feathers are weak and fall off, leaving a length of bare shaft and creating a racket-shaped tail.

- Broad-billed motmot, Electron platyrhynchum
- Rufous motmot, Baryphthengus martii
- Rufous-capped motmot, Baryphthengus ruficapillus
- Amazonian motmot, Momotus momota

== Kingfishers ==
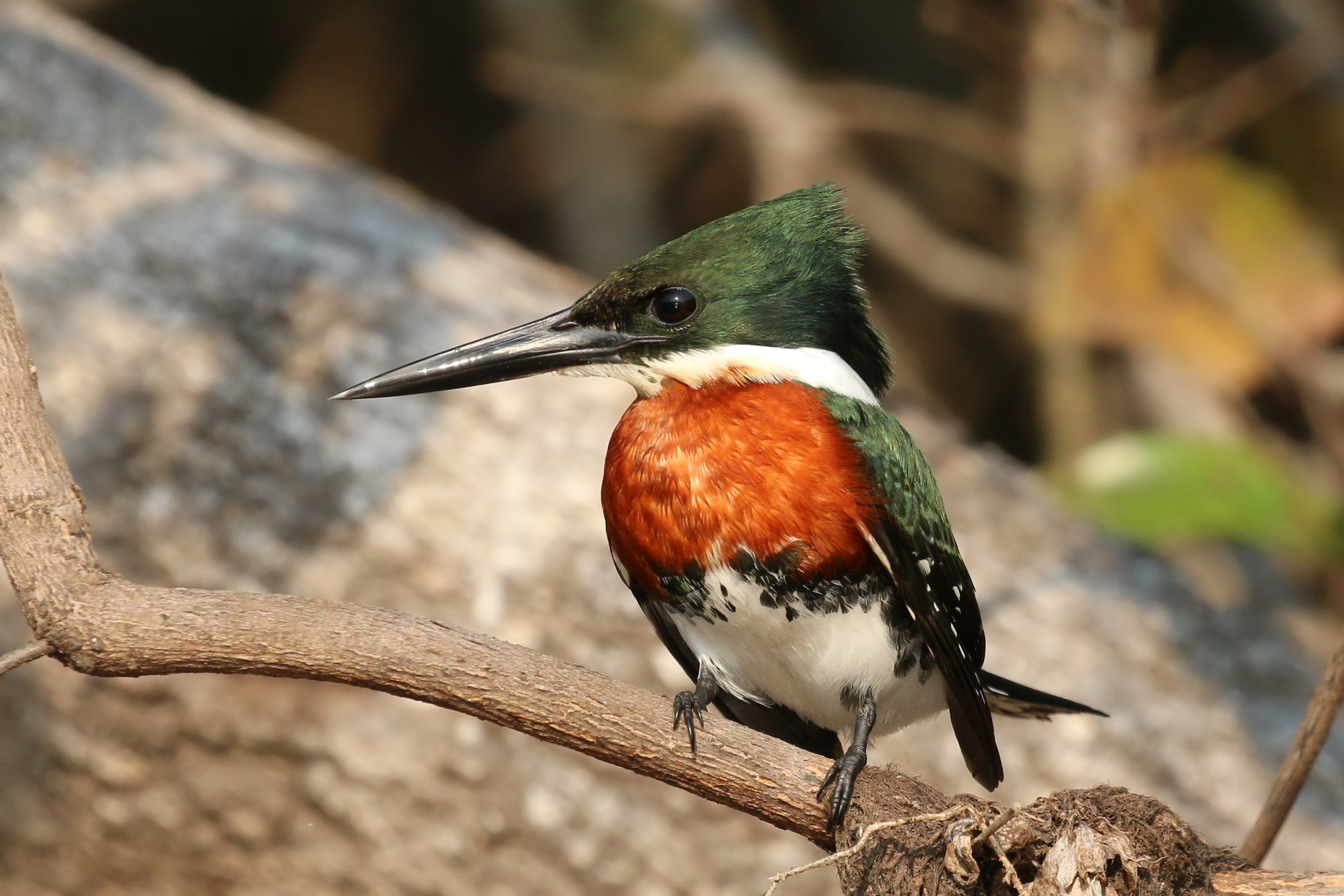
Green kingfisher

Order: Coraciiformes Family: Alcedinidae

Kingfishers are medium-sized birds with large heads, long pointed bills, short legs, and stubby tails.

- Ringed kingfisher, Megaceryle torquata
- Amazon kingfisher, Chloroceryle amazona
- American pygmy kingfisher, Chloroceryle aenea
- Green kingfisher, Chloroceryle americana
- Green-and-rufous kingfisher, Chloroceryle inda

== Jacamars ==
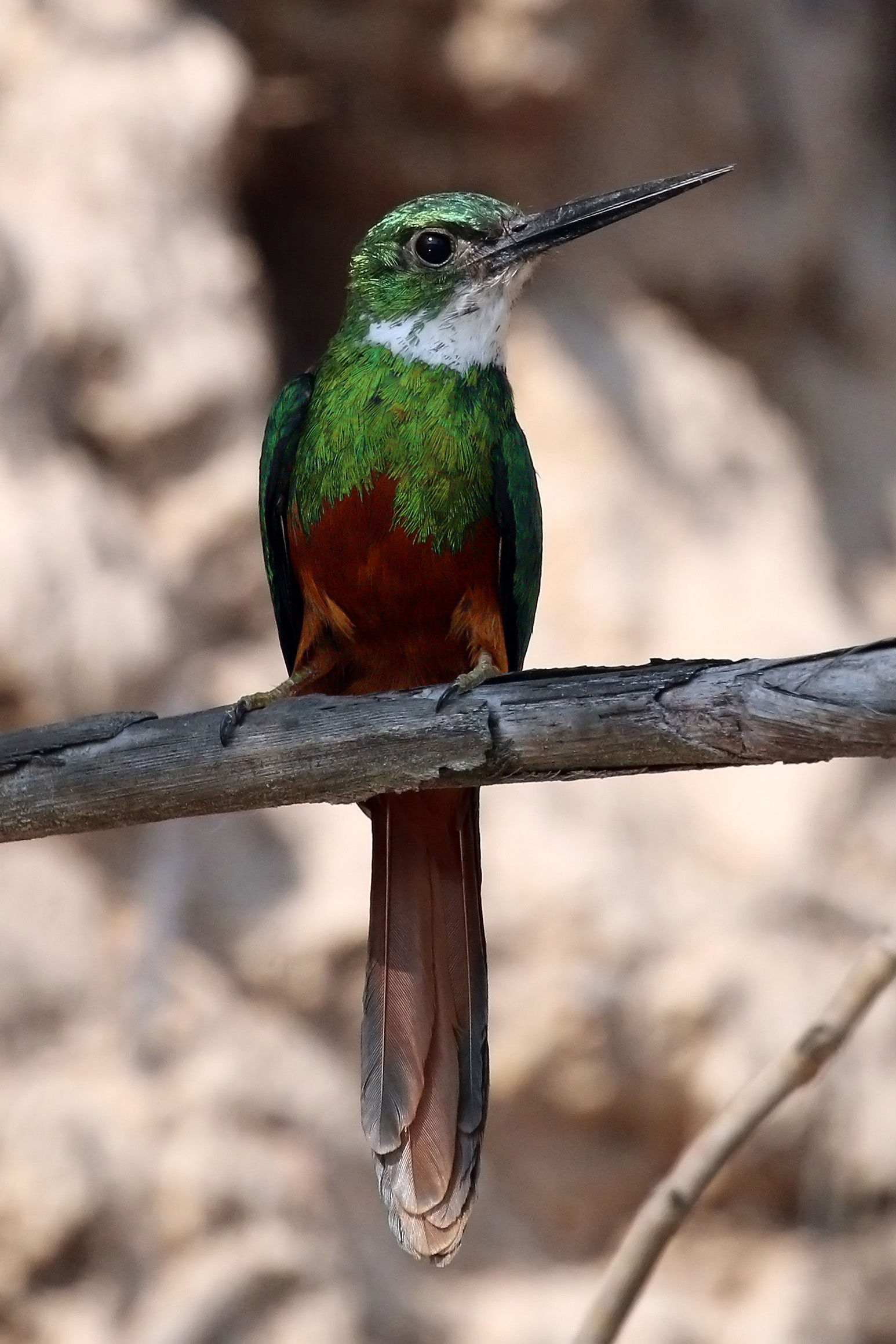
Rufous-tailed jacamar

Order: Galbuliformes Family: Galbulidae

The jacamars are near passerine birds from tropical South America with a range that extends up to Mexico. They feed on insects caught on the wing and are glossy, elegant birds with long bills and tails. They resemble the Old World bee-eaters, although they are more closely related to puffbirds.

- White-eared jacamar, Galbalcyrhynchus leucotis
- Purus jacamar, Galbalcyrhynchus purusianus
- White-throated jacamar, Brachygalba albogularis
- Brown jacamar, Brachygalba lugubris
- Three-toed jacamar, Jacamaralcyon tridactyla (E) (vulnerable)
- Yellow-billed jacamar, Galbula albirostris
- Blue-cheeked jacamar, Galbula cyanicollis
- Rufous-tailed jacamar, Galbula ruficauda
- Green-tailed jacamar, Galbula galbula
- White-chinned jacamar, Galbula tombacea
- Bluish-fronted jacamar, Galbula cyanescens
- Purplish jacamar, Galbula chalcothorax
- Bronzy jacamar, Galbula leucogastra
- Paradise jacamar, Galbula dea
- Great jacamar, Jacamerops aureus

== Puffbirds ==
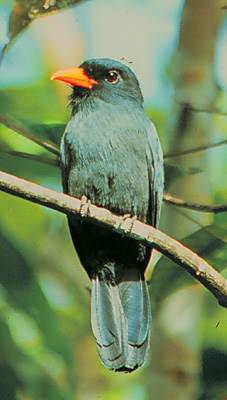
Black-fronted nunbird

Order: Galbuliformes Family: Bucconidae

The puffbirds are related to the jacamars and have the same range, but lack the iridescent colors of that family. They are mainly brown, rufous, or gray, with large heads and flattened bills with hooked tips. The loose abundant plumage and short tails makes them look stout and puffy, giving rise to the English common name of the family.

- White-necked puffbird, Notharchus hyperrhynchus
- Guianan puffbird, Notharchus macrorhynchos
- Buff-bellied puffbird, Notharchus swainsoni
- Brown-banded puffbird, Notharchus ordii
- Pied puffbird, Notharchus tectus
- Chestnut-capped puffbird, Bucco macrodactylus
- Spotted puffbird, Bucco tamatia
- Collared puffbird, Bucco capensis
- Western striolated-puffbird, Nystalus obamai
- Eastern striolated-puffbird, Nystalus striolatus
- White-eared puffbird, Nystalus chacuru
- Spot-backed puffbird, Nystalus maculatus
- White-chested puffbird, Malacoptila fusca
- Semicollared puffbird, Malacoptila semicincta
- Crescent-chested puffbird, Malacoptila striata (E)
- Rufous-necked puffbird, Malacoptila rufa
- Lanceolated monklet, Micromonacha lanceolata
- Rusty-breasted nunlet, Nonnula rubecula
- Fulvous-chinned nunlet, Nonnula sclateri
- Rufous-capped nunlet, Nonnula ruficapilla
- Chestnut-headed nunlet, Nonnula amaurocephala (E)
- Black nunbird, Monasa atra
- Black-fronted nunbird, Monasa nigrifrons
- White-fronted nunbird, Monasa morphoeus
- Yellow-billed nunbird, Monasa flavirostris
- Swallow-winged puffbird, Chelidoptera tenebrosa

== New World barbets ==
Order: Piciformes Family: Capitonidae

The barbets are plump birds, with short necks and large heads. They get their name from the bristles which fringe their heavy bills. Most species are brightly colored.

- Scarlet-crowned barbet, Capito aurovirens
- Black-girdled barbet, Capito dayi
- Brown-chested barbet, Capito brunneipectus (E)
- Black-spotted barbet, Capito niger
- Gilded barbet, Capito auratus
- Lemon-throated barbet, Eubucco richardsoni
- Scarlet-hooded barbet, Eubucco tucinkae

== Toucans ==
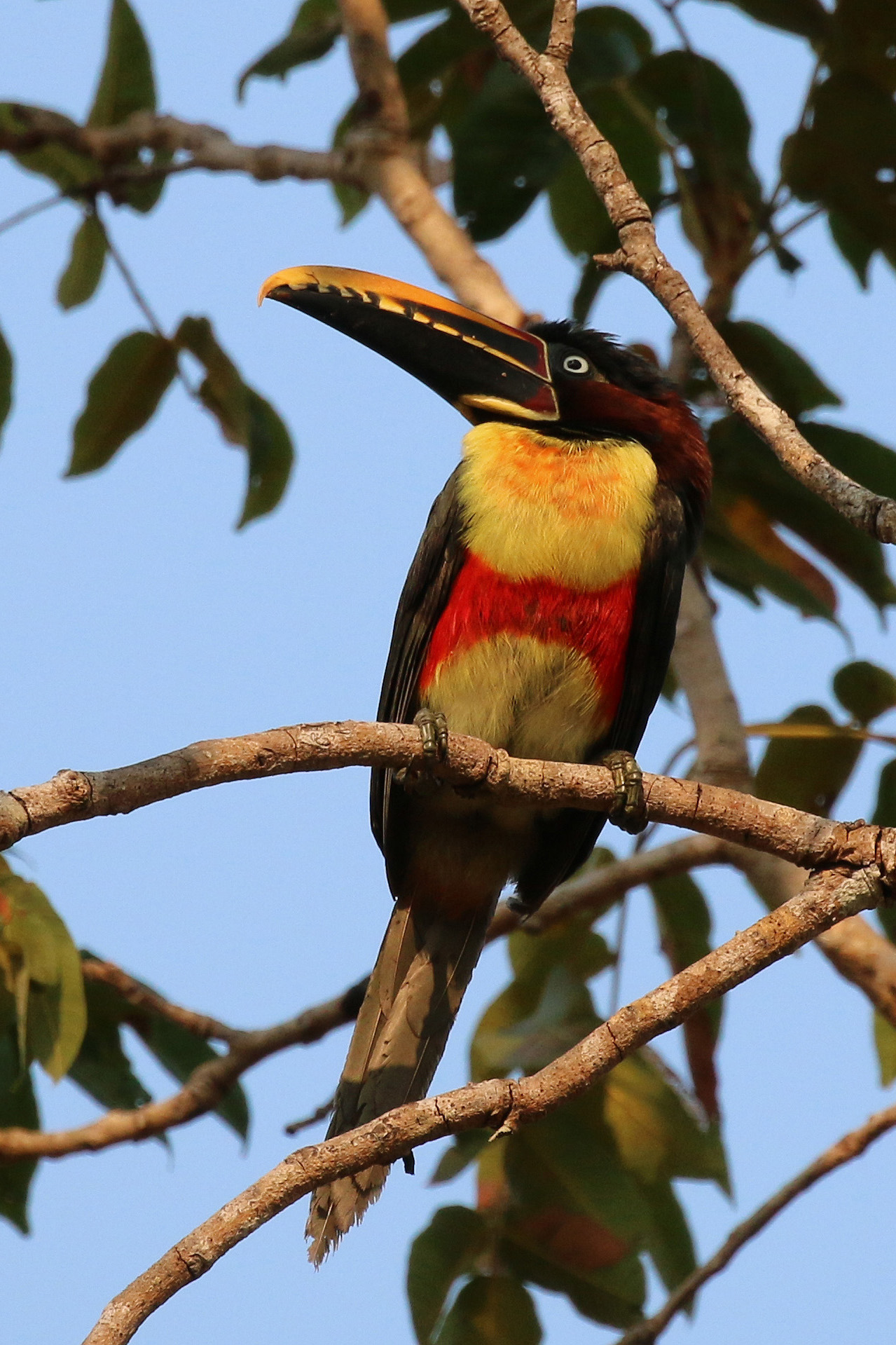
Chestnut-eared aracari

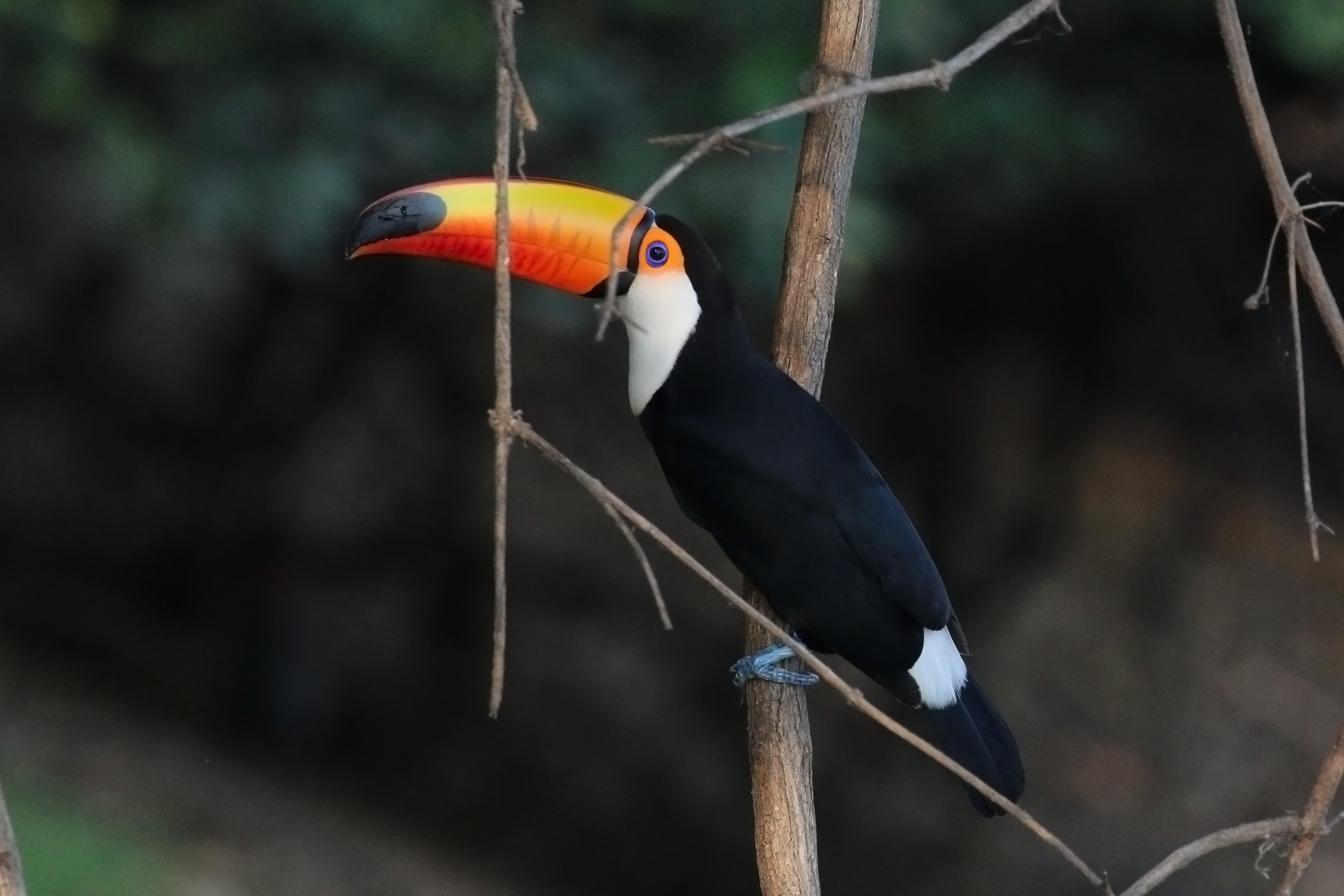
Toco toucan

Order: Piciformes Family: Ramphastidae

Toucans are near passerine birds from the Neotropics. They are brightly marked and have enormous, colorful bills which in some species amount to half their body length.

- Southern emerald-toucanet, Aulacorhynchus albivitta
- Tepui toucanet, Aulacorhynchus whitelianus
- Saffron toucanet, Pteroglossus bailloni (near-threatened)
- Green aracari, Pteroglossus viridis
- Lettered aracari, Pteroglossus inscriptus
- Black-necked aracari, Pteroglossus aracari
- Chestnut-eared aracari, Pteroglossus castanotis
- Many-banded aracari, Pteroglossus pluricinctus
- Ivory-billed aracari, Pteroglossus azara
- Curl-crested aracari, Pteroglossus beauharnaisii
- Red-necked aracari, Pteroglossus bitorquatus
- Guianan toucanet, Selenidera piperivora
- Golden-collared toucanet, Selenidera reinwardtii
- Tawny-tufted toucanet, Selenidera nattereri
- Gould's toucanet, Selenidera gouldii
- Spot-billed toucanet, Selenidera maculirostris
- Toco toucan, Ramphastos toco
- White-throated toucan, Ramphastos tucanus
- Channel-billed toucan, Ramphastos vitellinus
- Red-breasted toucan, Ramphastos dicolorus

== Woodpeckers ==
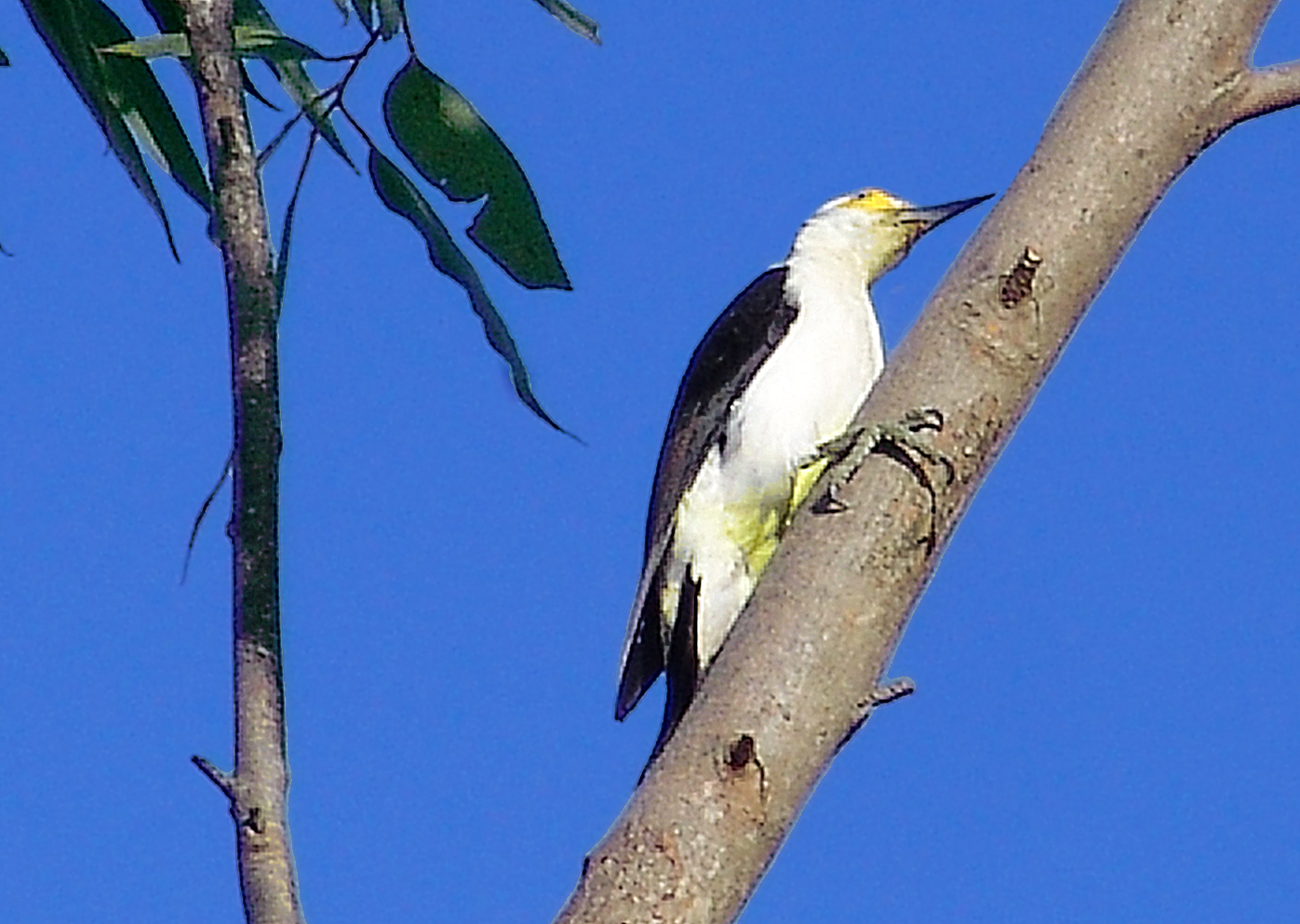
White woodpecker

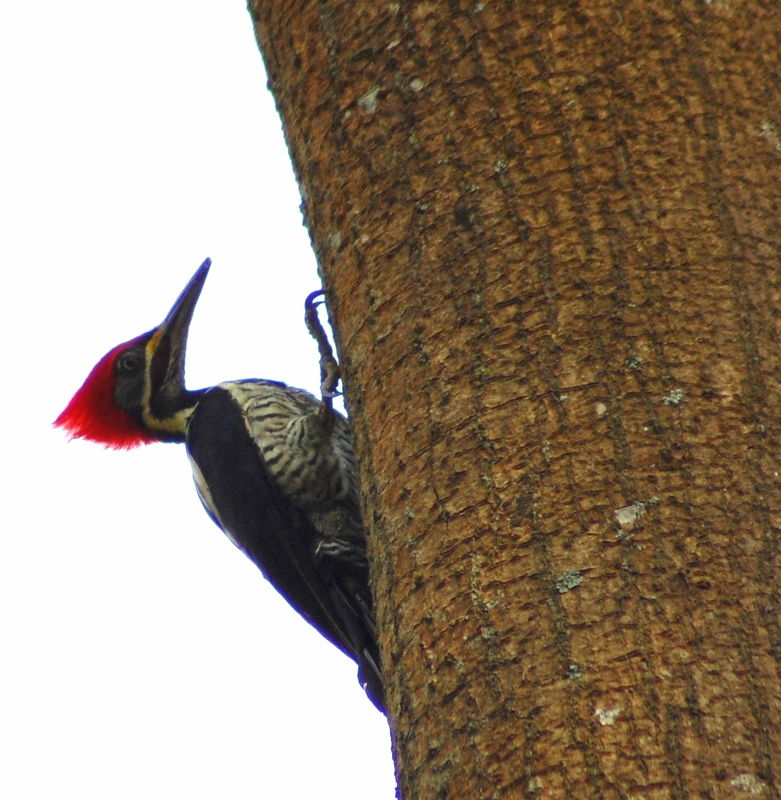
Lineated woodpecker

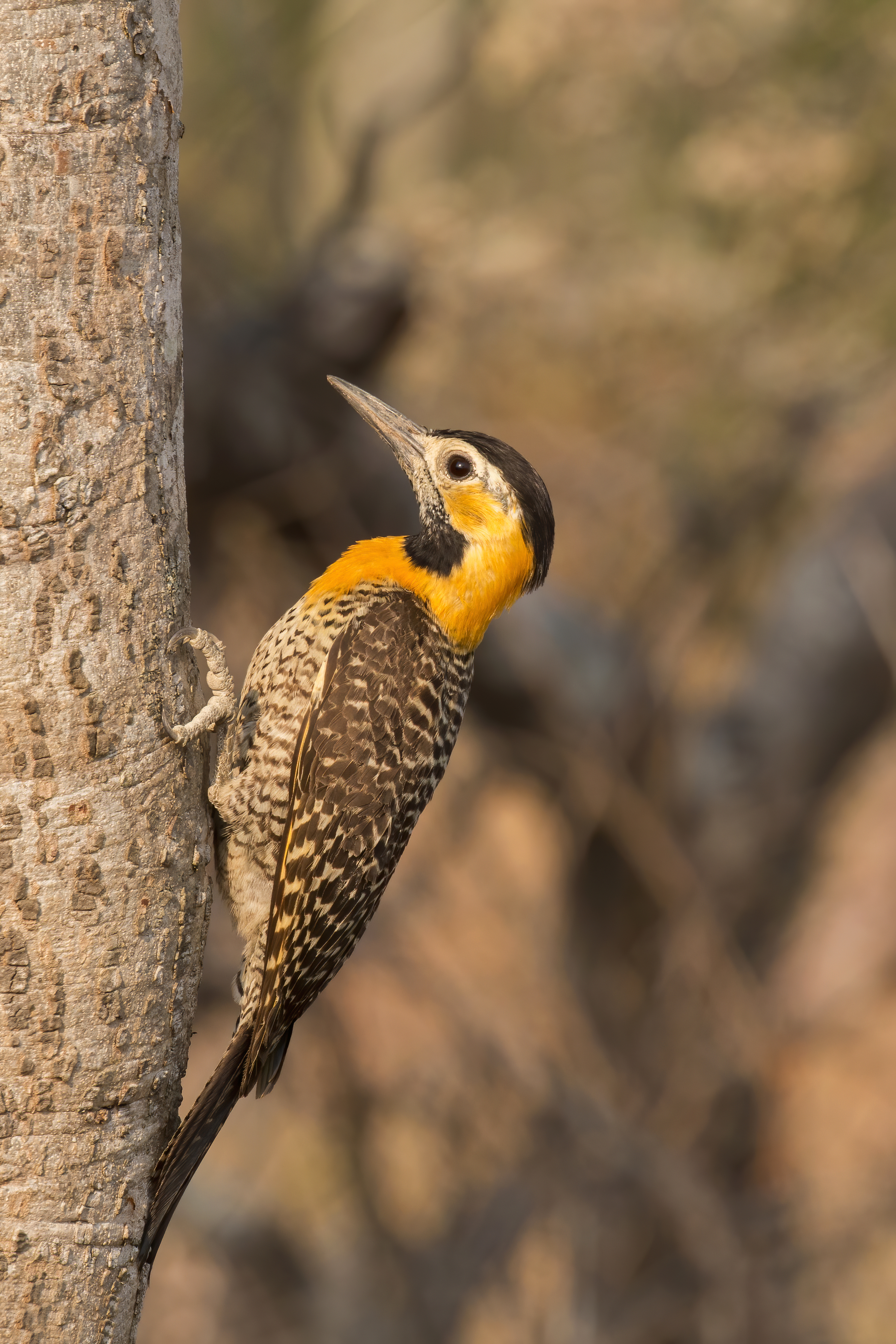
Campo flicker

Order: Piciformes Family: Picidae

Woodpeckers are small to medium-sized birds with chisel-like beaks, short legs, stiff tails, and long tongues used for capturing insects. Some species have feet with two toes pointing forward and two backward, while several species have only three toes. Many woodpeckers have the habit of tapping noisily on tree trunks with their beaks.

- Bar-breasted piculet, Picumnus aurifrons
- Orinoco piculet, Picumnus pumilus
- Lafresnaye's piculet, Picumnus lafresnayi
- Golden-spangled piculet, Picumnus exilis
- White-bellied piculet, Picumnus spilogaster
- Ochraceous piculet, Picumnus limae (E)
- Spotted piculet, Picumnus pygmaeus (E)
- Varzea piculet, Picumnus varzeae (E)
- White-barred piculet, Picumnus cirratus
- Ochre-collared piculet, Picumnus temminckii
- White-wedged piculet, Picumnus albosquamatus
- Rusty-necked piculet, Picumnus fuscus
- Rufous-breasted piculet, Picumnus rufiventris (threatened)
- Mottled piculet, Picumnus nebulosus (near-threatened)
- Plain-breasted piculet, Picumnus castelnau
- Fine-barred piculet, Picumnus subtilis
- White woodpecker, Melanerpes candidus
- Yellow-tufted woodpecker, Melanerpes cruentatus
- Yellow-fronted woodpecker, Melanerpes flavifrons
- White-fronted woodpecker, Melanerpes cactorum
- Red-rumped woodpecker, Dryobates kirkii
- Golden-collared woodpecker, Dryobates cassini
- White-spotted woodpecker, Dryobates spilogaster
- Checkered woodpecker, Dryobates mixtus
- Little woodpecker, Dryobates passerinus
- Red-stained woodpecker, Dryobates affinis
- Yellow-eared woodpecker, Dryobates maculifrons (E)
- Red-necked woodpecker, Campephilus rubricollis
- Robust woodpecker, Campephilus robustus
- Crimson-crested woodpecker, Campephilus melanoleucos
- Cream-backed woodpecker, Campephilus leucopogon
- Lineated woodpecker, Dryocopus lineatus
- Ringed woodpecker, Celeus torquatus
- Helmeted woodpecker, Celeus galeatus (vulnerable)
- Variable woodpecker, Celeus undatus
- Cream-colored woodpecker, Celeus flavus
- Rufous-headed woodpecker, Celeus spectabilis
- Kaempfer's woodpecker, Celeus obrieni (E)
- Ochre-backed woodpecker, Celeus ochraceus (E)
- Chestnut woodpecker, Celeus elegans
- Pale-crested woodpecker, Celeus lugubris
- Blond-crested woodpecker, Celeus flavescens
- White-throated woodpecker, Piculus leucolaemus
- Yellow-throated woodpecker, Piculus flavigula
- Golden-green woodpecker, Piculus chrysochloros
- White-browed woodpecker, Piculus aurulentus (near-threatened)
- Golden-olive woodpecker, Colaptes rubiginosus
- Spot-breasted woodpecker, Colaptes punctigula
- Green-barred woodpecker, Colaptes melanochloros
- Campo flicker, Colaptes campestris

== Seriemas ==
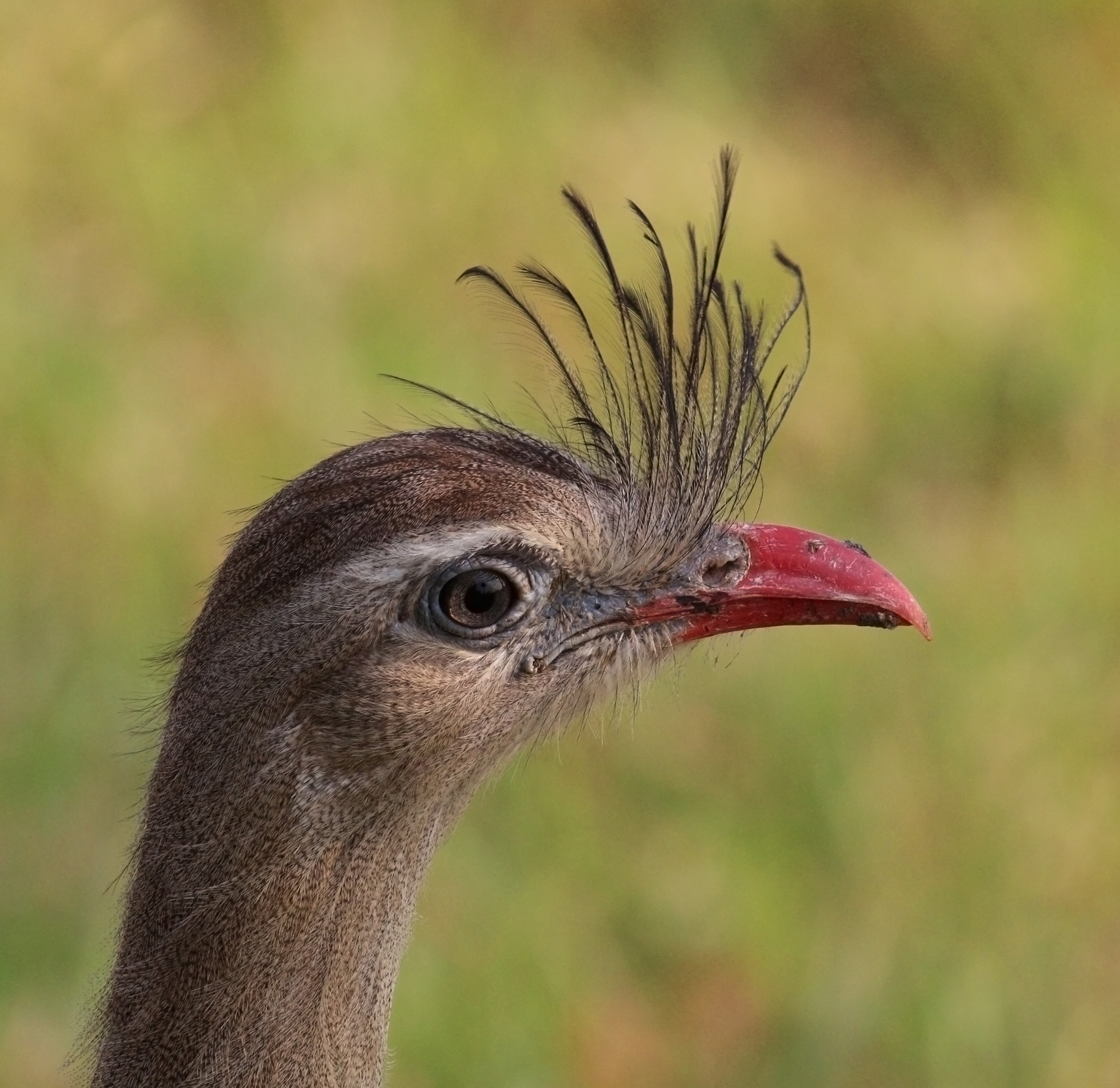
Red-legged seriema

Order: Cariamiformes Family: Cariamidae

The seriemas are terrestrial birds which run rather than fly (though they are able to fly for short distances). They have long legs, necks and tails, but only short wings, reflecting their way of life. They are brownish birds with short bills and erectile crests, found on fairly-dry open grasslands.

- Red-legged seriema, Cariama cristata

== Falcons ==
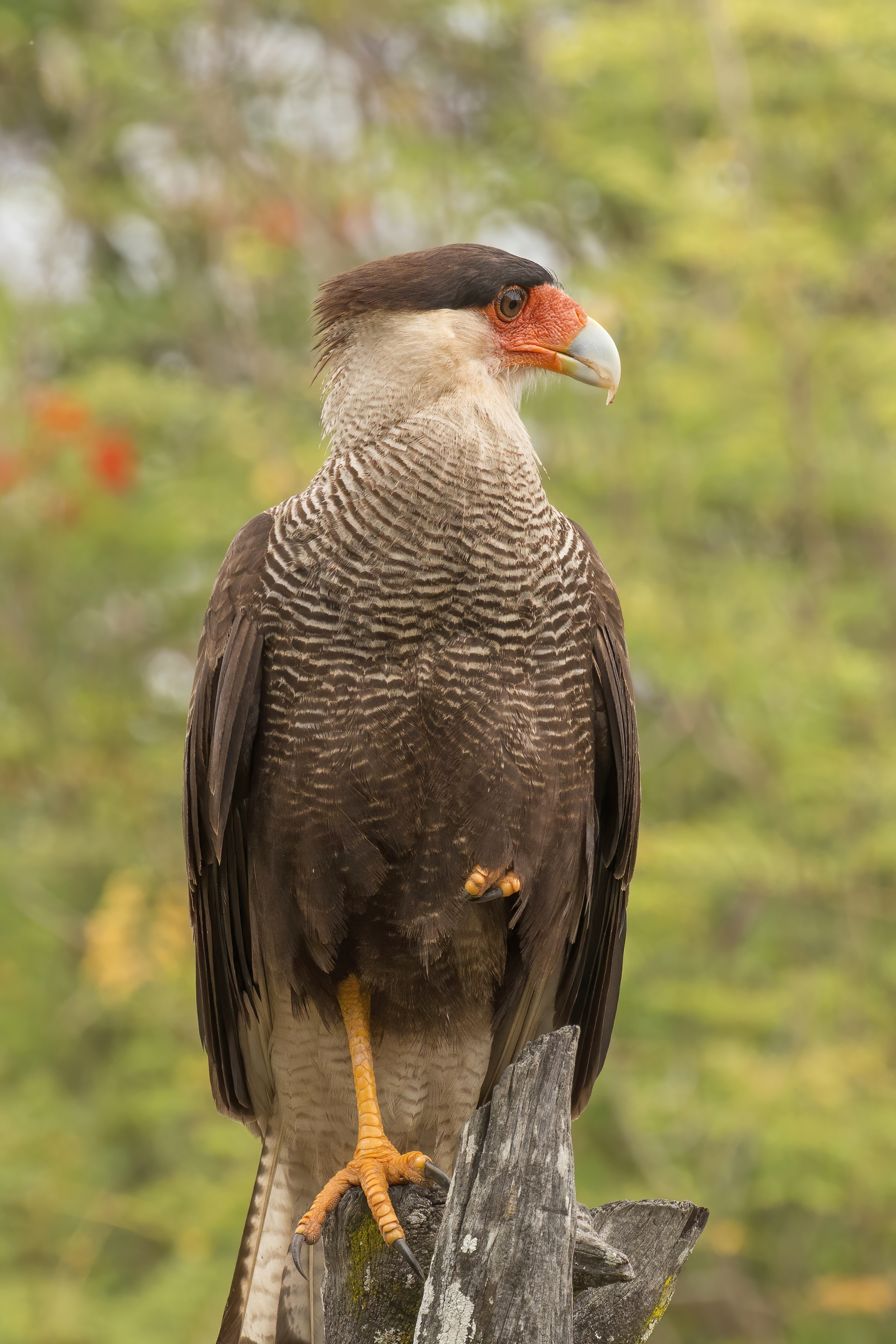
(Southern) crested caracara

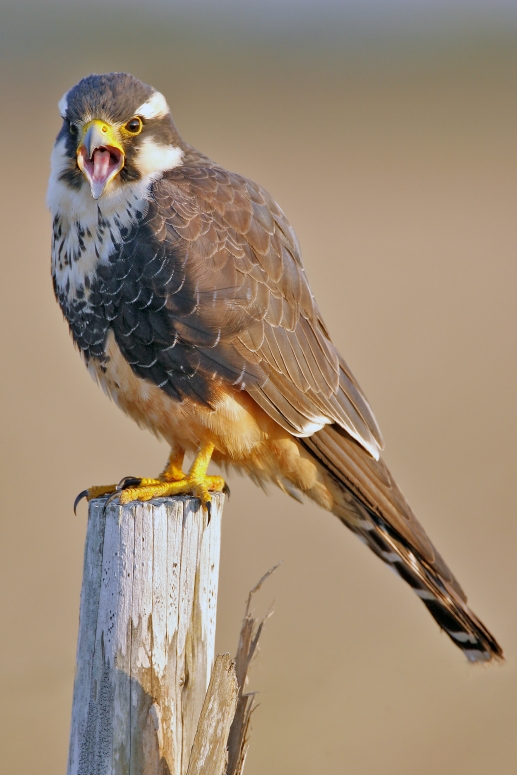
Aplomado falcon

Order: Falconiformes Family: Falconidae

Falconidae is a family of diurnal birds of prey. They differ from hawks, eagles and kites in that they kill with their beaks instead of their talons.

- Laughing falcon, Herpetotheres cachinnans
- Barred forest-falcon, Micrastur ruficollis
- Lined forest-falcon, Micrastur gilvicollis
- Cryptic forest-falcon, Micrastur mintoni
- Slaty-backed forest-falcon, Micrastur mirandollei
- Collared forest-falcon, Micrastur semitorquatus
- Buckley's forest-falcon, Micrastur buckleyi
- Crested caracara, Caracara plancus
- Red-throated caracara, Ibycter americanus
- Black caracara, Daptrius ater
- Yellow-headed caracara, Milvago chimachima
- Chimango caracara, Milvago chimango
- Eurasian kestrel, Falco tinnunculus (V)
- American kestrel, Falco sparverius
- Merlin, Falco columbarius (V)
- Eurasian hobby, Falco subbuteo (UC)(V)
- Bat falcon, Falco rufigularis
- Orange-breasted falcon, Falco deiroleucus
- Aplomado falcon, Falco femoralis
- Peregrine falcon, Falco peregrinus

== New World and African parrots ==
Order: Psittaciformes Family: Psittacidae

Parrots are small to large birds with a characteristic curved beak. Their upper mandibles have slight mobility in the joint with the skull and they have a generally erect stance. All parrots are zygodactyl, having the four toes on each foot placed two at the front and two to the back.

- Scarlet-shouldered parrotlet, Touit huetii
- Sapphire-rumped parrotlet, Touit purpuratus
- Brown-backed parrotlet, Touit melanonotus (E) (vulnerable)
- Golden-tailed parrotlet, Touit surdus (E) (vulnerable)
- Tepui parrotlet, Nannopsittaca panychlora
- Amazonian parrotlet, Nannopsittaca dachilleae
- Monk parakeet, Myiopsitta monachus
- Tui parakeet, Brotogeris sanctithomae
- Plain parakeet, Brotogeris tirica (E)
- Canary-winged parakeet, Brotogeris versicolurus
- Yellow-chevroned parakeet, Brotogeris chiriri
- Cobalt-winged parakeet, Brotogeris cyanoptera
- Golden-winged parakeet, Brotogeris chrysoptera
- Pileated parrot, Pionopsitta pileata
- Blue-bellied parrot, Triclaria malachitacea (E) (near-threatened)
- Orange-cheeked parrot, Pyrilia barrabandi
- Caica parrot, Pyrilia caica
- Bald parrot, Pyrilia aurantiocephala (E)
- Vulturine parrot, Pyrilia vulturina (E)
- Dusky parrot, Pionus fuscus
- Scaly-headed parrot, Pionus maximiliani
- Blue-headed parrot, Pionus menstruus
- Short-tailed parrot, Graydidascalus brachyurus
- Yellow-faced parrot, Alipiopsitta xanthops (near-threatened)
- Festive amazon, Amazona festiva
- Vinaceous-breasted amazon, Amazona vinacea (endangered)
- Red-spectacled amazon, Amazona pretrei (E) (vulnerable)
- Red-lored amazon, Amazona autumnalis
- Blue-cheeked amazon, Amazona dufresniana (near-threatened)
- Red-browed amazon, Amazona rhodocorytha (E) (vulnerable)
- Yellow-crowned amazon, Amazona ochrocephala
- Turquoise-fronted amazon, Amazona aestiva
- Mealy amazon, Amazona farinosa
- Kawall's amazon, Amazona kawalli
- Red-tailed amazon, Amazona brasiliensis (E) (near-threatened)
- Orange-winged amazon, Amazona amazonica
- Dusky-billed parrotlet, Forpus modestus
- Riparian parrotlet, Forpus crassirostris
- Cobalt-rumped parrotlet, Forpus xanthopterygius
- Green-rumped parrotlet, Forpus passerinus
- Black-headed parrot, Pionites melanocephalus
- White-bellied parrot, Pionites leucogaster
- Red-fan parrot, Deroptyus accipitrinus
- Ochre-marked parakeet, Pyrrhura cruentata (E) (vulnerable)
- Blaze-winged parakeet, Pyrrhura devillei
- Maroon-bellied parakeet, Pyrrhura frontalis
- Pearly parakeet, Pyrrhura lepida (E) (vulnerable)
- Crimson-bellied parakeet, Pyrrhura perlata
- Green-cheeked parakeet, Pyrrhura molinae
- Pfrimer's parakeet, Pyrrhura pfrimeri (E)
- Gray-breasted parakeet, Pyrrhura griseipectus (E)
- Maroon-faced parakeet, Pyrrhura leucotis (E)
- Painted parakeet, Pyrrhura picta
- Santarem parakeet, Pyrrhura amazonum
- Bonaparte's parakeet, Pyrrhura lucianii
- Rose-fronted parakeet, Pyrrhura roseifrons
- Fiery-shouldered parakeet, Pyrrhura egregia
- Maroon-tailed parakeet, Pyrrhura melanura
- Black-capped parakeet, Pyrrhura rupicola
- Hyacinth macaw, Anodorhynchus hyacinthinus (vulnerable)
- Glaucous macaw, Anodorhynchus glaucus (critically endangered, possibly extinct)
- Indigo macaw, Anodorhynchus leari (E) (endangered)
- Peach-fronted parakeet, Eupsittula aurea
- Brown-throated parakeet, Eupsittula pertinax
- Cactus parakeet, Eupsittula cactorum (E)
- Dusky-headed parakeet, Aratinga weddellii
- Nanday parakeet, Aratinga nenday
- Sun parakeet, Aratinga solstitialis
- Sulphur-breasted parakeet, Aratinga maculata
- Jandaya parakeet, Aratinga jandaya (E)
- Golden-capped parakeet, Aratinga auricapillus (E)
- Spix's macaw, Cyanopsitta spixii (E) (extinct in the wild)
- Red-bellied macaw, Orthopsittaca manilatus
- Blue-winged macaw, Primolius maracana (near-threatened)
- Blue-headed macaw, Primolius couloni
- Yellow-collared macaw, Primolius auricollis
- Blue-and-yellow macaw, Ara ararauna
- Chestnut-fronted macaw, Ara severus
- Scarlet macaw, Ara macao
- Red-and-green macaw, Ara chloropterus
- Golden parakeet, Guaruba guarouba (E) (vulnerable)
- Blue-crowned parakeet, Thectocercus acuticaudatus
- Red-shouldered macaw, Diopsittaca nobilis
- White-eyed parakeet, Psittacara leucophthalmus
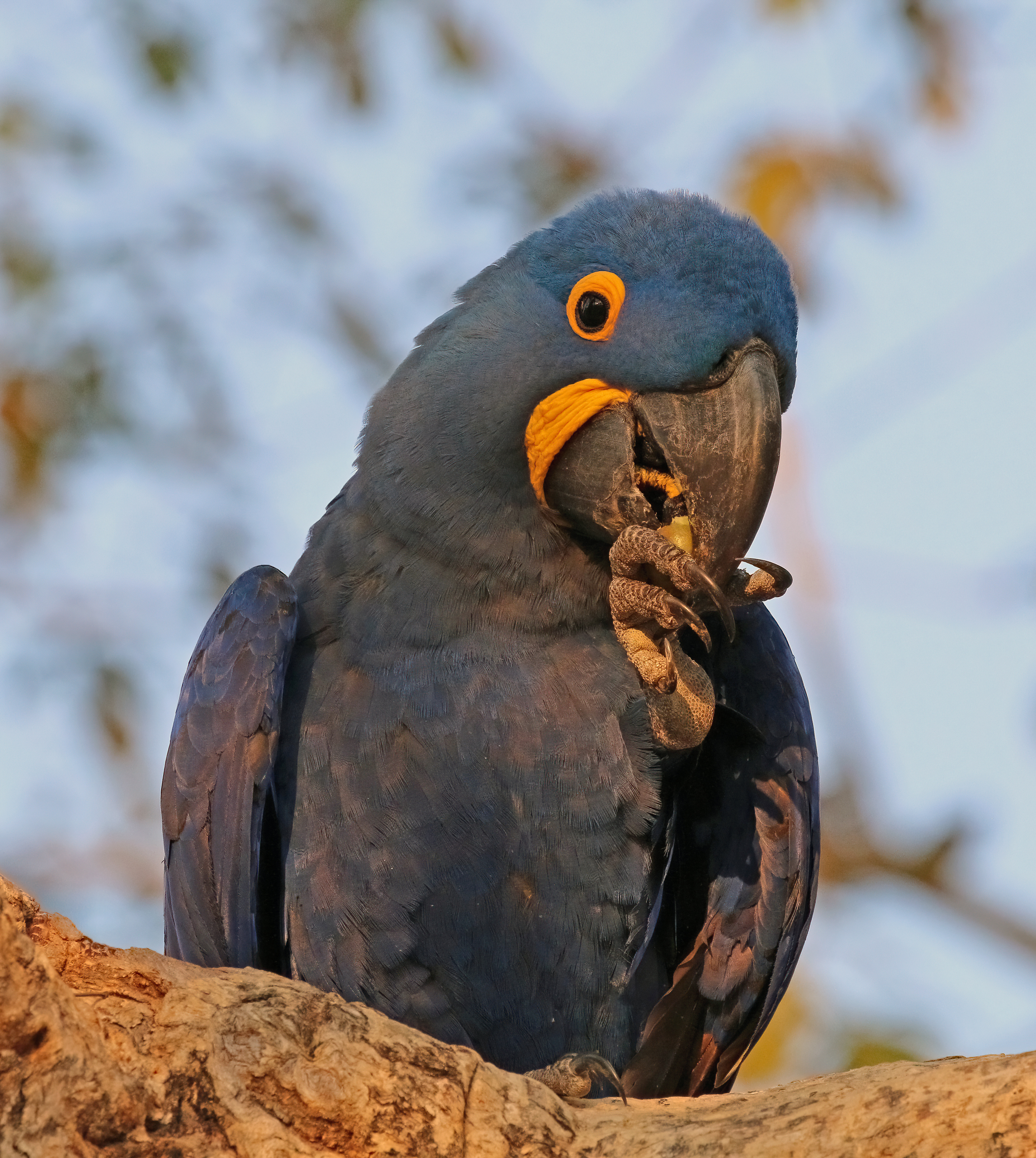
Hyacinth macaw

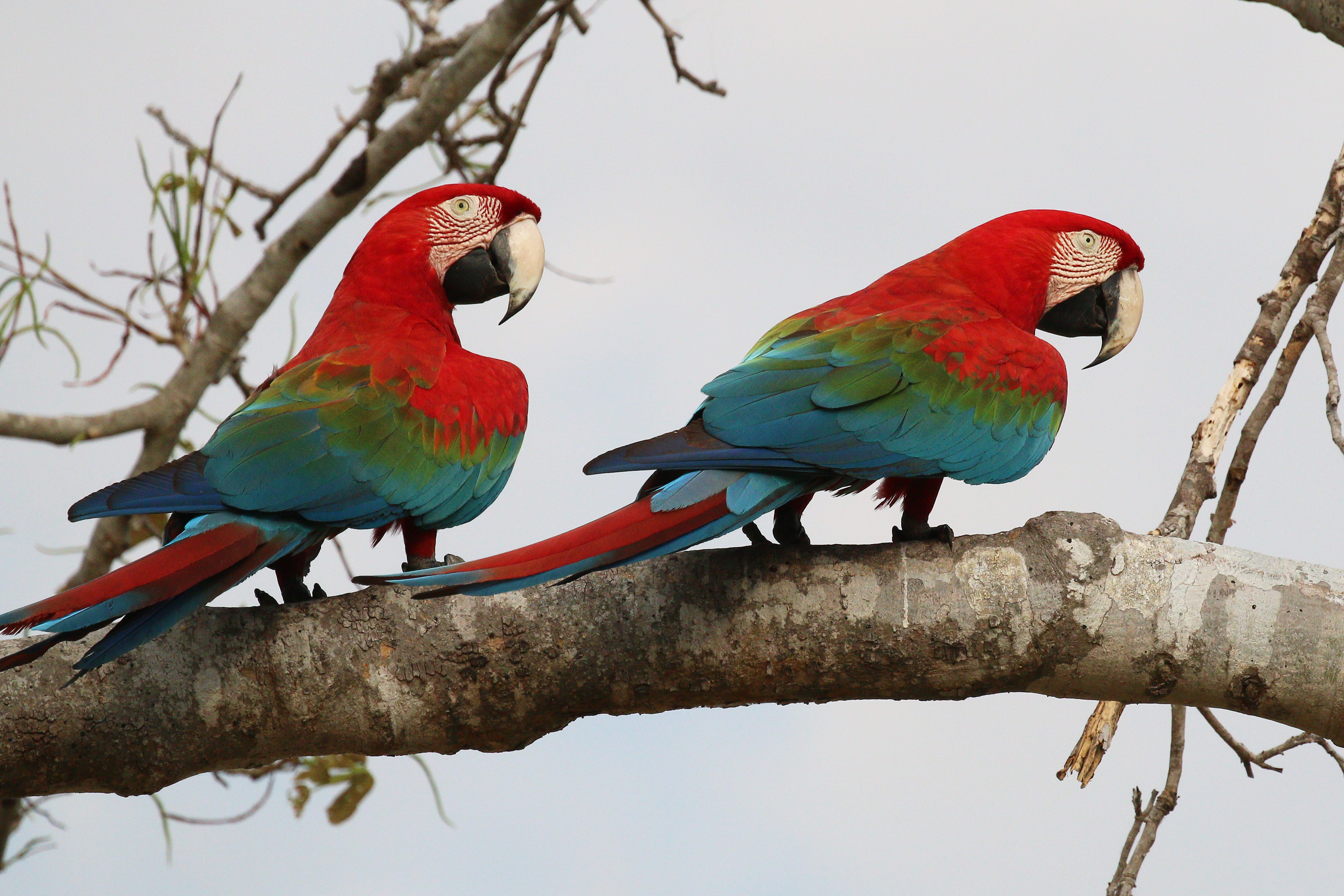
Red-and-green macaws

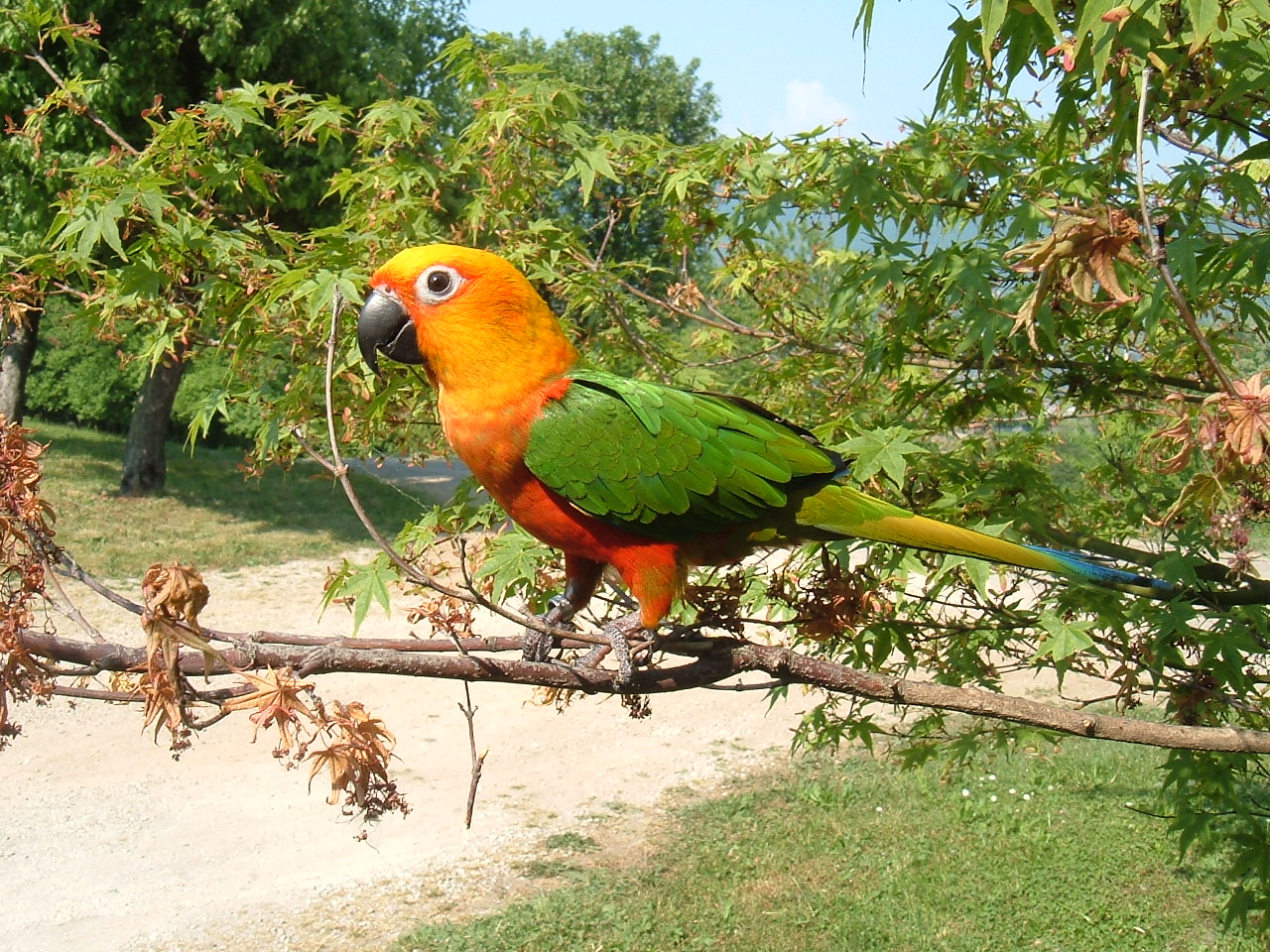
Jandaya parakeet

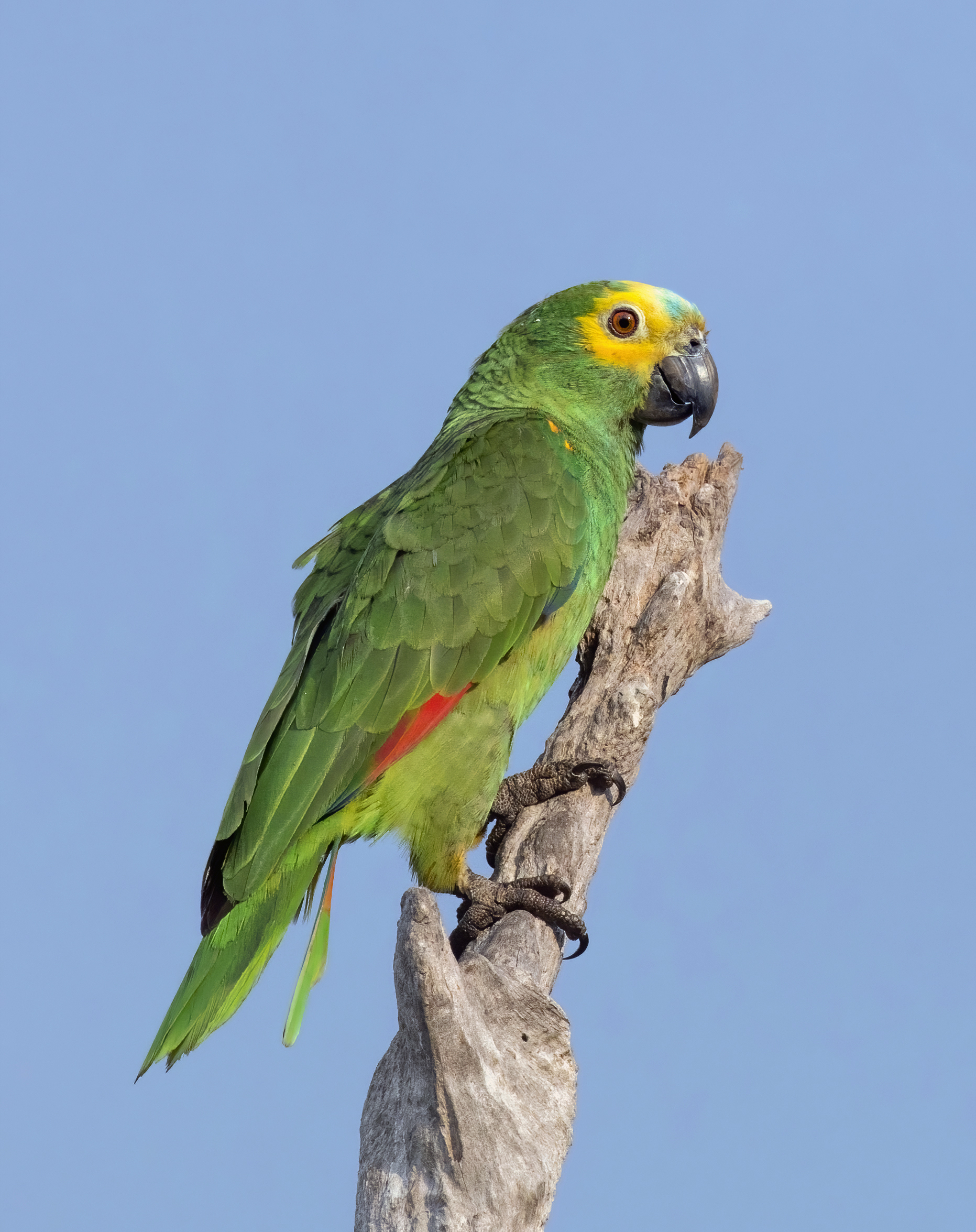
Turquoise-fronted parrot

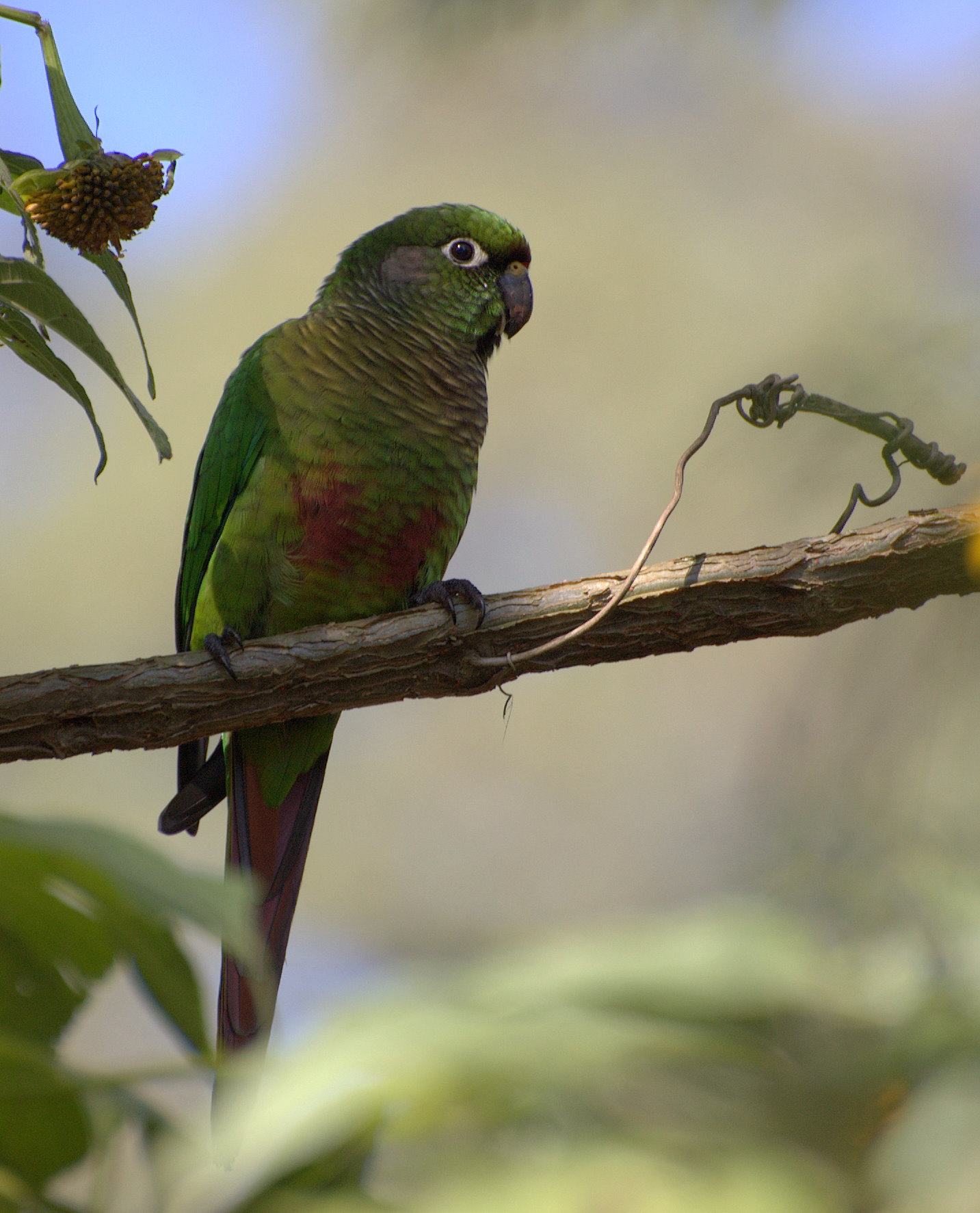
Maroon-bellied parakeet

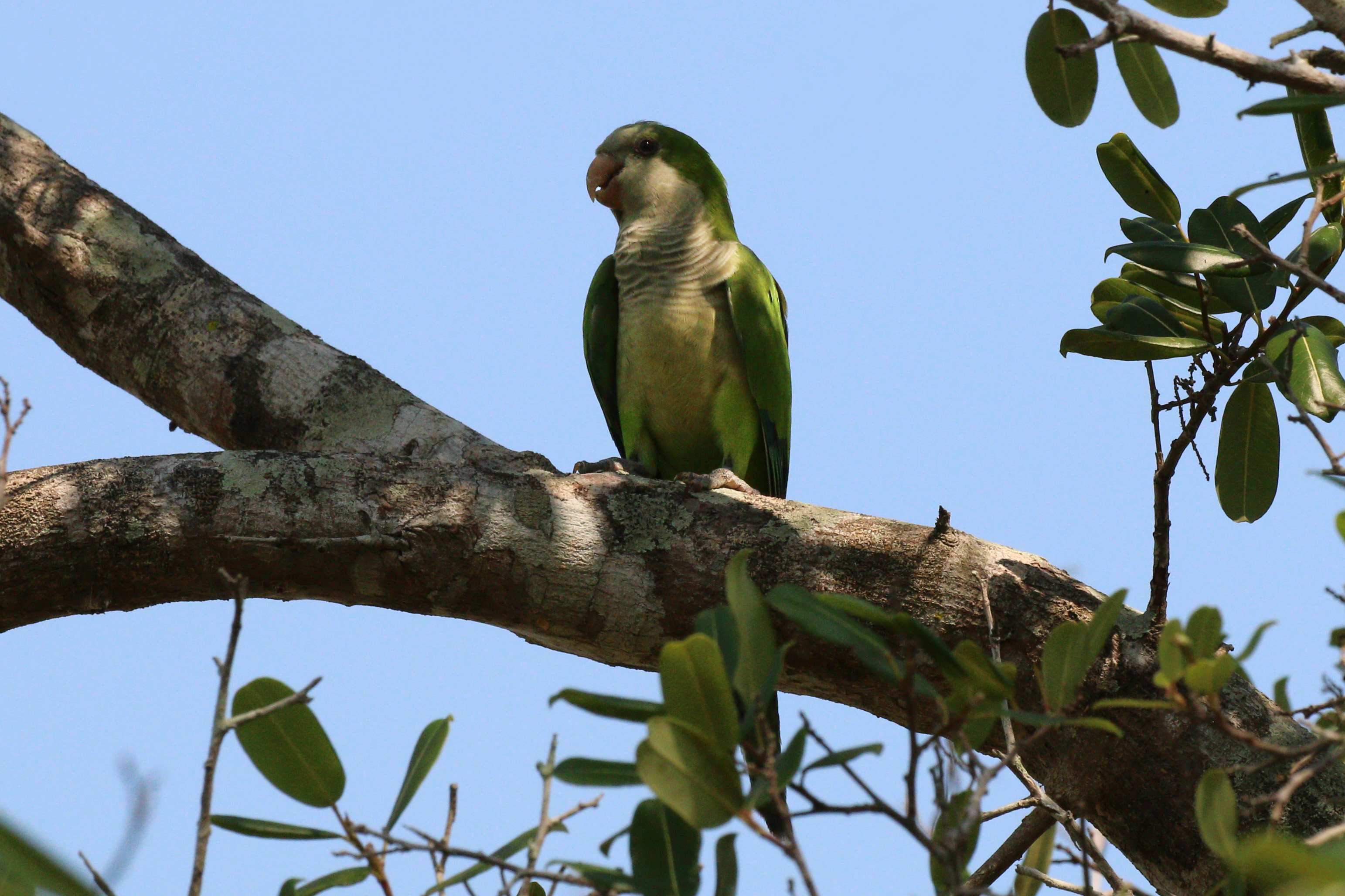
Monk parakeet

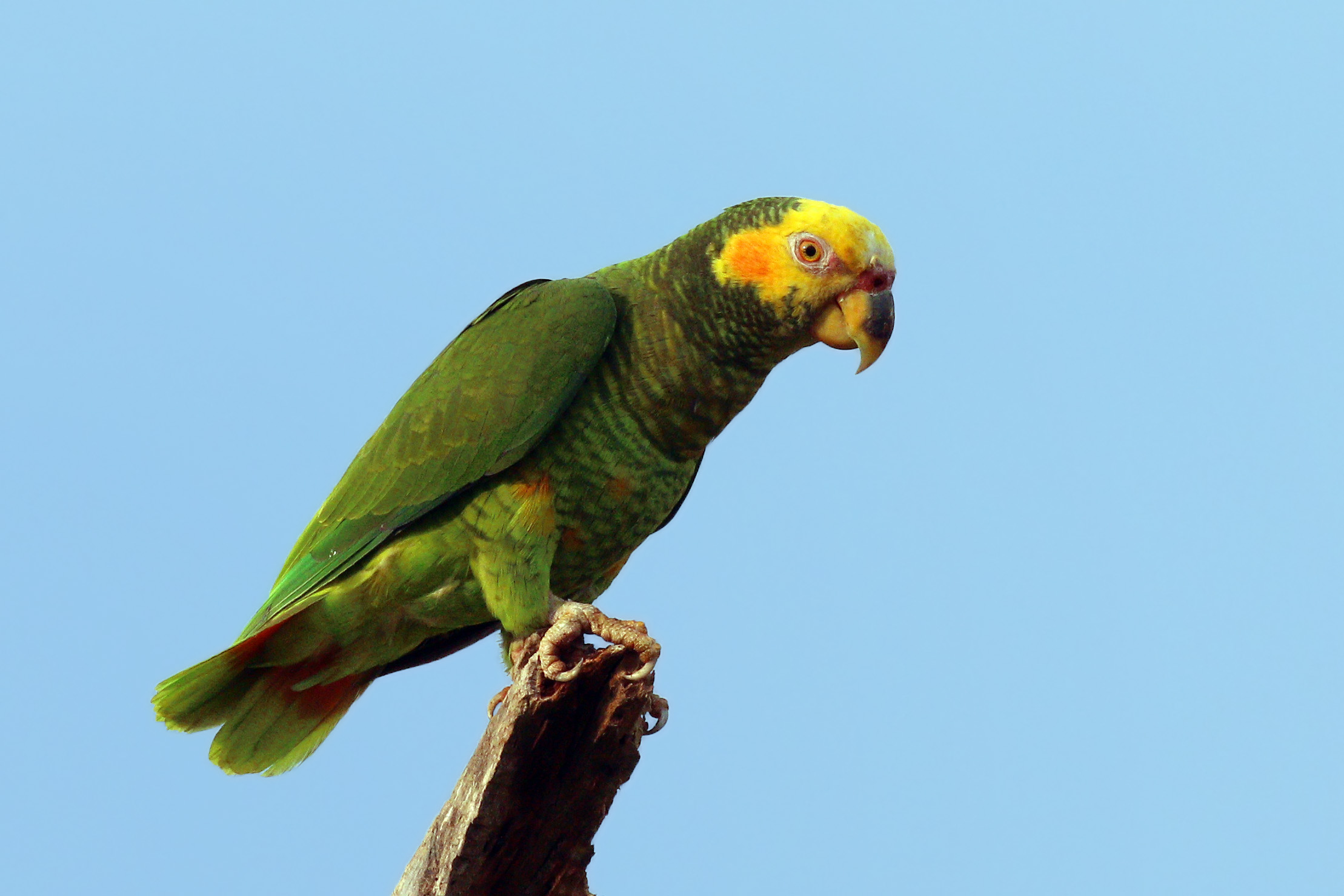
Yellow-faced parrot

== Antbirds ==
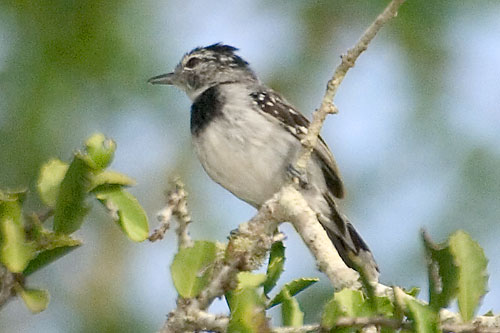
Pectoral antwren

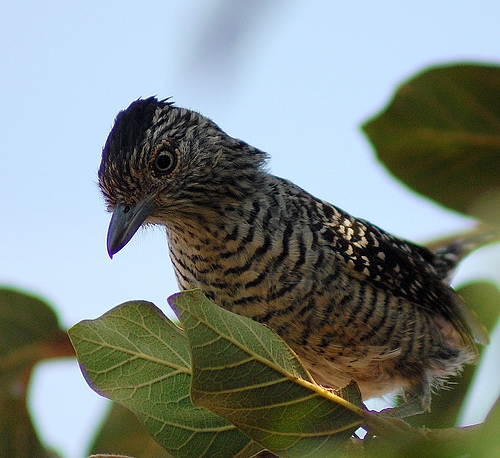
Barred antshrike

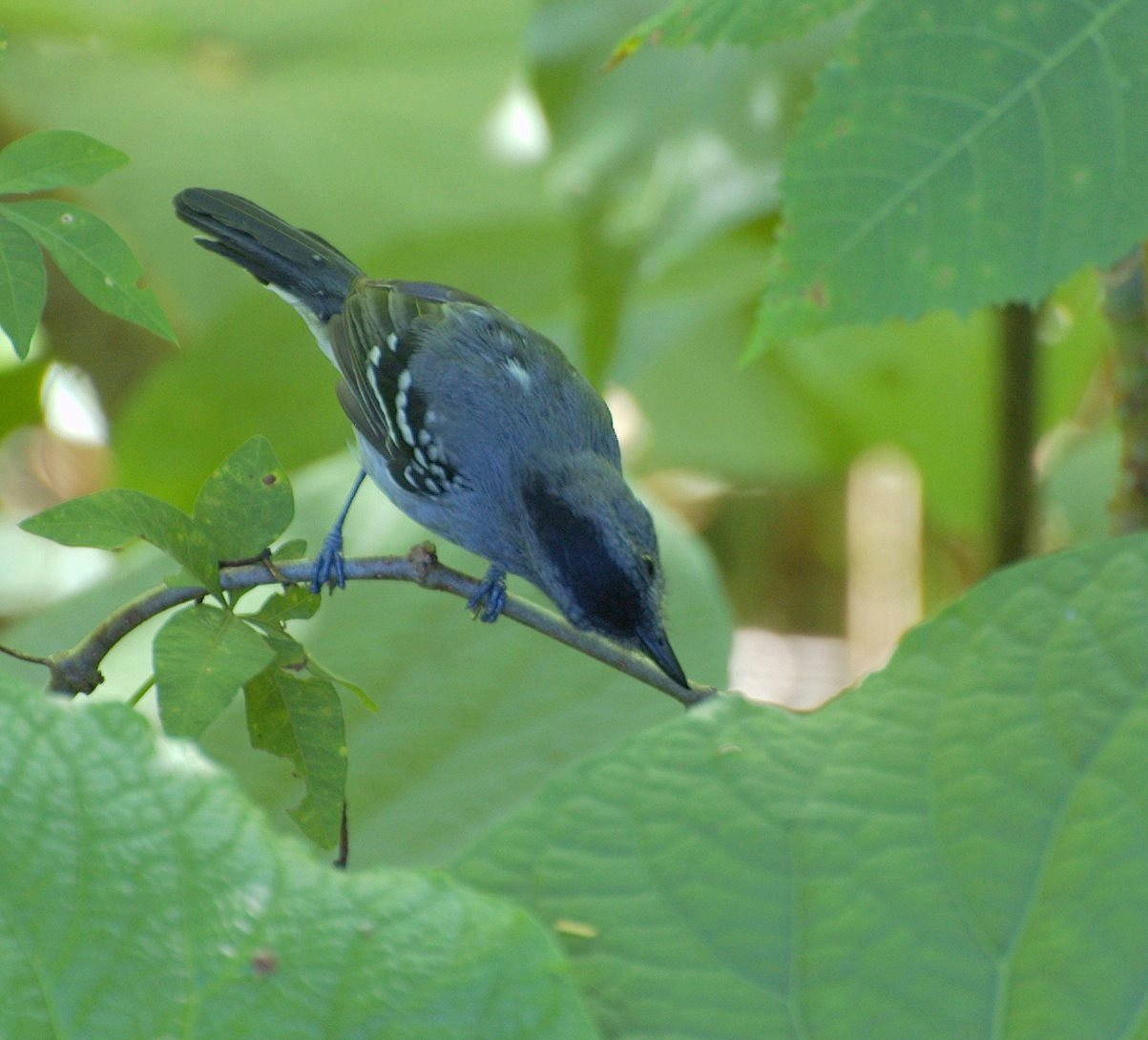
Variable antshrike

Order: Passeriformes Family: Thamnophilidae

The antbirds are a large family of small passerine birds of subtropical and tropical Central and South America. They are forest birds which tend to feed on insects at or near the ground. A sizable minority of them specialize in following columns of army ants to eat small invertebrates that leave their hiding places to flee from the ants. Many species lack bright color, with brown, black, and white being the dominant tones.

- Chestnut-shouldered antwren, Euchrepomis humeralis
- Ash-winged antwren, Euchrepomis spodioptila
- Fasciated antshrike, Cymbilaimus lineatus
- Bamboo antshrike, Cymbilaimus sanctaemariae
- Spot-backed antshrike, Hypoedaleus guttatus
- Giant antshrike, Batara cinerea
- Large-tailed antshrike, Mackenziaena leachii
- Tufted antshrike, Mackenziaena severa
- Black-throated antshrike, Frederickena viridis
- Undulated antshrike, Frederickena unduliger
- Great antshrike, Taraba major
- Black-crested antshrike, Sakesphorus canadensis
- Glossy antshrike, Sakesphorus luctuosus (E)
- Caatinga antwren, Radinopsyche sellowi (E)
- White-bearded antshrike, Biatas nigropectus (vulnerable)
- Barred antshrike, Thamnophilus doliatus
- Rufous-capped antshrike, Thamnophilus ruficapillus
- Rufous-winged antshrike, Thamnophilus torquatus
- Chestnut-backed antshrike, Thamnophilus palliatus
- Plain-winged antshrike, Thamnophilus schistaceus
- Mouse-colored antshrike, Thamnophilus murinus
- Castelnau's antshrike, Thamnophilus cryptoleucus
- Blackish-gray antshrike, Thamnophilus nigrocinereus
- Northern slaty-antshrike, Thamnophilus punctatus
- Natterer's slaty-antshrike, Thamnophilus stictocephalus
- Bolivian slaty-antshrike, Thamnophilus sticturus
- Planalto slaty-antshrike, Thamnophilus pelzelni (E)
- Sooretama slaty-antshrike, Thamnophilus ambiguus (E)
- Variable antshrike, Thamnophilus caerulescens
- White-shouldered antshrike, Thamnophilus aethiops
- Band-tailed antshrike, Thamnophilus melanothorax
- Amazonian antshrike, Thamnophilus amazonicus
- Streak-backed antshrike, Thamnophilus insignis
- Acre antshrike, Thamnophilus divisorius
- Star-throated antwren, Rhopias gularis (E)
- Pearly antshrike, Megastictus margaritatus
- Black bushbird, Neoctantes niger
- Rondonia bushbird, Clytoctantes atrogularis (E) (vulnerable)
- Silvery-cheeked antshrike, Sakesphoroides cristatus (E)
- Spot-breasted antvireo, Dysithamnus stictothorax (E) (near-threatened)
- Plain antvireo, Dysithamnus mentalis
- Rufous-backed antvireo, Dysithamnus xanthopterus (E)
- Plumbeous antvireo, Dysithamnus plumbeus (E) (vulnerable)
- Predicted antwren, Herpsilochmus praedictus (E)
- Aripuana antwren, Herpsilochmus stotzi (E)
- Black-capped antwren, Herpsilochmus atricapillus
- Bahia antwren, Herpsilochmus pileatus (E) (vulnerable)
- Spot-tailed antwren, Herpsilochmus sticturus
- Todd's antwren, Herpsilochmus stictocephalus
- Spot-backed antwren, Herpsilochmus dorsimaculatus
- Roraiman antwren, Herpsilochmus roraimae
- Pectoral antwren, Herpsilochmus pectoralis (E) (vulnerable)
- Large-billed antwren, Herpsilochmus longirostris
- Rufous-margined antwren, Herpsilochmus frater
- Rusty-winged antwren, Herpsilochmus rufimarginatus
- Dusky-throated antshrike, Thamnomanes ardesiacus
- Saturnine antshrike, Thamnomanes saturninus
- Cinereous antshrike, Thamnomanes caesius
- Bluish-slate antshrike, Thamnomanes schistogynus
- Plain-throated antwren, Isleria hauxwelli
- Rufous-bellied antwren, Isleria guttata
- Spot-winged antshrike, Pygiptila stellaris
- Ornate stipplethroat, Epinecrophylla ornata
- Rufous-tailed stipplethroat, Epinecrophylla erythrura
- White-eyed stipplethroat, Epinecrophylla leucophthalma
- Brown-bellied stipplethroat, Epinecrophylla gutturalis
- Rufous-backed stipplethroat, Epinecrophylla haematonota
- Rio Madeira stipplethroat, Epinecrophylla amazonica
- Pygmy antwren, Myrmotherula brachyura
- Moustached antwren, Myrmotherula ignota
- Yellow-throated antwren, Myrmotherula ambigua
- Sclater's antwren, Myrmotherula sclateri
- Guianan streaked-antwren, Myrmotherula surinamensis
- Amazonian streaked-antwren, Myrmotherula multostriata
- Cherrie's antwren, Myrmotherula cherriei
- Klages's antwren, Myrmotherula klagesi (E) (vulnerable)
- White-flanked antwren, Myrmotherula axillaris
- Rio Suno antwren, Myrmotherula sunensis
- Salvadori's antwren, Myrmotherula minor (E) (vulnerable)
- Long-winged antwren, Myrmotherula longipennis
- Band-tailed antwren, Myrmotherula urosticta (E) (vulnerable)
- Ihering's antwren, Myrmotherula iheringi
- Rio de Janeiro antwren, Myrmotherula fluminensis (E) (not yet assessed by IUCN)
- Unicolored antwren, Myrmotherula unicolor (E)
- Alagoas antwren, Myrmotherula snowi (E) (critically endangered)
- Plain-winged antwren, Myrmotherula behni
- Gray antwren, Myrmotherula menetriesii
- Leaden antwren, Myrmotherula assimilis
- Banded antbird, Dichrozona cincta
- Stripe-backed antbird, Myrmorchilus strigilatus
- Dot-winged antwren, Microrhopias quixensis
- Narrow-billed antwren, Formicivora iheringi (E) (near-threatened)
- Black-hooded antwren, Formicivora erythronotos (E) (endangered)
- White-fringed antwren, Formicivora grisea
- Serra antwren, Formicivora serrana (E)
- Restinga antwren, Formicivora littoralis (E) (not yet assessed by IUCN)
- Black-bellied antwren, Formicivora melanogaster
- Rusty-backed antwren, Formicivora rufa
- Sincora antwren, Formicivora grantsaui (E) (endangered)
- Marsh antwren, Formicivora acutirostris (E) (endangered)
- Ferruginous antbird, Drymophila ferruginea (E)
- Bertoni's antbird, Drymophila rubricollis
- Rufous-tailed antbird, Drymophila genei (E)
- Ochre-rumped antbird, Drymophila ochropyga (E) (near-threatened)
- Dusky-tailed antbird, Drymophila malura
- Scaled antbird, Drymophila squamata (E)
- Striated antbird, Drymophila devillei
- Guianan warbling-antbird, Hypocnemis cantator
- Imeri warbling-antbird, Hypocnemis flavescens
- Peruvian warbling-antbird, Hypocnemis peruviana
- Yellow-breasted warbling-antbird, Hypocnemis subflava
- Manicore warbling-antbird, Hypocnemis rondoni (E)
- Rondonia warbling-antbird, Hypocnemis ochrogyna
- Spix's warbling-antbird, Hypocnemis striata (E)
- Yellow-browed antbird, Hypocnemis hypoxantha
- Orange-bellied antwren, Terenura sicki (E) (critically endangered)
- Streak-capped antwren, Terenura maculata
- Willis's antbird, Cercomacroides laeta
- Dusky antbird, Cercomacroides tyrannina
- Black antbird, Cercomacroides serva
- Blackish antbird, Cercomacroides nigrescens
- Riparian antbird, Cercomacroides fuscicauda
- Manu antbird, Cercomacra manu
- Gray antbird, Cercomacra cinerascens
- Rio de Janeiro antbird, Cercomacra brasiliana (E) (near-threatened)
- Mato Grosso antbird, Cercomacra melanaria
- Bananal antbird, Cercomacra ferdinandi (E)
- Rio Branco antbird, Cercomacra carbonaria (critically endangered)
- Western fire-eye, Pyriglena maura
- Tapajos fire-eye, Pyriglena similis (E)
- East Amazonian fire-eye, Pyriglena leuconota (E)
- Fringe-backed fire-eye, Pyriglena atra (E) (endangered)
- White-shouldered fire-eye, Pyriglena leucoptera
- Slender antbird, Rhopornis ardesiacus (E) (endangered)
- White-browed antbird, Myrmoborus leucophrys
- Ash-breasted antbird, Myrmoborus lugubris
- Black-faced antbird, Myrmoborus myotherinus
- Black-tailed antbird, Myrmoborus melanurus (vulnerable)
- White-lined antbird, Myrmoborus lophotes
- Black-chinned antbird, Hypocnemoides melanopogon
- Band-tailed antbird, Hypocnemoides maculicauda
- Black-and-white antbird, Myrmochanes hemileucus
- Silvered antbird, Sclateria naevia
- Black-headed antbird, Percnostola rufifrons
- Slate-colored antbird, Myrmelastes schistaceus
- Roraiman antbird, Myrmelastes saturatus
- Plumbeous antbird, Myrmelastes hyperythrus
- Spot-winged antbird, Myrmelastes leucostigma
- Humaita antbird, Myrmelastes humaythae
- Rufous-faced antbird, Myrmelastes rufifacies (E)
- Caura antbird, Myrmelastes caurensis
- White-bellied antbird, Myrmeciza longipes
- Chestnut-tailed antbird, Sciaphylax hemimelaena
- Ferruginous-backed antbird, Myrmoderus ferrugineus
- Scalloped antbird, Myrmoderus ruficauda (E) (endangered)
- White-bibbed antbird, Myrmoderus loricatus (E)
- Squamate antbird, Myrmoderus squamosus (E)
- White-shouldered antbird, Akletos melanoceps
- Goeldi's antbird, Akletos goeldii
- Sooty antbird, Hafferia fortis
- Yapacana antbird, Aprositornis disjuncta
- Black-throated antbird, Myrmophylax atrothorax
- Gray-bellied antbird, Ammonastes pelzelni
- Wing-banded antbird, Myrmornis torquata
- White-plumed antbird, Pithys albifrons
- White-cheeked antbird, Gymnopithys leucaspis
- Rufous-throated antbird, Gymnopithys rufigula
- White-throated antbird, Oneillornis salvini
- Bare-eyed antbird, Rhegmatorhina gymnops (E)
- Harlequin antbird, Rhegmatorhina berlepschi (E)
- White-breasted antbird, Rhegmatorhina hoffmannsi (E)
- Chestnut-crested antbird, Rhegmatorhina cristata
- Hairy-crested antbird, Rhegmatorhina melanosticta
- Spot-backed antbird, Hylophylax naevius
- Dot-backed antbird, Hylophylax punctulatus
- Common scale-backed antbird, Willisornis poecilinotus
- Xingu scale-backed antbird, Willisornis vidua (E)
- Black-spotted bare-eye, Phlegopsis nigromaculata
- Reddish-winged bare-eye, Phlegopsis erythroptera
- Pale-faced bare-eye, Phlegopsis borbae (E)

== Crescentchests ==
Order: Passeriformes Family: Melanopareiidae

These are smallish birds which inhabit regions of arid scrub. They have a band across the chest which gives them their name.

- Collared crescentchest, Melanopareia torquata

== Gnateaters ==
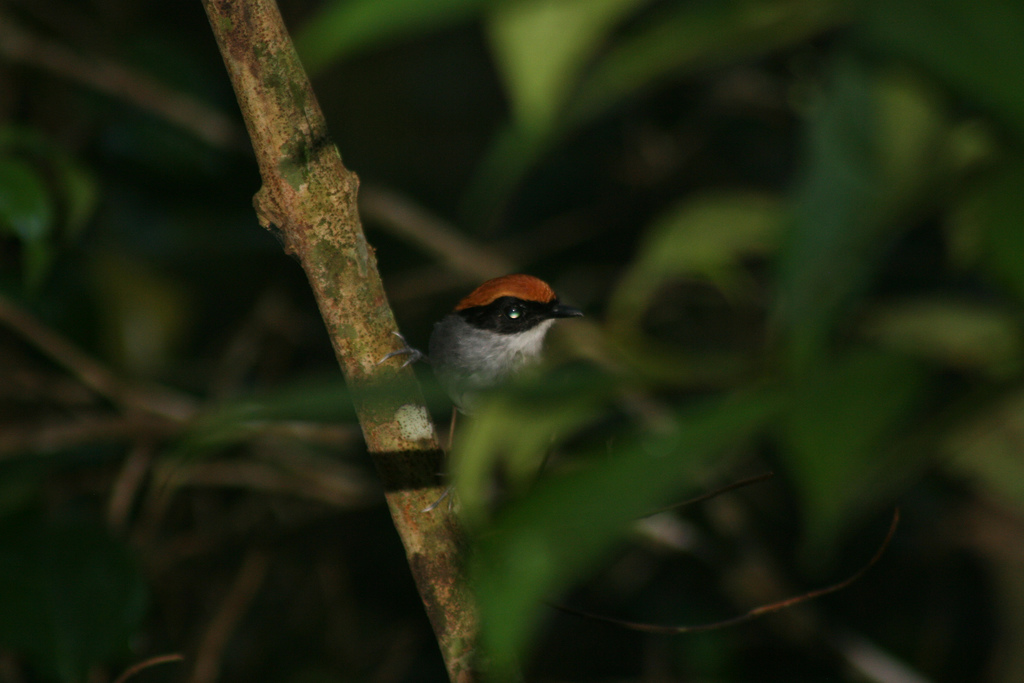
Black-cheeked gnateater

Order: Passeriformes Family: Conopophagidae

The gnateaters are round, short-tailed and long-legged birds, which are closely related to the antbirds.

- Black-bellied gnateater, Conopophaga melanogaster (E)
- Black-cheeked gnateater, Conopophaga melanops (E)
- Chestnut-belted gnateater, Conopophaga aurita
- Ash-throated gnateater, Conopophaga peruviana
- Ceara gnateater, Conopophaga cearae (E)
- Hooded gnateater, Conopophaga roberti (E)
- Rufous gnateater, Conopophaga lineata

== Antpittas ==
Order: Passeriformes Family: Grallariidae

Antpittas resemble the true pittas with strong, longish legs, very short tails and stout bills.

- Variegated antpitta, Grallaria varia
- Scaled antpitta, Grallaria guatimalensis
- Elusive antpitta, Grallaria eludens
- Speckle-breasted antpitta, Cryptopezus nattereri
- Slate-crowned antpitta, Grallaricula nana
- White-browed antpitta, Hylopezus ochroleucus (E) (near-threatened)
- Spotted antpitta, Hylopezus macularius
- Alta Floresta antpitta, Hylopezus whittakeri (E)
- Snethlage's antpitta, Hylopezus paraensis (E)
- Amazonian antpitta, Myrmothera berlepschi
- Thrush-like antpitta, Myrmothera campanisona
- Tepui antpitta, Myrmothera simplex
- Tapajos antpitta, Myrmothera subcanescens (E)

== Tapaculos ==
Order: Passeriformes Family: Rhinocryptidae

The tapaculos are small suboscine passeriform birds with numerous species in South and Central America. They are terrestrial species that fly only poorly on their short wings. They have strong legs, well-suited to their habitat of grassland or forest undergrowth. The tail is cocked and pointed towards the head.

- Spotted bamboowren, Psilorhamphus guttatus (near-threatened)
- Rusty-belted tapaculo, Liosceles thoracicus
- Slaty bristlefront, Merulaxis ater (E) (near-threatened)
- Stresemann's bristlefront, Merulaxis stresemanni (E) (critically endangered)
- Bahia tapaculo, Eleoscytalopus psychopompus (E) (endangered)
- White-breasted tapaculo, Eleoscytalopus indigoticus (E) (near-threatened)
- Marsh tapaculo, Scytalopus iraiensis (E) (endangered)
- Diamantina tapaculo, Scytalopus diamantinensis (E)
- Brasilia tapaculo, Scytalopus novacapitalis (E) (near-threatened)
- Rock tapaculo, Scytalopus petrophilus (E)
- Planalto tapaculo, Scytalopus pachecoi
- Boa Nova tapaculo, Scytalopus gonzagai (E)
- Mouse-colored tapaculo, Scytalopus speluncae (E)

== Antthrushes ==
Order: Passeriformes Family: Formicariidae

Antthrushes resemble small rails.

- Rufous-capped antthrush, Formicarius colma
- Black-faced antthrush, Formicarius analis
- Rufous-fronted antthrush, Formicarius rufifrons
- Short-tailed antthrush, Chamaeza campanisona
- Striated antthrush, Chamaeza nobilis
- Such's antthrush, Chamaeza meruloides (E)
- Rufous-tailed antthrush, Chamaeza ruficauda

== Ovenbirds ==
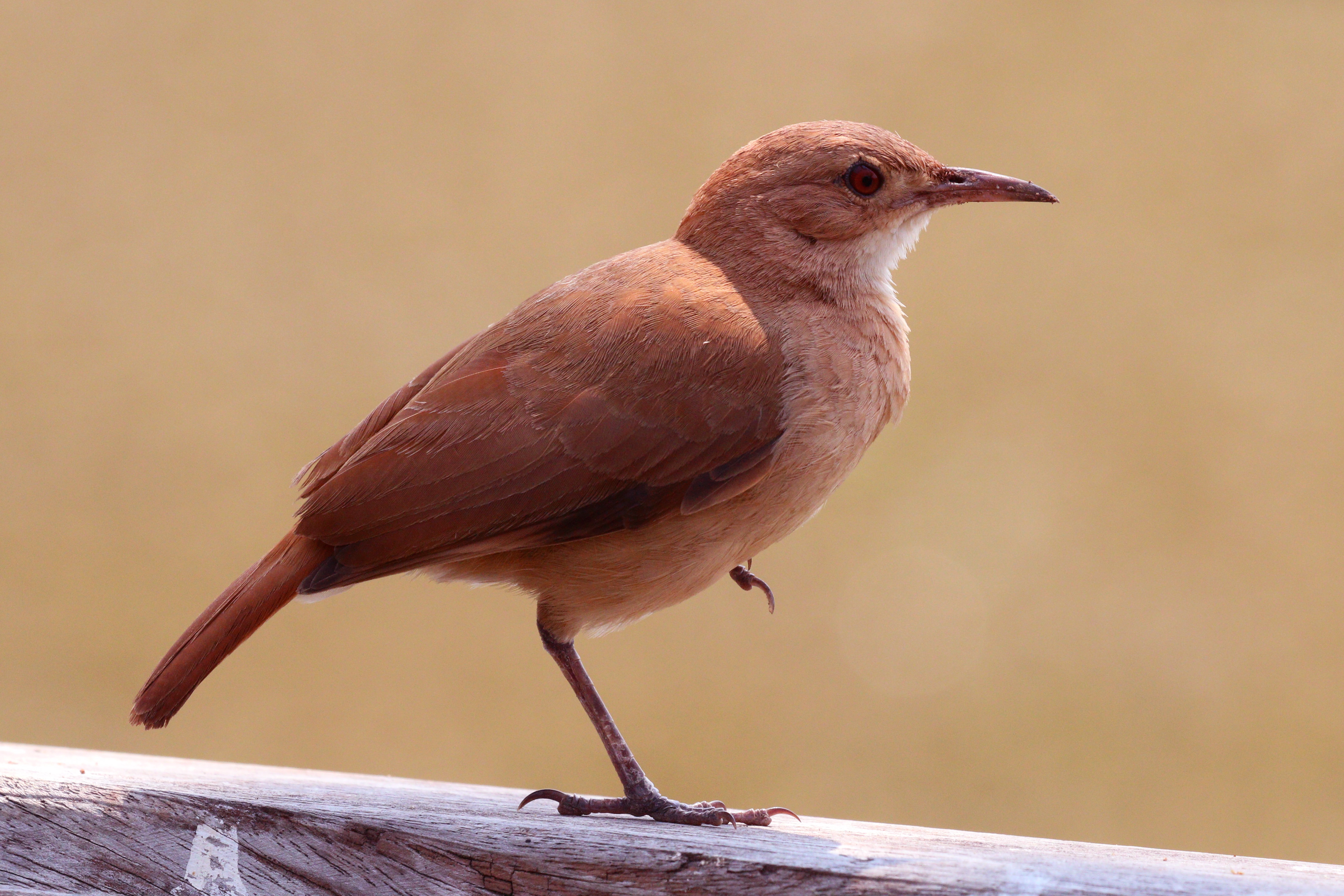
Rufous hornero

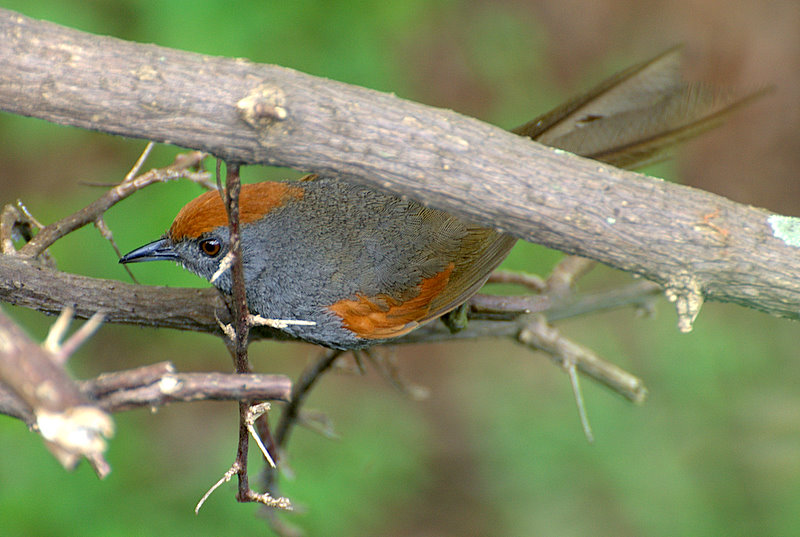
Spix's spinetail

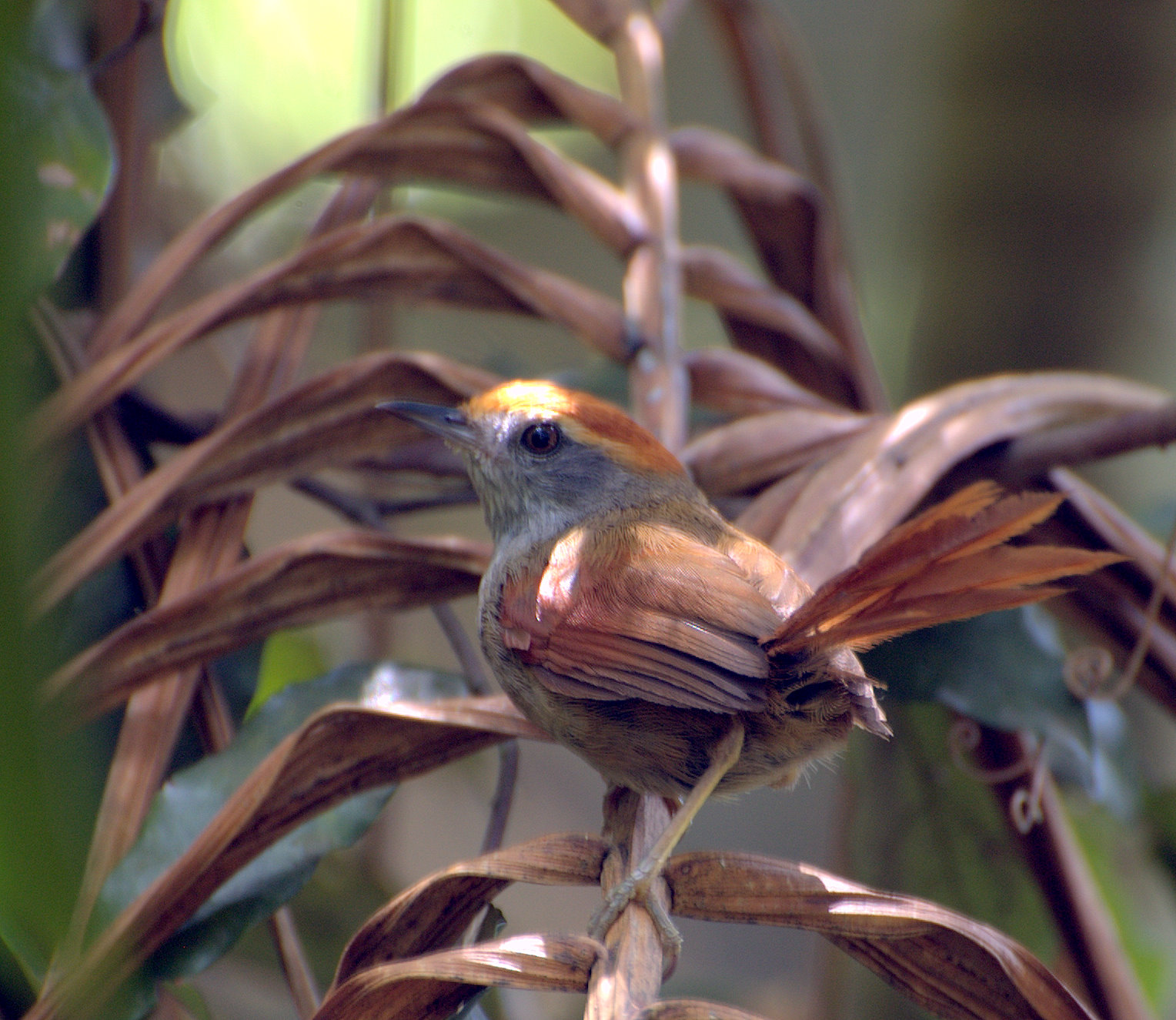
Rufous-capped spinetail

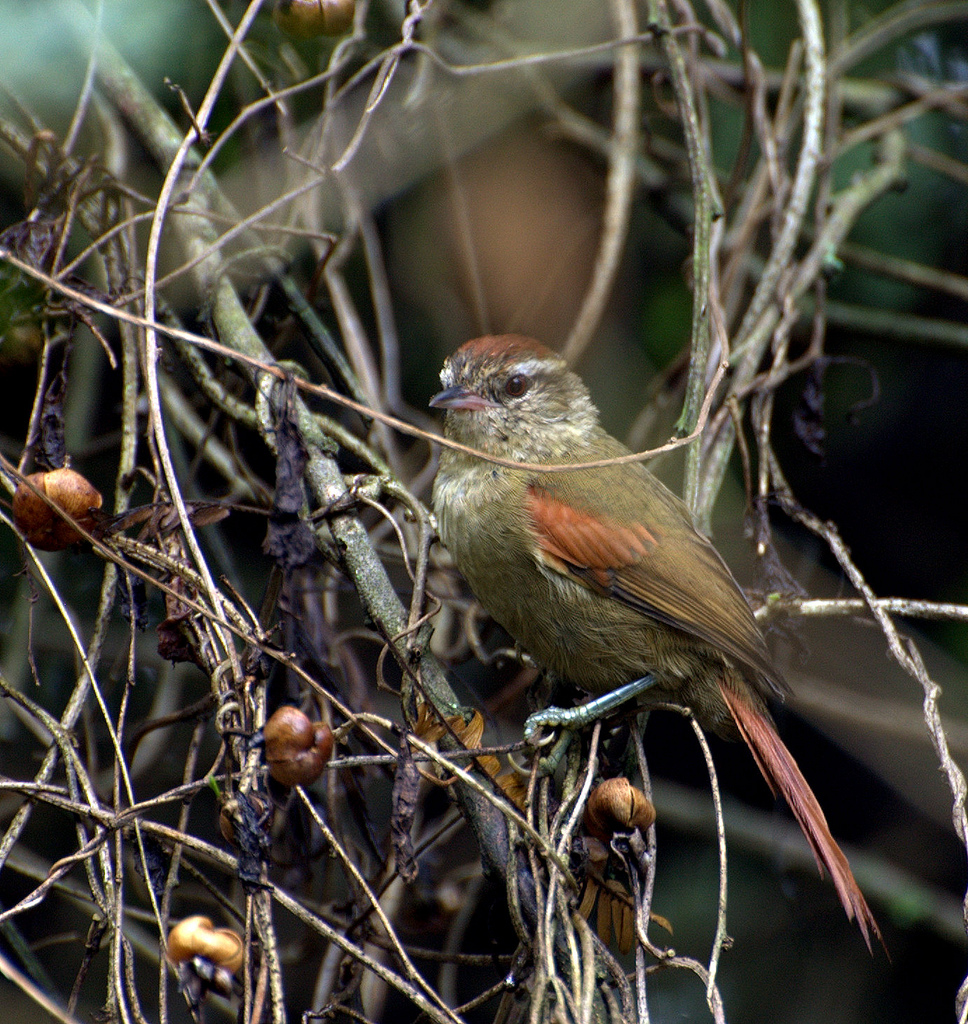
Pallid spinetail

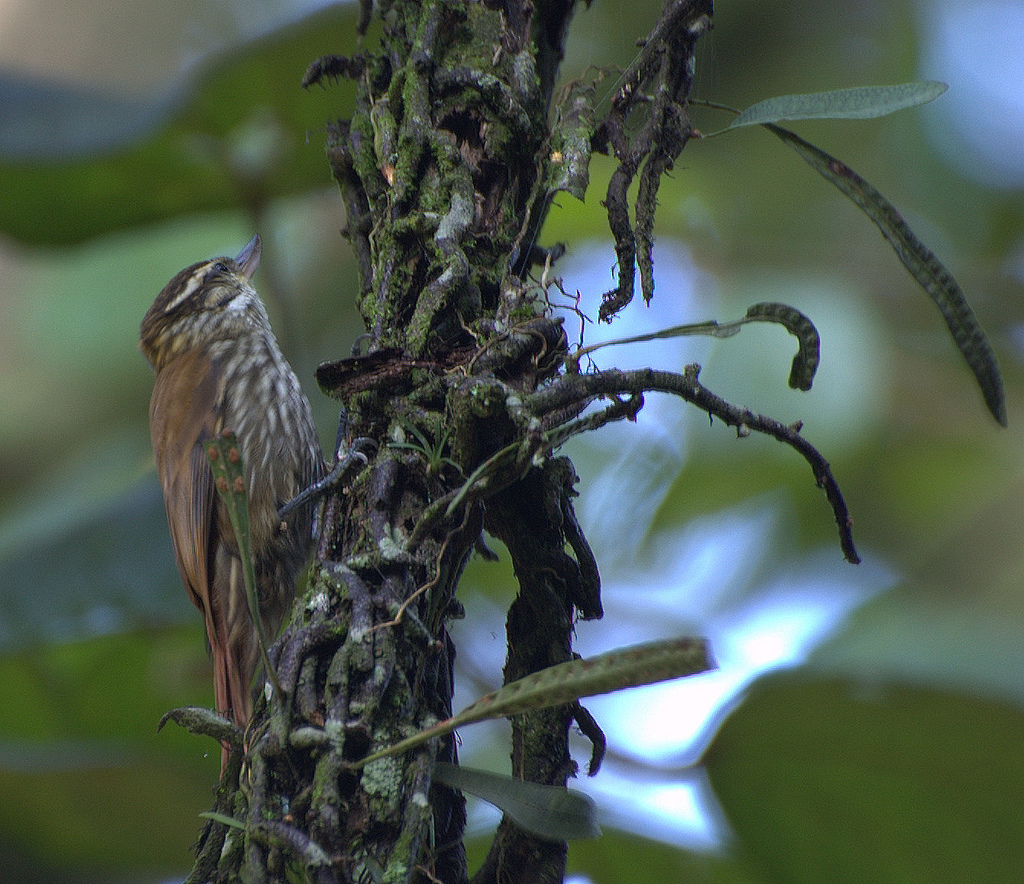
Streaked xenops

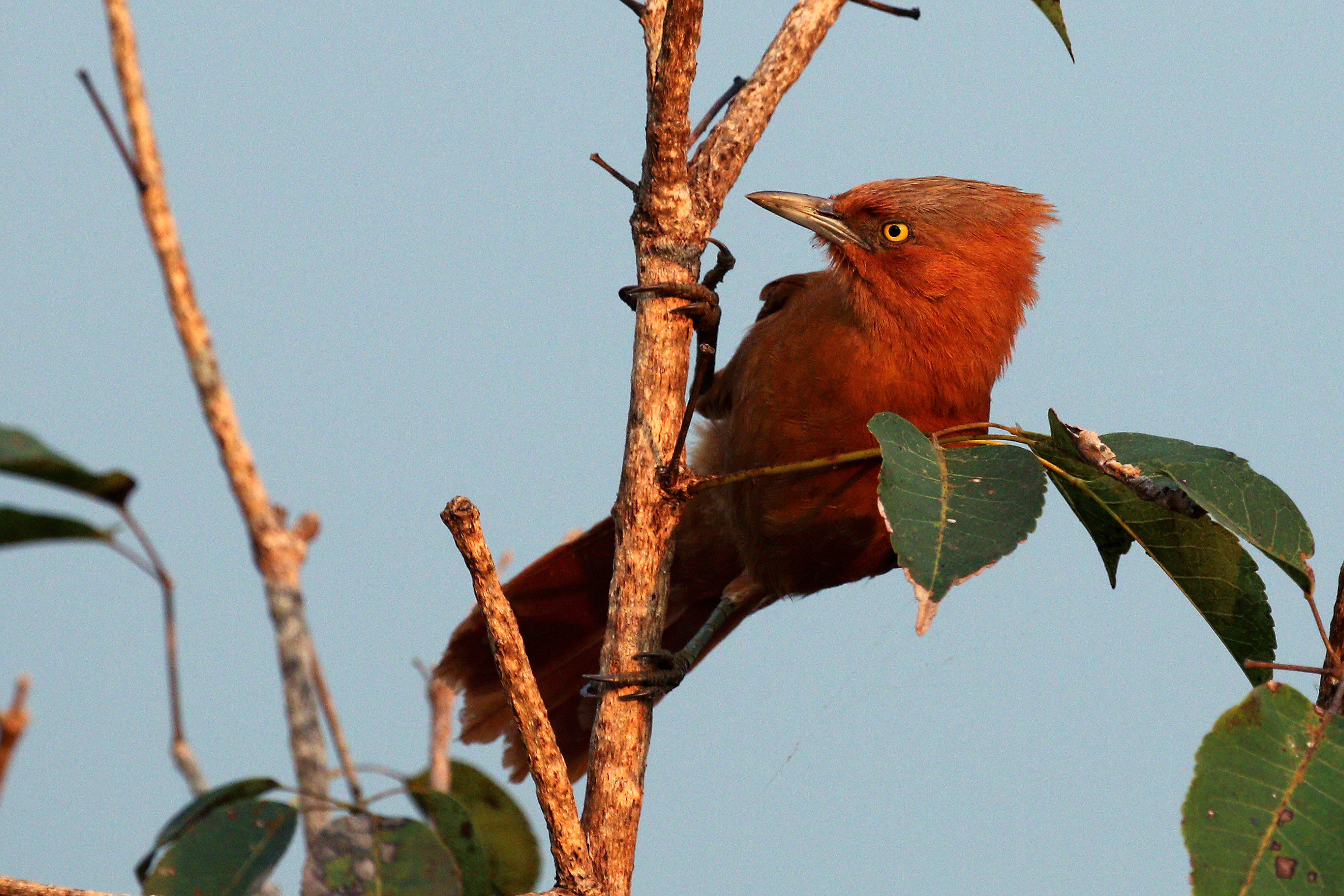
Rufous cacholote

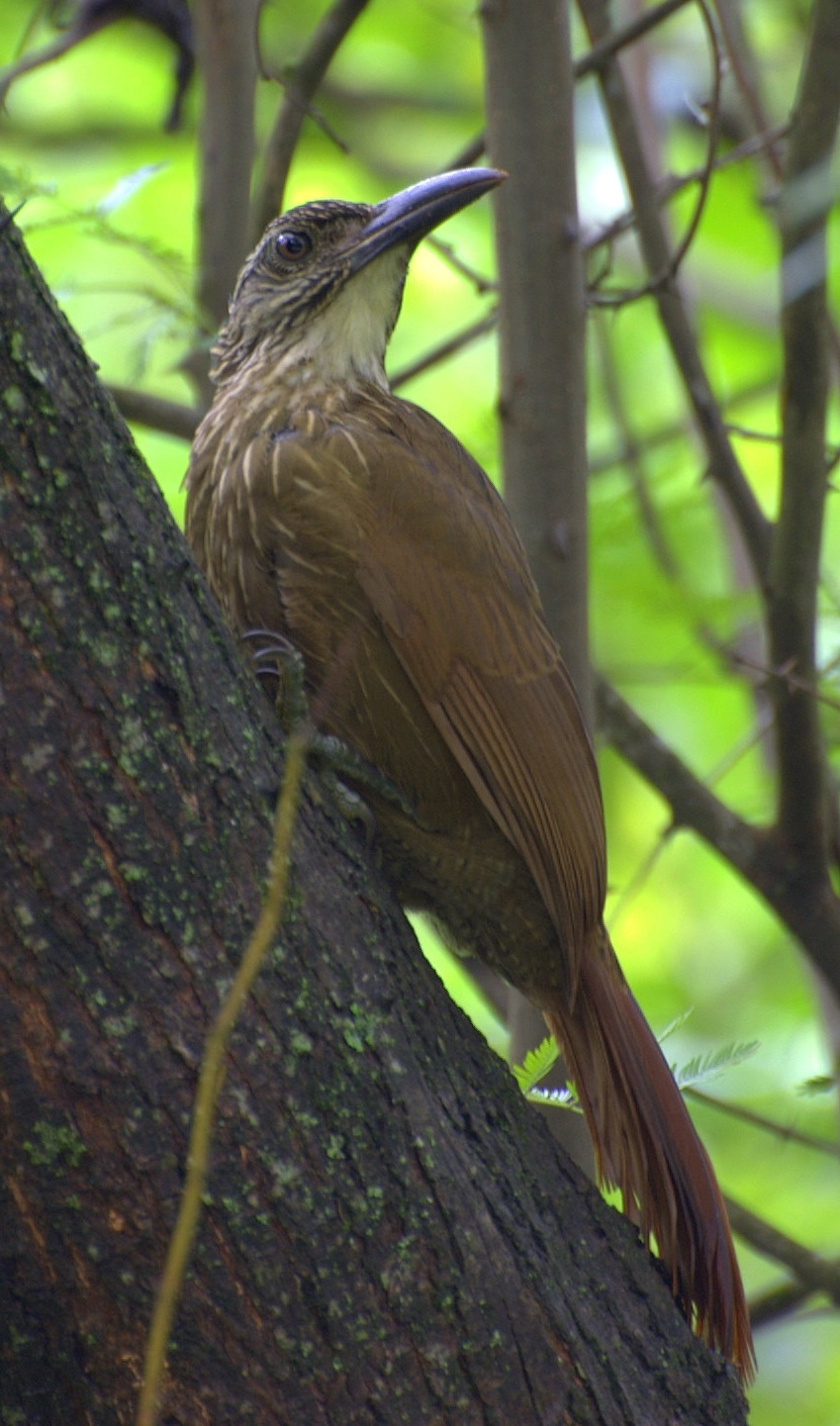
White-throated woodcreeper

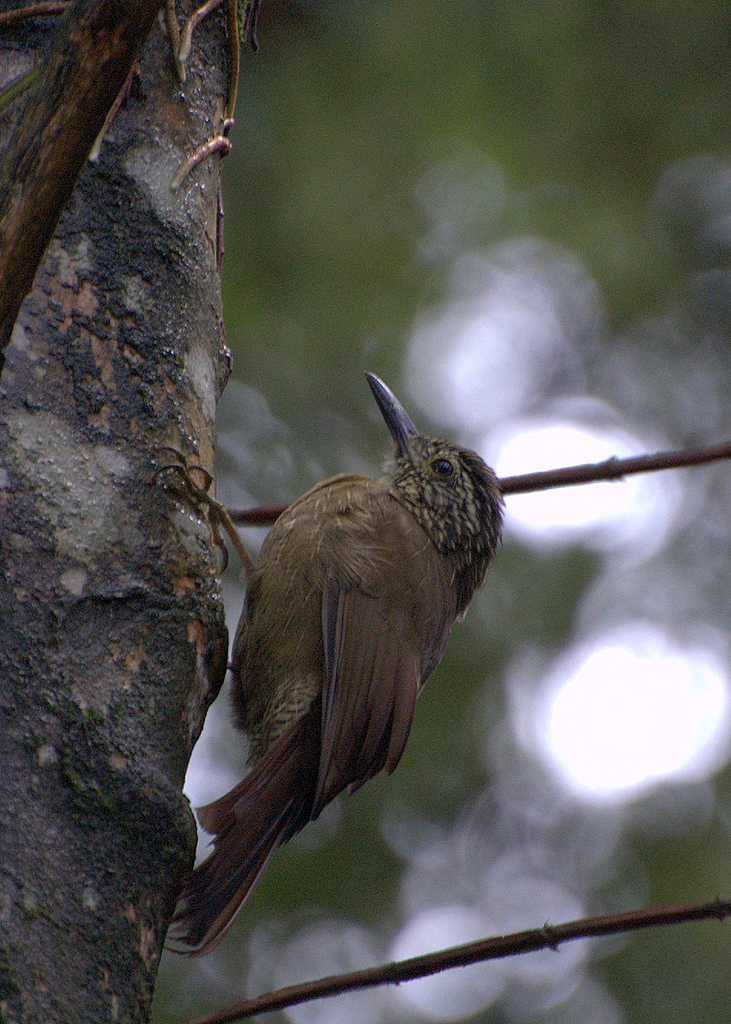
Planalto woodcreeper

Order: Passeriformes Family: Furnariidae

Ovenbirds comprise a large family of small sub-oscine passerine bird species found in Central and South America. They are a diverse group of insectivores which gets its name from the elaborate "oven-like" clay nests built by some species, although others build stick nests or nest in tunnels or clefts in rock. The woodcreepers are brownish birds which maintain an upright vertical posture, supported by their stiff tail vanes. They feed mainly on insects taken from tree trunks.

- South American leaftosser, Sclerurus obscurior
- Short-billed leaftosser, Sclerurus rufigularis
- Black-tailed leaftosser, Sclerurus caudacutus
- Gray-throated leaftosser, Sclerurus albigularis
- Rufous-breasted leaftosser, Sclerurus scansor
- Common miner, Geositta cunicularia
- Campo miner, Geositta poeciloptera (near-threatened)
- Spot-throated woodcreeper, Certhiasomus stictolaemus
- Olivaceous woodcreeper, Sittasomus griseicapillus
- Whistling long-tailed woodcreeper, Deconychura longicauda
- Mournful long-tailed woodcreeper, Deconychura pallida
- White-chinned woodcreeper, Dendrocincla merula
- Plain-brown woodcreeper, Dendrocincla fuliginosa
- Plain-winged woodcreeper, Dendrocincla turdina
- Wedge-billed woodcreeper, Glyphorynchus spirurus
- Cinnamon-throated woodcreeper, Dendrexetastes rufigula
- Long-billed woodcreeper, Nasica longirostris
- Amazonian barred-woodcreeper, Dendrocolaptes certhia
- Black-banded woodcreeper, Dendrocolaptes picumnus
- Hoffmanns's woodcreeper, Dendrocolaptes hoffmannsi (E)
- Planalto woodcreeper, Dendrocolaptes platyrostris
- Bar-bellied woodcreeper, Hylexetastes stresemanni
- Red-billed woodcreeper, Hylexetastes perrotii
- Uniform woodcreeper, Hylexetastes uniformis
- Strong-billed woodcreeper, Xiphocolaptes promeropirhynchus
- Moustached woodcreeper, Xiphocolaptes falcirostris (E) (vulnerable)
- White-throated woodcreeper, Xiphocolaptes albicollis
- Great rufous woodcreeper, Xiphocolaptes major
- Striped woodcreeper, Xiphorhynchus obsoletus
- Ceara woodcreeper, Xiphorhynchus atlanticus (E)
- Lesser woodcreeper, Xiphorhynchus fuscus
- Chestnut-rumped woodcreeper, Xiphorhynchus pardalotus
- Ocellated woodcreeper, Xiphorhynchus ocellatus
- Elegant woodcreeper, Xiphorhynchus elegans
- Spix's woodcreeper, Xiphorhynchus spixii (E)
- Buff-throated woodcreeper, Xiphorhynchus guttatus
- Straight-billed woodcreeper, Dendroplex picus
- Zimmer's woodcreeper, Dendroplex kienerii
- Red-billed scythebill, Campylorhamphus trochilirostris
- Black-billed scythebill, Campylorhamphus falcularius
- Curve-billed scythebill, Campylorhamphus procurvoides
- Scimitar-billed woodcreeper, Drymornis bridgesii
- Streak-headed woodcreeper, Lepidocolaptes souleyetii
- Narrow-billed woodcreeper, Lepidocolaptes angustirostris
- Scaled woodcreeper, Lepidocolaptes squamatus (E)
- Scalloped woodcreeper, Lepidocolaptes falcinellus
- Duida woodcreeper, Lepidocolaptes duidae
- Guianan woodcreeper, Lepidocolaptes albolineatus
- Inambari woodcreeper, Lepidocolaptes fatimalimae
- Dusky-capped woodcreeper, Lepidocolaptes fuscicapillus
- Slender-billed xenops, Xenops tenuirostris
- Amazonian plain-xenops, Xenops genibarbis
- Atlantic plain-xenops, Xenops minutus
- Streaked xenops, Xenops rutilans
- Point-tailed palmcreeper, Berlepschia rikeri
- Rufous-tailed xenops, Microxenops milleri
- Chaco earthcreeper, Tarphonomus certhioides (V)
- Wing-banded hornero, Furnarius figulus (E)
- Pale-legged hornero, Furnarius leucopus
- Pale-billed hornero, Furnarius torridus
- Lesser hornero, Furnarius minor
- Rufous hornero, Furnarius rufus
- Sharp-tailed streamcreeper, Lochmias nematura
- Wren-like rushbird, Phleocryptes melanops
- Curve-billed reedhaunter, Limnornis curvirostris
- Long-tailed cinclodes, Cinclodes pabsti (E)
- Buff-winged cinclodes, Cinclodes fuscus
- Dusky-cheeked foliage-gleaner, Anabazenops dorsalis
- White-collared foliage-gleaner, Anabazenops fuscus (E)
- Rufous-rumped foliage-gleaner, Neohilydor erythrocercum
- Great xenops, Megaxenops parnaguae (E)
- Pale-browed treehunter, Cichlocolaptes leucophrus (E)
- Cryptic treehunter, Cichlocolaptes mazarbarnetti (E) (critically endangered) (First described in 2014. Not evaluated by the SACC; a proposal is pending. Not included in counts.)
- Sharp-billed treehunter, Heliobletus contaminatus
- Alagoas foliage-gleaner, Philydor novaesi (E) (extinct)
- Black-capped foliage-gleaner, Philydor atricapillus
- Cinnamon-rumped foliage-gleaner, Philydor pyrrhodes
- Rufous-tailed foliage-gleaner, Anabacerthia ruficaudata
- White-browed foliage-gleaner, Anabacerthia amaurotis (near-threatened)
- Ochre-breasted foliage-gleaner, Anabacerthia lichtensteini
- Buff-browed foliage-gleaner, Syndactyla rufosuperciliata
- Russet-mantled foliage-gleaner, Syndactyla dimidiata
- White-throated foliage-gleaner, Syndactyla roraimae
- Peruvian recurvebill, Syndactyla ucayalae (near-threatened)
- Chestnut-winged hookbill, Ancistrops strigilatus
- Buff-fronted foliage-gleaner, Dendroma rufa
- Chestnut-winged foliage-gleaner, Dendroma erythroptera
- Chestnut-capped foliage-gleaner, Clibanornis rectirostris
- Canebrake groundcreeper, Clibanornis dendrocolaptoides (near-threatened)
- Ruddy foliage-gleaner, Clibanornis rubiginosus
- Chestnut-crowned foliage-gleaner, Automolus rufipileatus
- Brown-rumped foliage-gleaner, Automolus melanopezus
- Buff-throated foliage-gleaner, Automolus ochrolaemus
- Striped woodhaunter, Automolus subulatus
- Olive-backed foliage-gleaner, Automolus infuscatus
- Para foliage-gleaner, Automolus paraensis (E)
- Pernambuco foliage-gleaner, Automolus lammi (E)
- White-eyed foliage-gleaner, Automolus leucophthalmus
- Tufted tit-spinetail, Leptasthenura platensis
- Striolated tit-spinetail, Leptasthenura striolata (E)
- Araucaria tit-spinetail, Leptasthenura setaria (near-threatened)
- Rufous-fronted thornbird, Phacellodomus rufifrons
- Little thornbird, Phacellodomus sibilatrix
- Freckle-breasted thornbird, Phacellodomus striaticollis
- Greater thornbird, Phacellodomus ruber
- Orange-eyed thornbird, Phacellodomus erythrophthalmus (E)
- Orange-breasted thornbird, Phacellodomus ferrugineigula
- Firewood-gatherer, Anumbius annumbi
- Lark-like brushrunner, Coryphistera alaudina
- Short-billed canastero, Asthenes baeri
- Cipo canastero, Asthenes luizae (E)
- Hudson's canastero, Asthenes hudsoni
- Itatiaia spinetail, Asthenes moreirae (E)
- Sharp-billed canastero, Asthenes pyrrholeuca (V)
- Pink-legged graveteiro, Acrobatornis fonsecai (E) (vulnerable)
- Orange-fronted plushcrown, Metopothrix aurantiaca
- Roraiman barbtail, Roraimia adusta
- Striated softtail, Thripophaga macroura (E) (vulnerable)
- Plain softtail, Thripophaga fusciceps
- Straight-billed reedhaunter, Limnoctites rectirostris (near-threatened)
- Sulphur-bearded reedhaunter, Limnoctites sulphuriferus
- Rusty-backed spinetail, Cranioleuca vulpina
- Parker's spinetail, Cranioleuca vulpecula
- Stripe-crowned spinetail, Cranioleuca pyrrhophia
- Olive spinetail, Cranioleuca obsoleta
- Pallid spinetail, Cranioleuca pallida (E)
- Gray-headed spinetail, Cranioleuca semicinerea (E)
- Tepui spinetail, Cranioleuca demissa
- Speckled spinetail, Cranioleuca gutturata
- Scaled spinetail, Cranioleuca muelleri (E)
- Bay-capped wren-spinetail, Spartonoica maluroides (near-threatened)
- Caatinga cacholote, Pseudoseisura cristata (E)
- Rufous cacholote, Pseudoseisura unirufa
- Brown cacholote, Pseudoseisura lophotes
- Yellow-chinned spinetail, Certhiaxis cinnamomeus
- Red-and-white spinetail, Certhiaxis mustelinus
- White-bellied spinetail, Mazaria propinqua
- Chotoy spinetail, Schoeniophylax phryganophilus
- Ochre-cheeked spinetail, Synallaxis scutata
- Gray-bellied spinetail, Synallaxis cinerascens
- Plain-crowned spinetail, Synallaxis gujanensis
- White-lored spinetail, Synallaxis albilora
- Red-shouldered spinetail, Synallaxis hellmayri (E)
- Rufous-capped spinetail, Synallaxis ruficapilla
- Bahia spinetail, Synallaxis cinerea (E) (near-threatened)
- Pinto's spinetail, Synallaxis infuscata (E) (endangered)
- McConnell's spinetail, Synallaxis macconnelli
- Cabanis's spinetail, Synallaxis cabanisi
- Cinereous-breasted spinetail, Synallaxis hypospodia
- Spix's spinetail, Synallaxis spixi
- Dark-breasted spinetail, Synallaxis albigularis
- Pale-breasted spinetail, Synallaxis albescens
- Sooty-fronted spinetail, Synallaxis frontalis
- Hoary-throated spinetail, Synallaxis kollari (critically endangered)
- Ruddy spinetail, Synallaxis rutilans
- Chestnut-throated spinetail, Synallaxis cherriei (near-threatened)

== Manakins ==
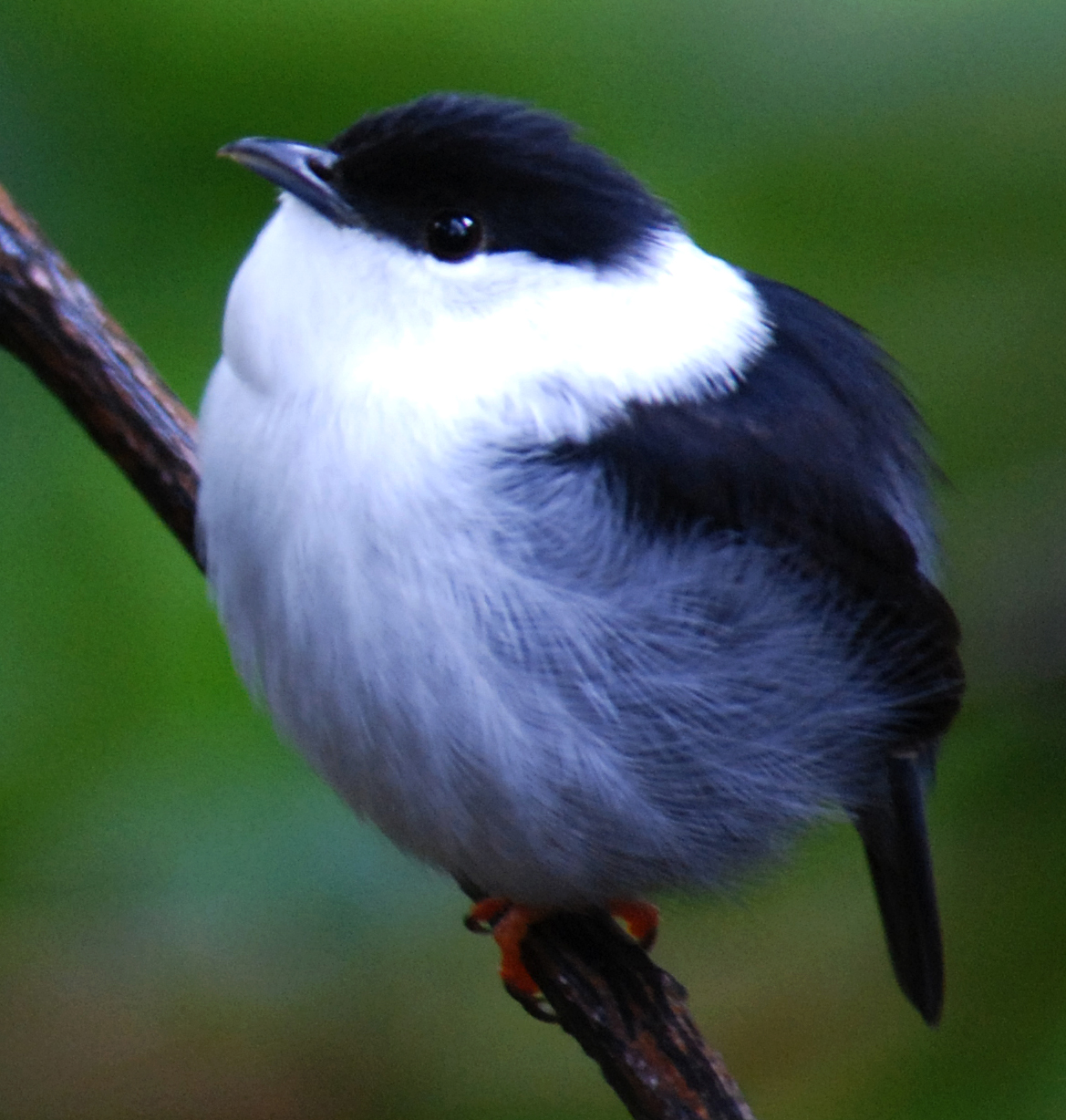
White-bearded manakin

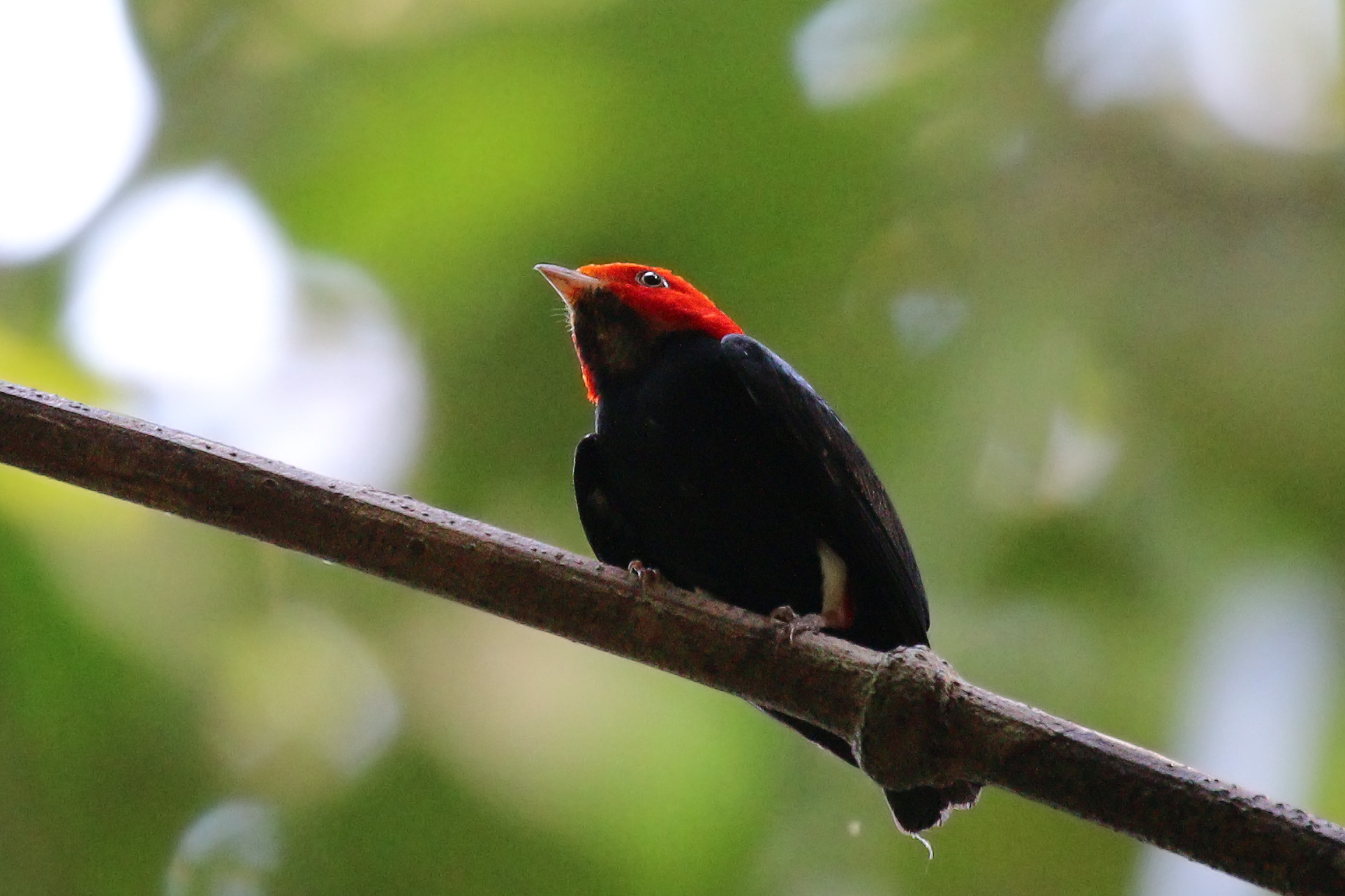
Red-headed manakin

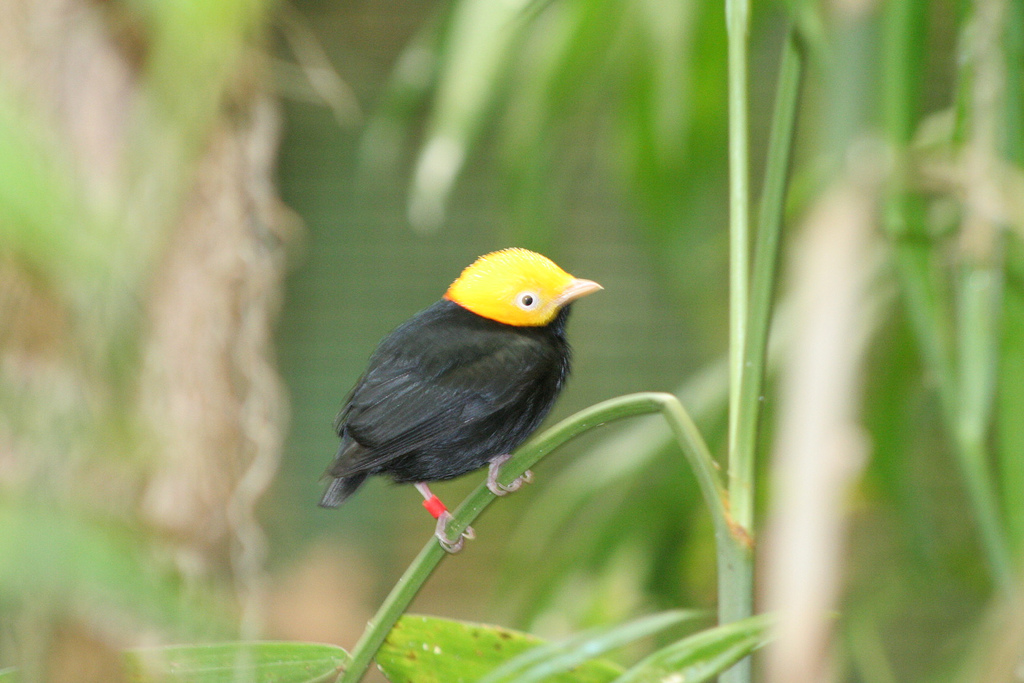
Golden-headed manakin

Order: Passeriformes Family: Pipridae

The manakins are a family of subtropical and tropical mainland Central and South America, and Trinidad and Tobago. They are compact forest birds, the males typically being brightly colored, although the females of most species are duller and usually green-plumaged. Manakins feed on small fruits, berries and insects.

- Serra do Mar tyrant-manakin, Protopelma chrysolophum (E)
- Dwarf tyrant-manakin, Tyranneutes stolzmanni
- Tiny tyrant-manakin, Tyranneutes virescens
- Pale-bellied tyrant-manakin, Neopelma pallescens
- Saffron-crested tyrant-manakin, Neopelma chrysocephalum
- Wied's tyrant-manakin, Neopelma aurifrons (E)
- Sulphur-bellied tyrant-manakin, Neopelma sulphureiventer
- Blue-backed manakin, Chiroxiphia pareola
- Swallow-tailed manakin, Chiroxiphia caudata
- Araripe manakin, Chiroxiphia bokermanni (E) (critically endangered)
- Helmeted manakin, Chiroxiphia galeata
- Pin-tailed manakin, Ilicura militaris (E)
- White-throated manakin, Corapipo gutturalis
- Olive manakin, Xenopipo uniformis
- Black manakin, Xenopipo atronitens
- Blue-capped manakin, Lepidothrix coronata
- Snow-capped manakin, Lepidothrix nattereri
- Golden-crowned manakin, Lepidothrix vilasboasi (E) (vulnerable)
- Opal-crowned manakin, Lepidothrix iris (E)
- Orange-bellied manakin, Lepidothrix suavissima
- White-fronted manakin, Lepidothrix serena
- Orange-crowned manakin, Heterocercus aurantiivertex
- Yellow-crowned manakin, Heterocercus flavivertex
- Flame-crowned manakin, Heterocercus linteatus
- White-bearded manakin, Manacus manacus
- Crimson-hooded manakin, Pipra aureola
- Wire-tailed manakin, Pipra filicauda
- Band-tailed manakin, Pipra fasciicauda
- Striolated manakin, Machaeropterus striolatus
- Kinglet manakin, Machaeropterus regulus (E)
- Fiery-capped manakin, Machaeropterus pyrocephalus
- White-crowned manakin, Pseudopipra pipra
- Scarlet-horned manakin, Ceratopipra cornuta
- Golden-headed manakin, Ceratopipra erythrocephala
- Red-headed manakin, Ceratopipra rubrocapilla
- Round-tailed manakin, Ceratopipra chloromeros

== Cotingas ==
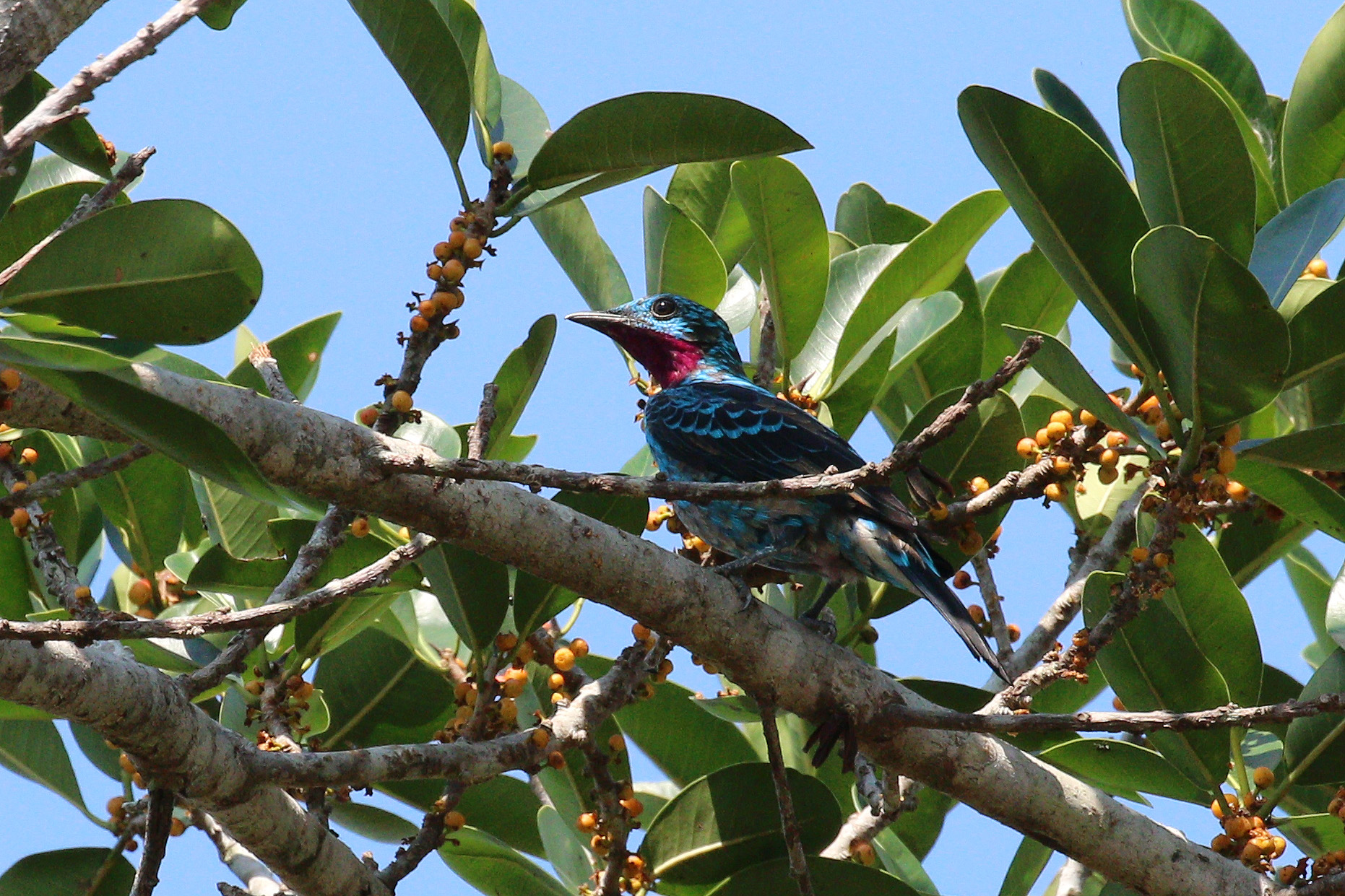
Spangled cotinga

Order: Passeriformes Family: Cotingidae

The cotingas are birds of forests or forest edges in tropical South America. Comparatively little is known about this diverse group, although all have broad bills with hooked tips, rounded wings, and strong legs. The males of many of the species are brightly colored or decorated with plumes or wattles.

- Hooded berryeater, Carpornis cucullatus (E) (near-threatened)
- Black-headed berryeater, Carpornis melanocephalus (E) (vulnerable)
- Red-banded fruiteater, Pipreola whitelyi
- White-tipped plantcutter, Phytotoma rutila (V)
- Swallow-tailed cotinga, Phibalura flavirostris (near-threatened)
- Guianan red-cotinga, Phoenicircus carnifex
- Black-necked red-cotinga, Phoenicircus nigricollis
- Guianan cock-of-the-rock, Rupicola rupicola
- Crimson fruitcrow, Haematoderus militaris
- Purple-throated fruitcrow, Querula purpurata
- Red-ruffed fruitcrow, Pyroderus scutatus
- Amazonian umbrellabird, Cephalopterus ornatus
- Capuchinbird, Perissocephalus tricolor
- Plum-throated cotinga, Cotinga maynana
- Purple-breasted cotinga, Cotinga cotinga
- Banded cotinga, Cotinga maculata (E) (endangered)
- Spangled cotinga, Cotinga cayana
- Rose-collared piha, Lipaugus streptophorus
- Screaming piha, Lipaugus vociferans
- Cinnamon-vented piha, Lipaugus lanioides (E) (near-threatened)
- Black-and-gold cotinga, Lipaugus ater (E) (near-threatened)
- Gray-winged cotinga, Lipaugus conditus (E) (vulnerable)
- White bellbird, Procnias alba
- Bearded bellbird, Procnias averano
- Bare-throated bellbird, Procnias nudicollis (vulnerable)
- Purple-throated cotinga, Porphyrolaema porphyrolaema
- Pompadour cotinga, Xipholena punicea
- White-tailed cotinga, Xipholena lamellipennis (E)
- White-winged cotinga, Xipholena atropurpurea (E) (vulnerable)
- Bare-necked fruitcrow, Gymnoderus foetidus
- Black-faced cotinga, Conioptilon mcilhennyi

== Tityras ==
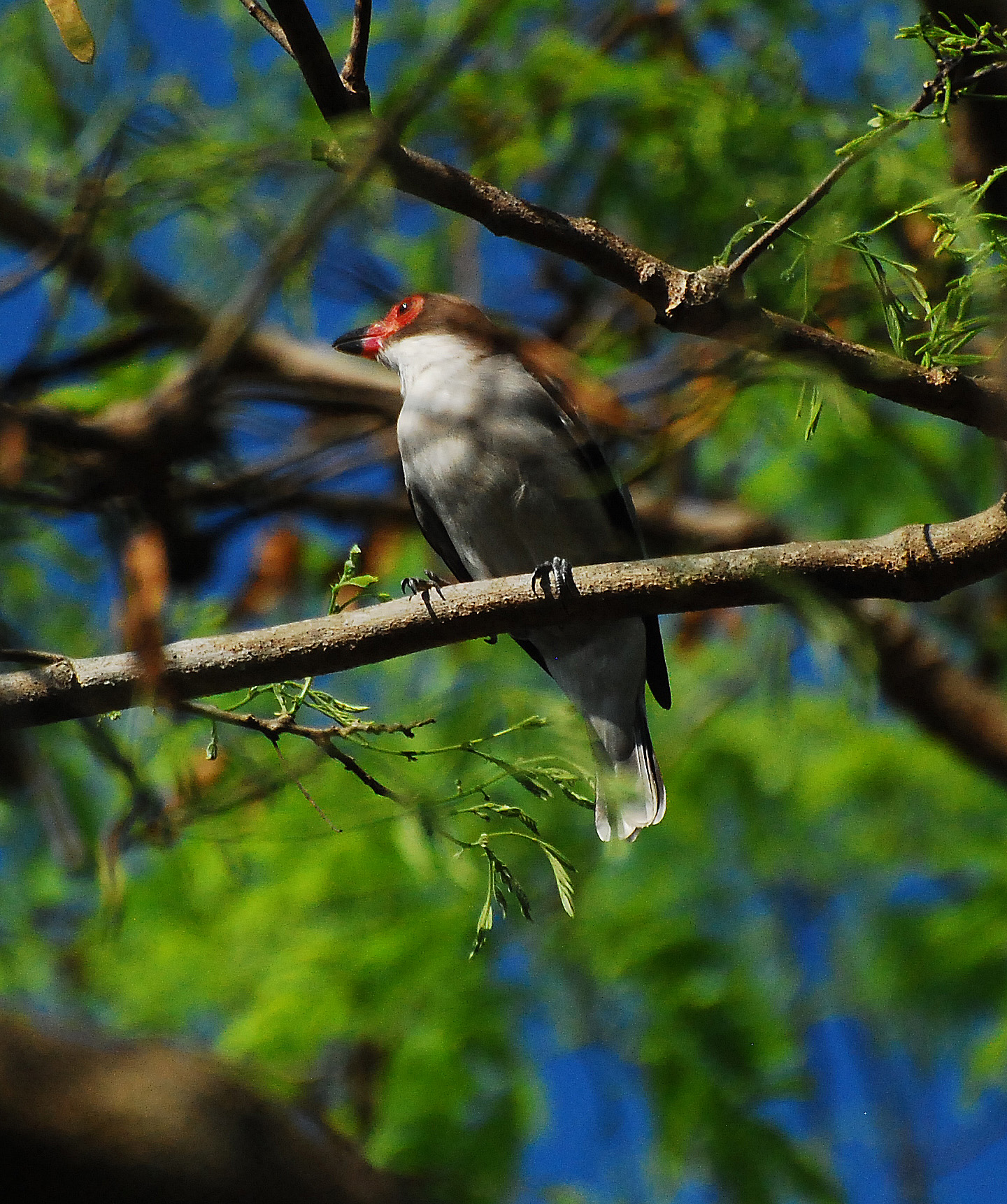
Masked tityra

Order: Passeriformes Family: Tityridae

Tityridae are suboscine passerine birds found in forest and woodland in the Neotropics. The species in this family were formerly spread over the families Tyrannidae, Pipridae, and Cotingidae. They are small to medium-sized birds. They do not have the sophisticated vocal capabilities of the songbirds. Most, but not all, have plain coloring.

- White-tailed tityra, Tityra leucura (E)
- Black-crowned tityra, Tityra inquisitor
- Black-tailed tityra, Tityra cayana
- Masked tityra, Tityra semifasciata
- Varzea schiffornis, Schiffornis major
- Olivaceous schiffornis, Schiffornis olivacea
- Brown-winged schiffornis, Schiffornis turdina
- Greenish schiffornis, Schiffornis virescens
- Cinereous mourner, Laniocera hypopyrra
- White-browed purpletuft, Iodopleura isabellae
- Dusky purpletuft, Iodopleura fusca
- Buff-throated purpletuft, Iodopleura pipra (E) (endangered)
- Shrike-like cotinga, Laniisoma elegans (near-threatened)
- White-naped xenopsaris, Xenopsaris albinucha
- Green-backed becard, Pachyramphus viridis
- Cinereous becard, Pachyramphus rufus
- Chestnut-crowned becard, Pachyramphus castaneus
- White-winged becard, Pachyramphus polychopterus
- Black-capped becard, Pachyramphus marginatus
- Glossy-backed becard, Pachyramphus surinamus
- Pink-throated becard, Pachyramphus minor
- Crested becard, Pachyramphus validus

== Sharpbill ==
Order: Passeriformes Family: Oxyruncidae

The sharpbill is a small bird of dense forests in Central and South America. It feeds mostly on fruit but also eats insects.

- Sharpbill, Oxyruncus cristatus

== Royal flycatchers ==
Order: Passeriformes Family: Onychorhynchidae

In 2019 the SACC determined that these six species, which were formerly considered tyrant flycatchers, belonged in their own family.

- Tropical royal-flycatcher, Onychorhynchus coronatus
- Atlantic royal-flycatcher, Onychorhynchus swainsoni (E)
- Ruddy-tailed flycatcher, Terenotriccus erythrurus
- Sulphur-rumped flycatcher, Myiobius barbatus
- Black-tailed flycatcher, Myiobius atricaudus

== Tyrant flycatchers ==
Order: Passeriformes Family: Tyrannidae

Tyrant flycatchers are passerine birds which occur throughout North and South America. They superficially resemble the Old World flycatchers, but are more robust and have stronger bills. They do not have the sophisticated vocal capabilities of the songbirds. Most, but not all, have plain coloring. As the name implies, most are insectivorous.

- Wing-barred piprites, Piprites chloris
- Black-capped piprites, Piprites pileata
- Kinglet calyptura, Calyptura cristata (E)
- Cinnamon manakin-tyrant, Neopipo cinnamomea
- Cinnamon-crested spadebill, Platyrinchus saturatus
- White-throated spadebill, Platyrinchus mystaceus
- Golden-crowned spadebill, Platyrinchus coronatus
- White-crested spadebill, Platyrinchus platyrhynchos
- Russet-winged spadebill, Platyrinchus leucoryphus
- Ringed antpipit, Corythopis torquatus
- Southern antpipit, Corythopis delalandi
- Serra do Mar bristle-tyrant, Pogonotriccus difficilis (E)
- Southern bristle-tyrant, Pogonotriccus eximius
- São Paulo bristle-tyrant, Pogonotriccus paulista
- Chapman's bristle-tyrant, Pogonotriccus chapmani
- Mottle-cheeked tyrannulet, Phylloscartes ventralis
- Restinga tyrannulet, Phylloscartes kronei (E)
- Bahia tyrannulet, Phylloscartes beckeri (E)
- Olive-green tyrannulet, Phylloscartes virescens
- Black-fronted tyrannulet, Phylloscartes nigrifrons
- Alagoas tyrannulet, Phylloscartes ceciliae (E)
- Minas Gerais tyrannulet, Phylloscartes roquettei (E)
- Oustalet's tyrannulet, Phylloscartes oustaleti (E)
- Bay-ringed tyrannulet, Phylloscartes sylviolus
- Ochre-bellied flycatcher, Mionectes oleagineus
- McConnell's flycatcher, Mionectes macconnelli
- Sierra de Lema flycatcher, Mionectes roraimae
- Gray-hooded flycatcher, Mionectes rufiventris
- Sepia-capped flycatcher, Leptopogon amaurocephalus
- Black-chested tyrant, Taeniotriccus andrei
- Brownish twistwing, Cnipodectes subbrunneus
- Rufous twistwing, Cnipodectes superrufus
- Olivaceous flatbill, Rhynchocyclus olivaceus
- Yellow-margined flatbill, Tolmomyias assimilis
- Gray-crowned flatbill, Tolmomyias poliocephalus
- Yellow-breasted flatbill, Tolmomyias flaviventris
- Olive-faced flatbill, Tolmomyias viridiceps
- Yellow-olive flatbill, Tolmomyias sulphurescens
- Eared pygmy-tyrant, Myiornis auricularis
- Short-tailed pygmy-tyrant, Myiornis ecaudatus
- Double-banded pygmy-tyrant, Lophotriccus vitiosus
- Long-crested pygmy-tyrant, Lophotriccus eulophotes
- Helmeted pygmy-tyrant, Lophotriccus galeatus
- Pale-eyed pygmy-tyrant, Atalotriccus pilaris
- Snethlage's tody-tyrant, Hemitriccus minor
- Acre tody-tyrant, Hemitriccus cohnhafti
- Flammulated pygmy-tyrant, Hemitriccus flammulatus
- Drab-breasted pygmy-tyrant, Hemitriccus diops
- Brown-breasted pygmy-tyrant, Hemitriccus obsoletus
- Boat-billed tody-tyrant, Hemitriccus josephinae
- White-eyed tody-tyrant, Hemitriccus zosterops
- White-bellied tody-tyrant, Hemitriccus griseipectus
- Eye-ringed tody-tyrant, Hemitriccus orbitatus (E)
- Johannes's tody-tyrant, Hemitriccus iohannis
- Stripe-necked tody-tyrant, Hemitriccus striaticollis
- Hangnest tody-tyrant, Hemitriccus nidipendulus (E)
- Pearly-vented tody-tyrant, Hemitriccus margaritaceiventer
- Pelzeln's tody-tyrant, Hemitriccus inornatus
- Zimmer's tody-tyrant, Hemitriccus minimus
- Buff-breasted tody-tyrant, Hemitriccus mirandae (E)
- Kaempfer's tody-tyrant, Hemitriccus kaempferi (E)
- Fork-tailed pygmy-tyrant, Hemitriccus furcatus (E)
- White-cheeked tody-flycatcher, Poecilotriccus albifacies
- Black-and-white tody-flycatcher, Poecilotriccus capitalis
- Buff-cheeked tody-flycatcher, Poecilotriccus senex (E)
- Ruddy tody-flycatcher, Poecilotriccus russatus
- Ochre-faced tody-flycatcher, Poecilotriccus plumbeiceps
- Smoky-fronted tody-flycatcher, Poecilotriccus fumifrons
- Rusty-fronted tody-flycatcher, Poecilotriccus latirostris
- Slate-headed tody-flycatcher, Poecilotriccus sylvia
- Spotted tody-flycatcher, Todirostrum maculatum
- Gray-headed tody-flycatcher, Todirostrum poliocephalum (E)
- Common tody-flycatcher, Todirostrum cinereum
- Painted tody-flycatcher, Todirostrum pictum
- Yellow-browed tody-flycatcher, Todirostrum chrysocrotaphum
- Cliff flycatcher, Hirundinea ferruginea
- Chico's tyrannulet, Zimmerius chicomendesi (E)
- Slender-footed tyrannulet, Zimmerius gracilipes
- Guianan tyrannulet, Zimmerius acer
- Lesser wagtail-tyrant, Stigmatura napensis
- Greater wagtail-tyrant, Stigmatura budytoides
- Plain tyrannulet, Inezia inornata
- Amazonian tyrannulet, Inezia subflava
- Pale-tipped tyrannulet, Inezia caudata
- Fulvous-crowned scrub-tyrant, Euscarthmus meloryphus
- Rufous-sided scrub-tyrant, Euscarthmus rufomarginatus
- Yellow-bellied elaenia, Elaenia flavogaster
- Large elaenia, Elaenia spectabilis
- Noronha elaenia, Elaenia ridleyana (E)
- White-crested elaenia, Elaenia albiceps
- Small-billed elaenia, Elaenia parvirostris
- Olivaceous elaenia, Elaenia mesoleuca
- Brownish elaenia, Elaenia pelzelni
- Plain-crested elaenia, Elaenia cristata
- Lesser elaenia, Elaenia chiriquensis
- Rufous-crowned elaenia, Elaenia ruficeps
- Tepui elaenia, Elaenia olivina
- Great elaenia, Elaenia dayi
- Small-headed elaenia, Elaenia sordida
- Yellow-crowned tyrannulet, Tyrannulus elatus
- Forest elaenia, Myiopagis gaimardii
- Gray elaenia, Myiopagis caniceps
- Yellow-crowned elaenia, Myiopagis flavivertex
- Greenish elaenia, Myiopagis viridicata
- Suiriri flycatcher, Suiriri suiriri
- Yellow tyrannulet, Capsiempis flaveola
- White-throated tyrannulet, Mecocerculus leucophrys
- Greenish tyrannulet, Phyllomyias virescens
- Reiser's tyrannulet, Phyllomyias reiseri
- Yungas tyrannulet, Phyllomyias weedeni
- Planalto tyrannulet, Phyllomyias fasciatus
- Sooty-headed tyrannulet, Phyllomyias griseiceps
- Gray-capped tyrannulet, Phyllomyias griseocapilla (E)
- Rough-legged tyrannulet, Acrochordopus burmeisteri
- Amazonian beardless-tyrannulet, Camptostoma napaeum
- Southeastern beardless-tyrannulet, Camptostoma obsoletum
- White-lored tyrannulet, Ornithion inerme
- Mouse-colored tyrannulet, Nesotriccus murinus
- Bearded tachuri, Polystictus pectoralis
- Gray-backed tachuri, Polystictus superciliaris (E)
- Sharp-tailed tyrant, Culicivora caudacuta
- Crested doradito, Pseudocolopteryx sclateri
- Subtropical doradito, Pseudocolopteryx acutipennis
- Dinelli's doradito, Pseudocolopteryx dinelliana (U)
- Warbling doradito, Pseudocolopteryx flaviventris
- River tyrannulet, Serpophaga hypoleuca
- Sooty tyrannulet, Serpophaga nigricans
- White-crested tyrannulet, Serpophaga subcristata
- Straneck's tyrannulet, Serpophaga griseicapilla
- Rufous-tailed attila, Attila phoenicurus
- Cinnamon attila, Attila cinnamomeus
- Citron-bellied attila, Attila citriniventris
- Dull-capped attila, Attila bolivianus
- Gray-hooded attila, Attila rufus (E)
- Bright-rumped attila, Attila spadiceus
- Piratic flycatcher, Legatus leucophaius
- Large-headed flatbill, Ramphotrigon megacephalum
- Rufous-tailed flatbill, Ramphotrigon ruficauda
- Dusky-tailed flatbill, Ramphotrigon fuscicauda
- Great kiskadee, Pitangus sulphuratus
- Lesser kiskadee, Philohydor lictor
- Cattle tyrant, Machetornis rixosa
- Sulphury flycatcher, Tyrannopsis sulphurea
- Boat-billed flycatcher, Megarynchus pitangua
- Sulphur-bellied flycatcher, Myiodynastes luteiventris (V)
- Streaked flycatcher, Myiodynastes maculatus
- Rusty-margined flycatcher, Myiozetetes cayanensis
- Social flycatcher, Myiozetetes similis
- Gray-capped flycatcher, Myiozetetes granadensis
- Dusky-chested flycatcher, Myiozetetes luteiventris
- Yellow-throated flycatcher, Conopias parvus
- Three-striped flycatcher, Conopias trivirgatus
- Variegated flycatcher, Empidonomus varius
- Crowned slaty flycatcher, Empidonomus aurantioatrocristatus
- White-throated kingbird, Tyrannus albogularis
- Tropical kingbird, Tyrannus melancholicus
- Fork-tailed flycatcher, Tyrannus savana
- Eastern kingbird, Tyrannus tyrannus
- Gray kingbird, Tyrannus dominicensis
- Grayish mourner, Rhytipterna simplex
- Pale-bellied mourner, Rhytipterna immunda
- Rufous casiornis, Casiornis rufus
- Ash-throated casiornis, Casiornis fuscus (E)
- White-rumped sirystes, Sirystes albocinereus
- Todd's sirystes, Sirystes subcanescens
- Sibilant sirystes, Sirystes sibilator
- Dusky-capped flycatcher, Myiarchus tuberculifer
- Swainson's flycatcher, Myiarchus swainsoni
- Short-crested flycatcher, Myiarchus ferox
- Brown-crested flycatcher, Myiarchus tyrannulus
- Long-tailed tyrant, Colonia colonus
- Roraiman flycatcher, Myiophobus roraimae
- Bran-colored flycatcher, Myiophobus fasciatus
- Chapada flycatcher, Guyramemua affine
- Amazonian scrub-flycatcher, Sublegatus obscurior
- Southern scrub-flycatcher, Sublegatus modestus
- Vermilion flycatcher, Pyrocephalus rubinus
- Pied water-tyrant, Fluvicola pica
- Black-backed water-tyrant, Fluvicola albiventer
- Masked water-tyrant, Fluvicola nengeta
- White-headed marsh tyrant, Arundinicola leucocephala
- Streamer-tailed tyrant, Gubernetes yetapa
- Black-and-white monjita, Heteroxolmis dominicana
- Cock-tailed tyrant, Alectrurus tricolor
- Strange-tailed tyrant, Alectrurus risora (V)
- Austral negrito, Lessonia rufa
- Spectacled tyrant, Hymenops perspicillatus
- Riverside tyrant, Knipolegus orenocensis
- Rufous-tailed tyrant, Knipolegus poecilurus
- Amazonian black-tyrant, Knipolegus poecilocercus
- Caatinga black-tyrant, Knipolegus franciscanus (E)
- Crested black-tyrant, Knipolegus lophotes
- Velvety black-tyrant, Knipolegus nigerrimus (E)
- Blue-billed black-tyrant, Knipolegus cyanirostris
- Cinereous tyrant, Knipolegus striaticeps (V)
- White-winged black-tyrant, Knipolegus aterrimus (V)
- Hudson's black-tyrant, Knipolegus hudsoni (V)
- Yellow-browed tyrant, Satrapa icterophrys
- Little ground-tyrant, Muscisaxicola fluviatilis
- Spot-billed ground-tyrant, Muscisaxicola maculirostris (V)
- Dark-faced ground-tyrant, Muscisaxicola maclovianus (V)
- Cinnamon-bellied ground-tyrant, Muscisaxicola capistratus (V)
- White-rumped monjita, Xolmis velatus
- White monjita, Xolmis irupero
- Gray monjita, Nengetus cinereus
- Black-crowned monjita, Neoxolmis coronatus
- Rusty-backed monjita, Neoxolmis rubetra (V)
- Chocolate-vented tyrant, Neoxolmis rufiventris (V)
- Gray-bellied shrike-tyrant, Agriornis micropterus (V)
- Lesser shrike-tyrant, Agriornis murinus (V)
- Drab water tyrant, Ochthornis littoralis
- Fuscous flycatcher, Cnemotriccus fuscatus
- Euler's flycatcher, Lathrotriccus euleri
- Alder flycatcher, Empidonax alnorum
- Olive-sided flycatcher, Contopus cooperi
- Smoke-colored pewee, Contopus fumigatus
- Western wood-pewee, Contopus sordidulus (V)
- Eastern wood-pewee, Contopus virens
- Tropical pewee, Contopus cinereus
- White-throated pewee, Contopus albogularis
- Blackish pewee, Contopus nigrescens
- Shear-tailed gray tyrant, Muscipipra vetula
- Many-colored rush tyrant, Tachuris rubrigastra
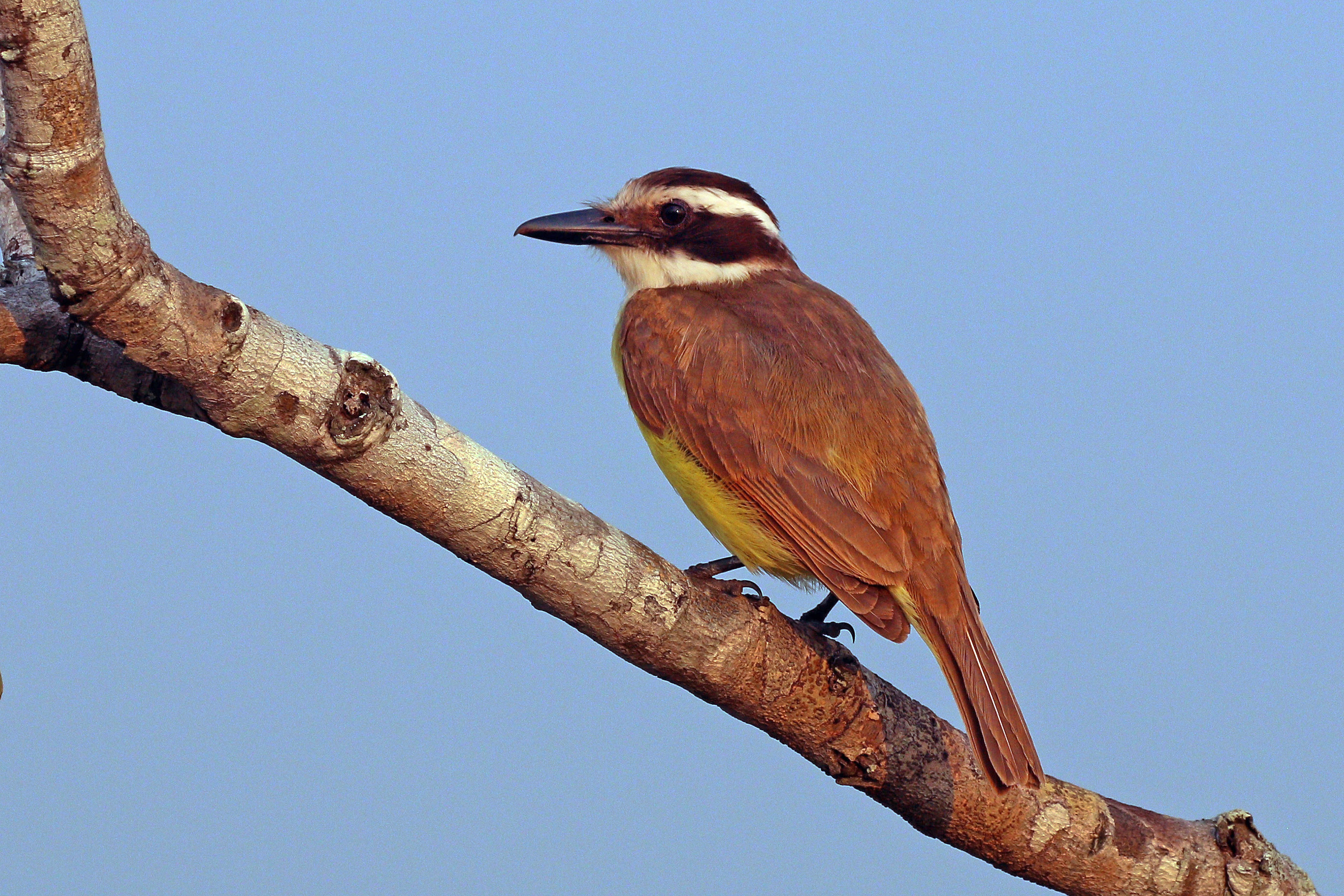
Great kiskadee

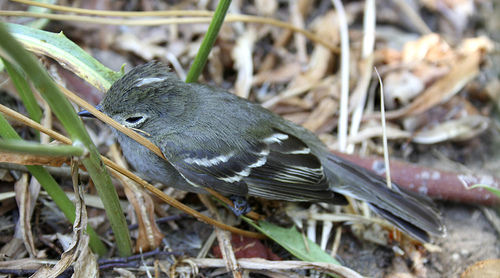
White-crested elaenia

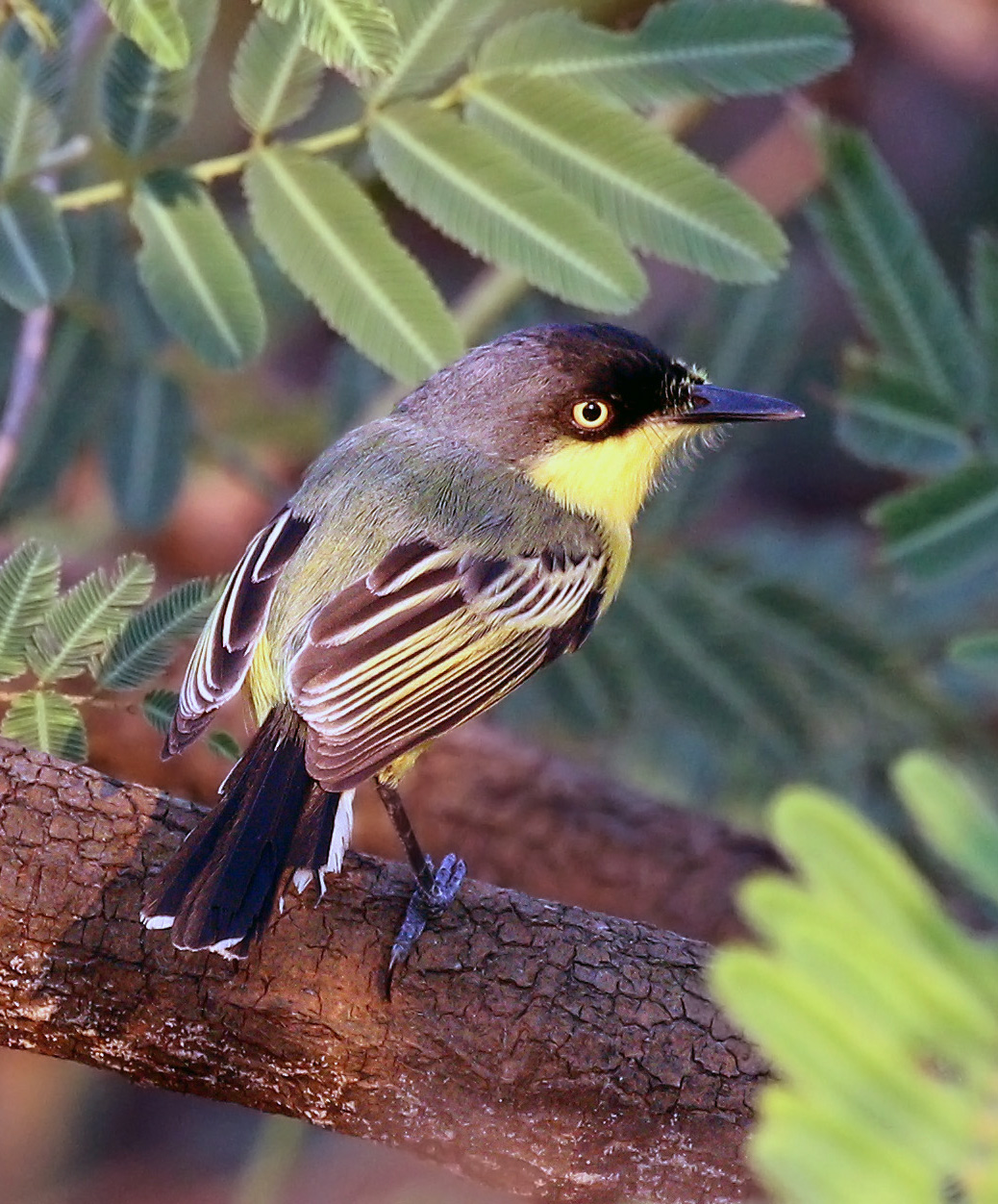
Common tody-flycatcher

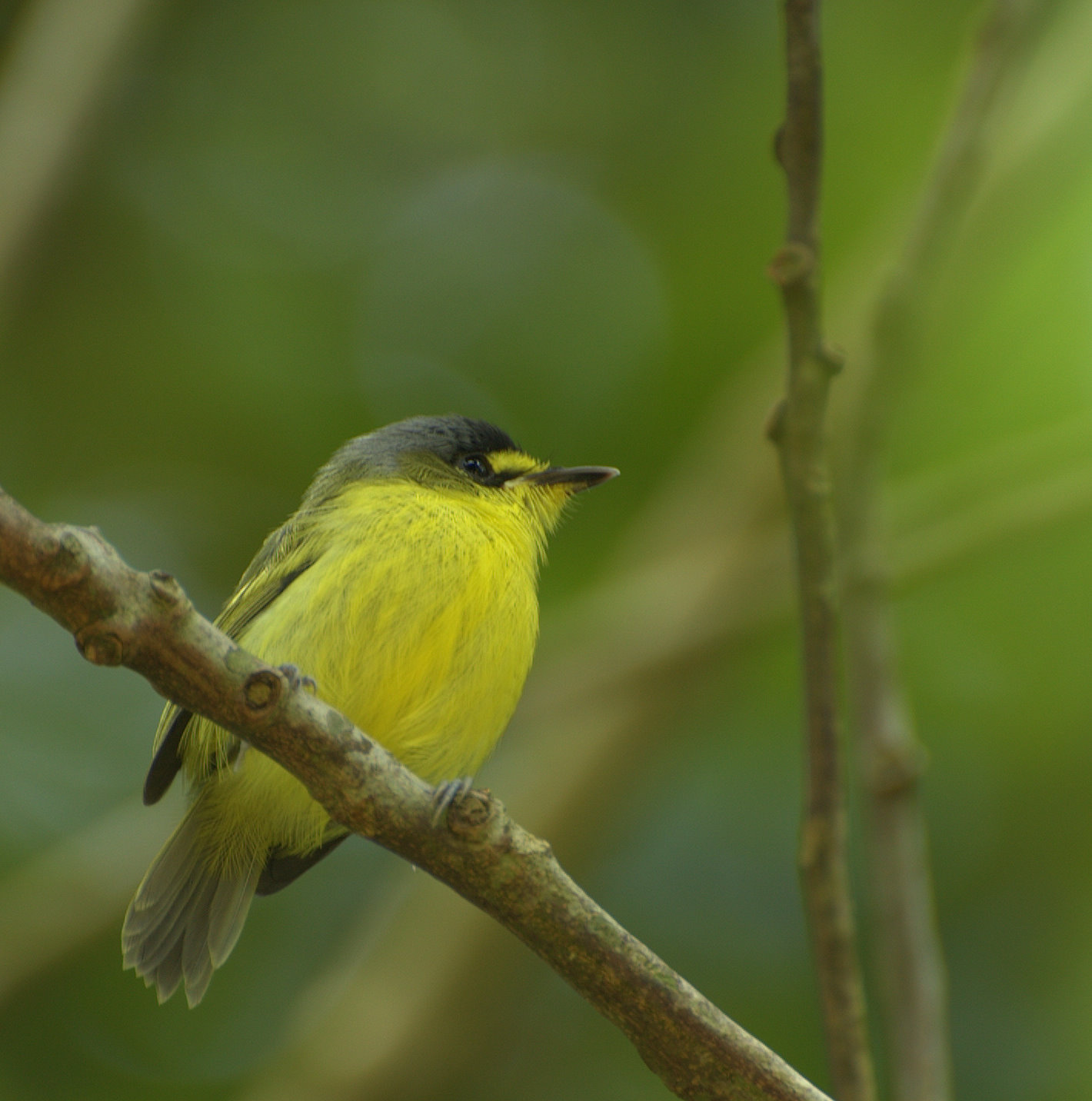
Gray-headed tody-flycatcher

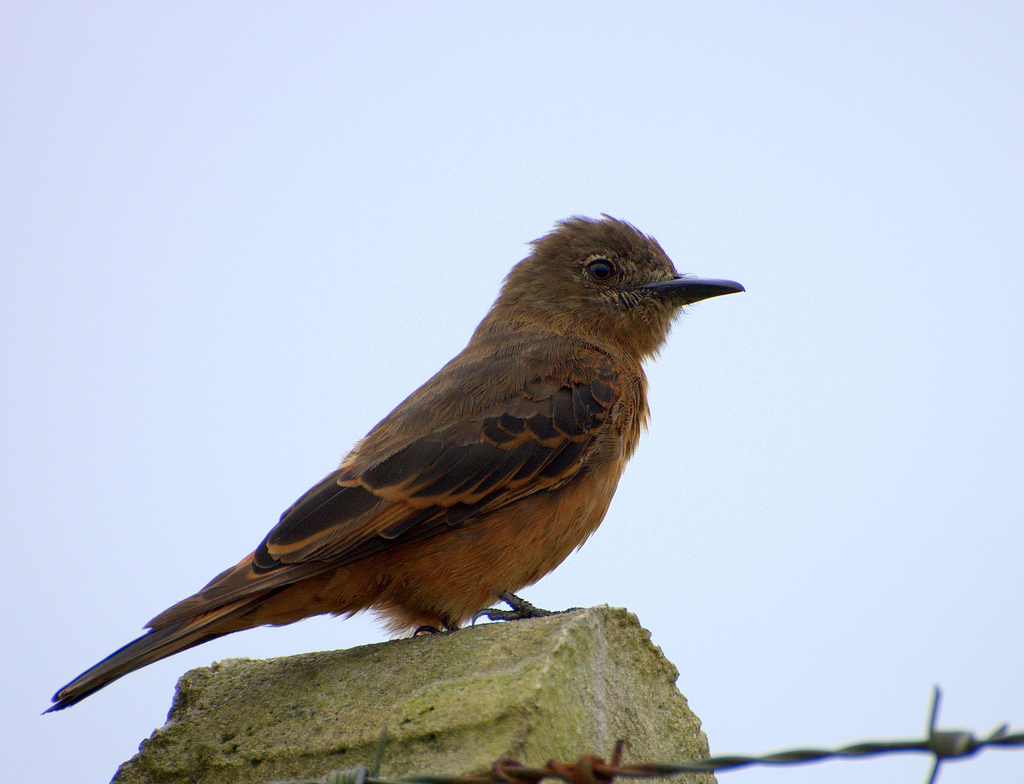
Cliff flycatcher

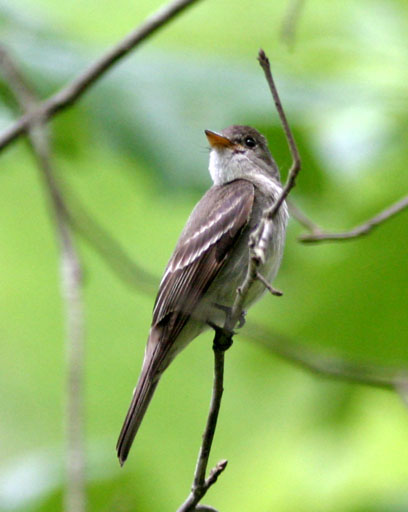
Eastern wood-pewee

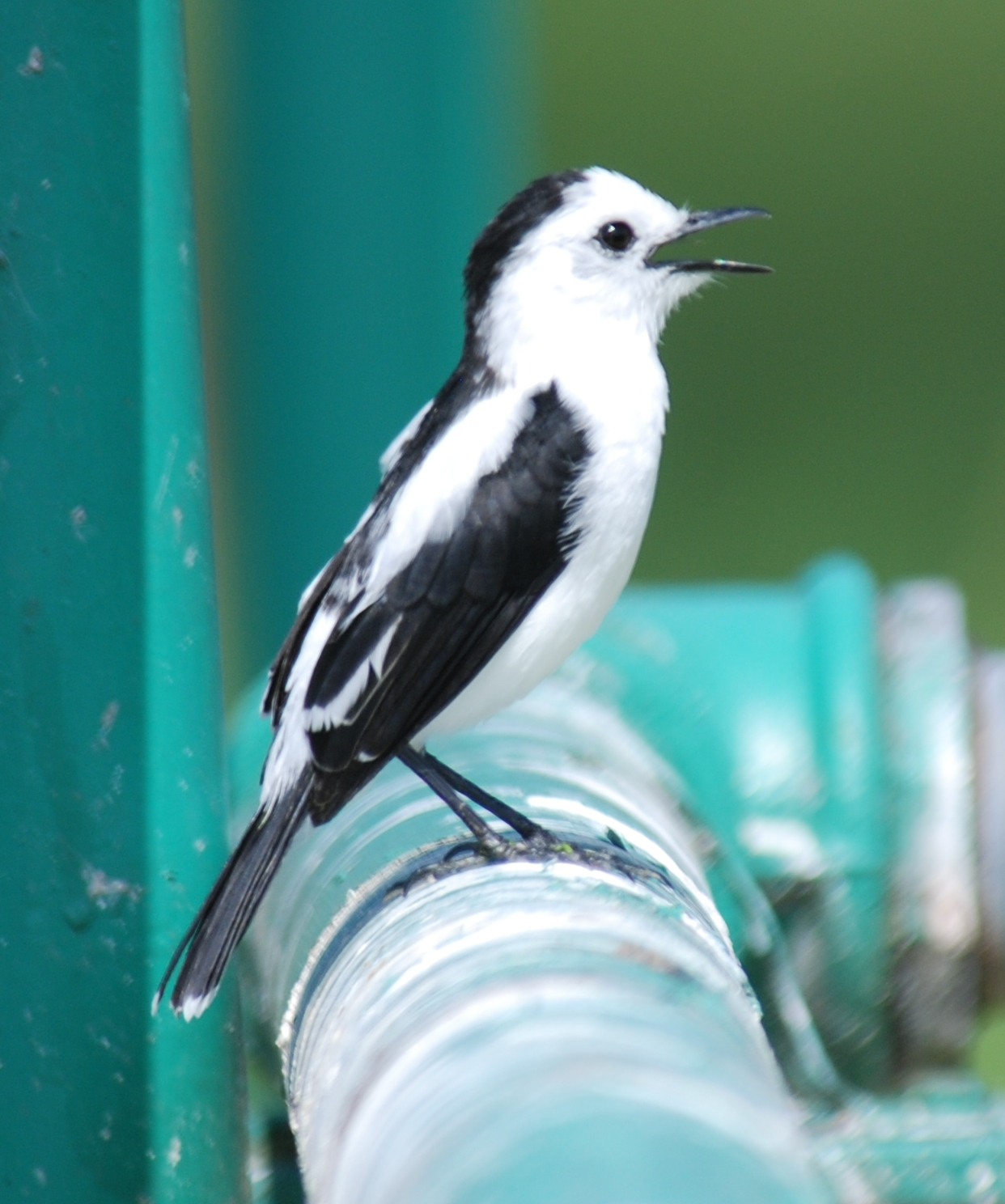
Pied water-tyrant

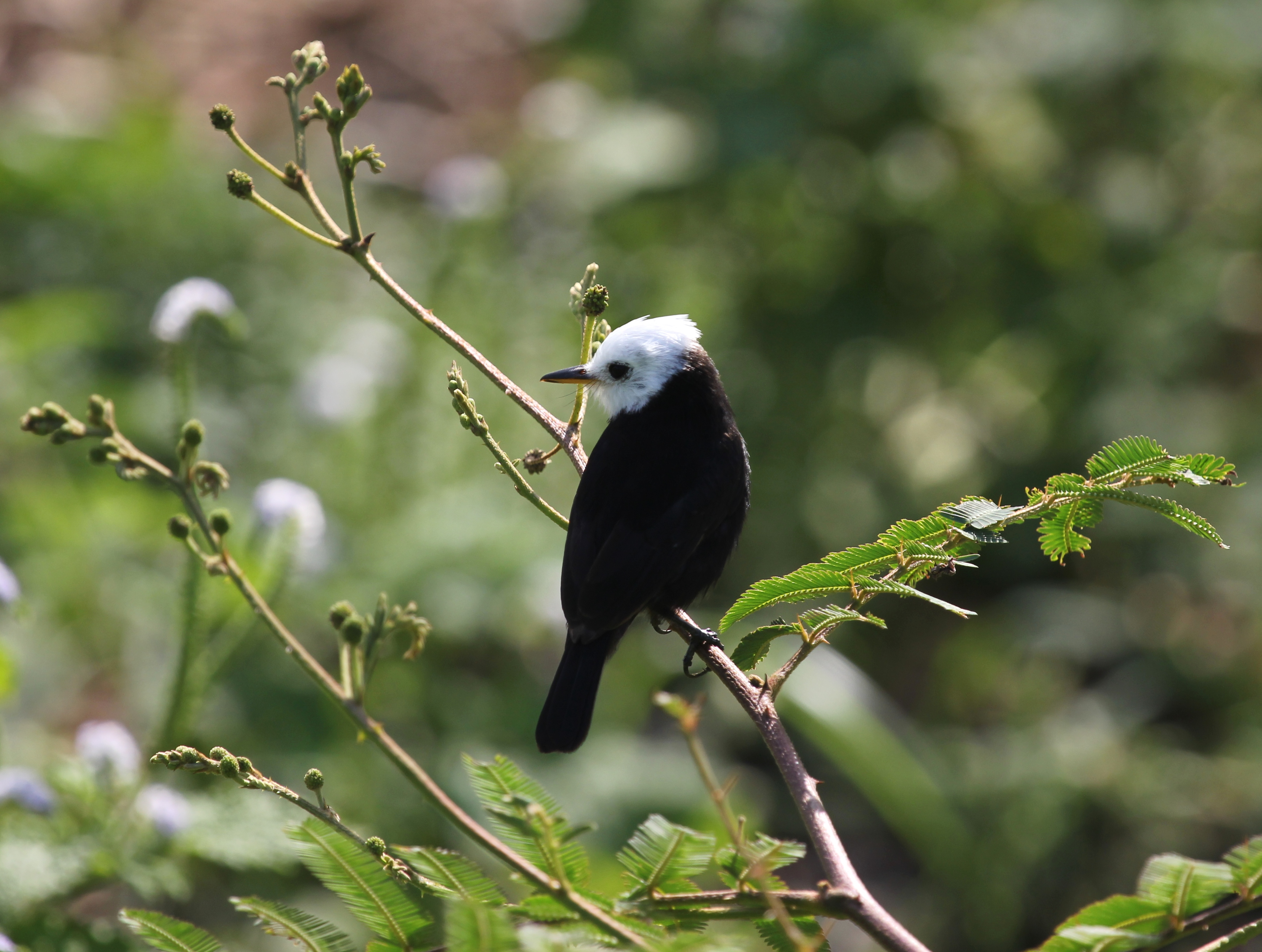
White-headed marsh tyrant

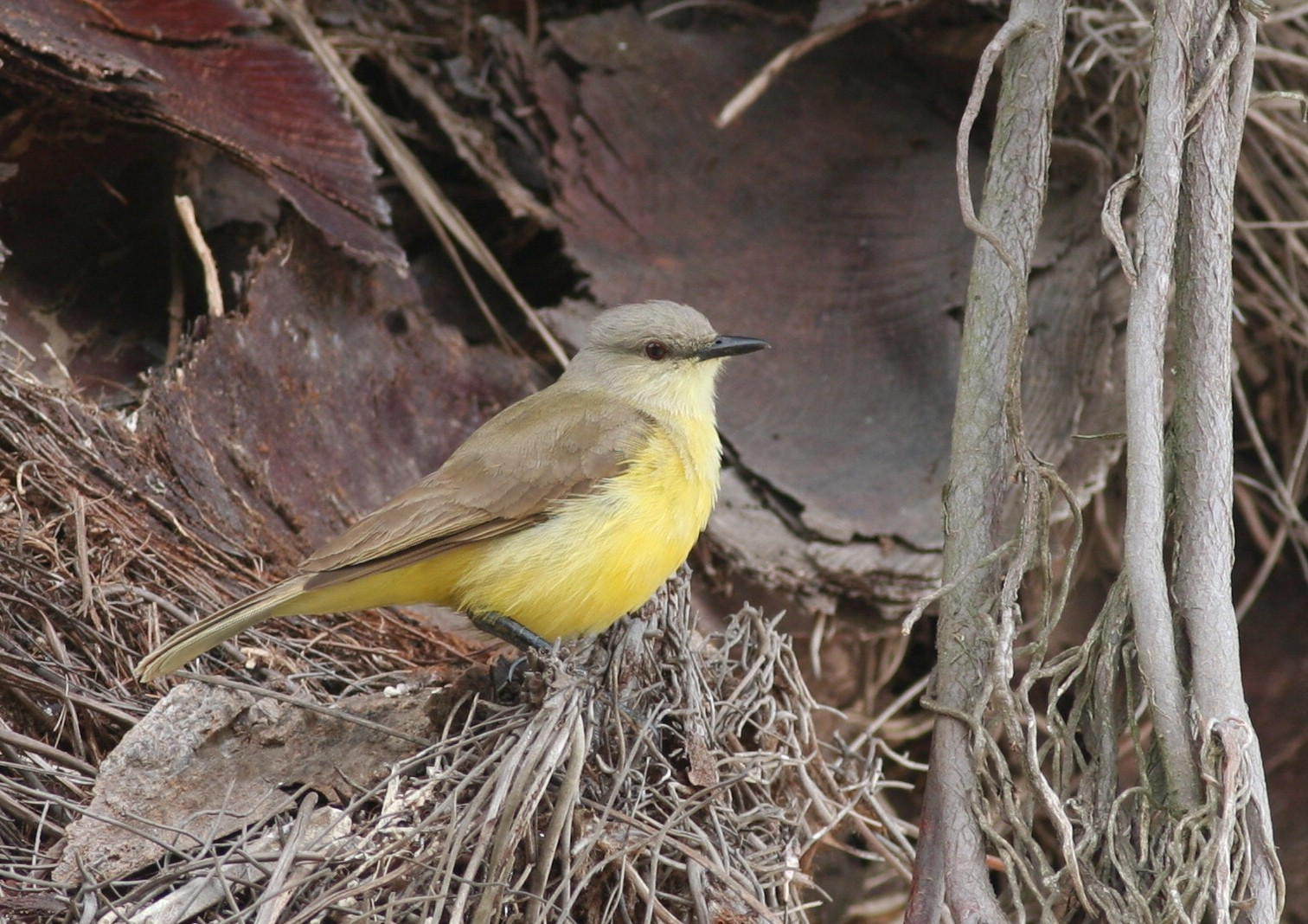
Cattle tyrant

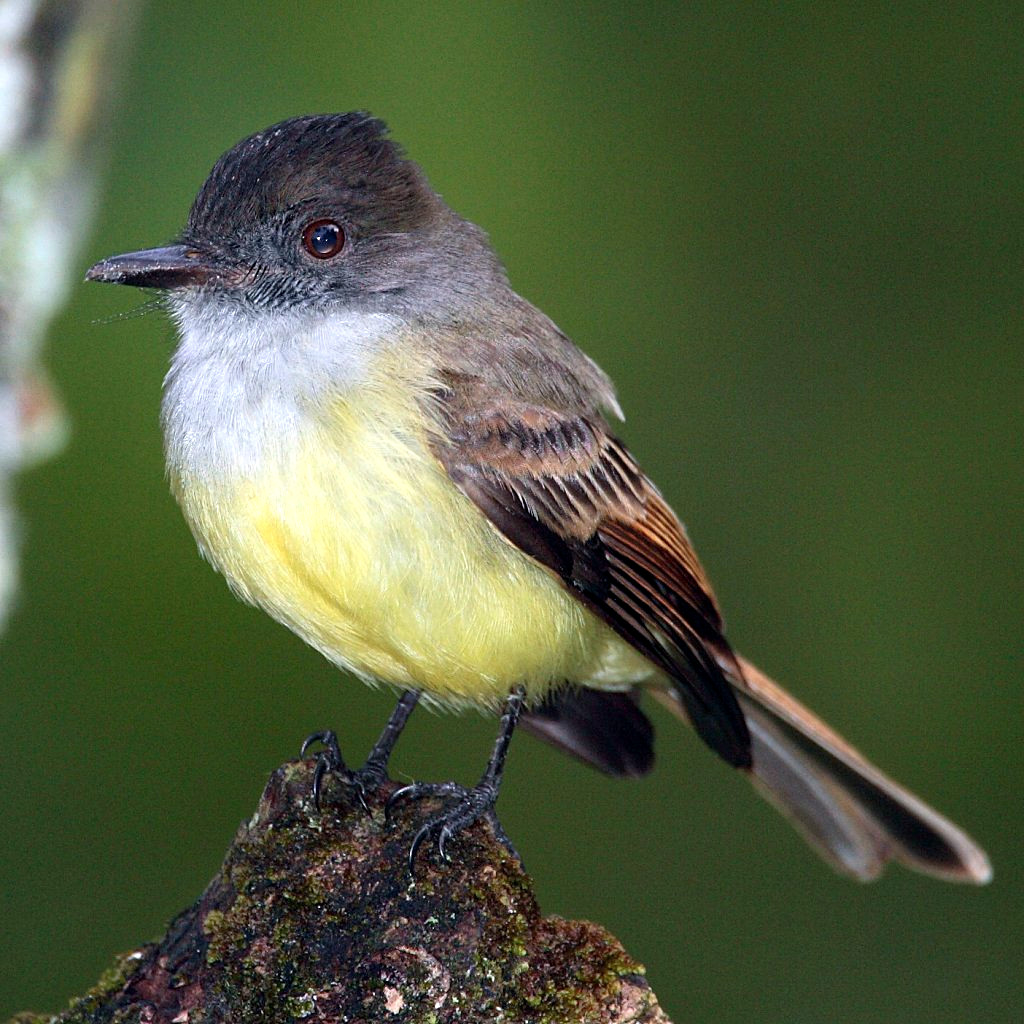
Dusky-capped flycatcher

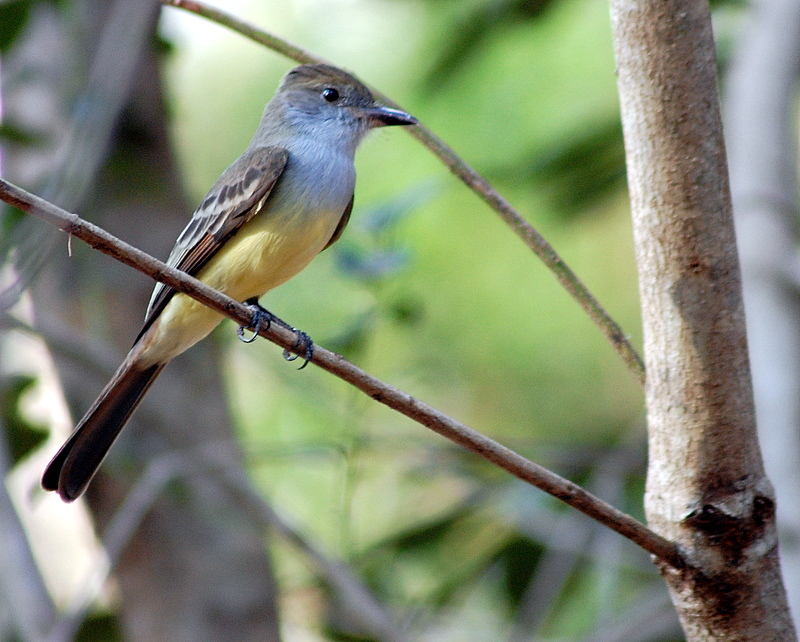
Short-crested flycatcher

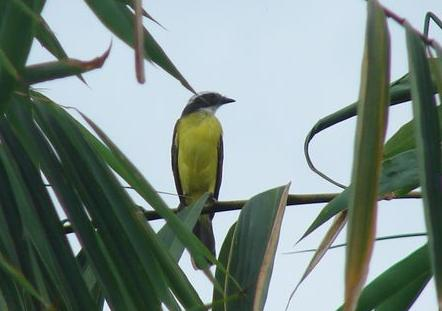
Rusty-margined flycatcher

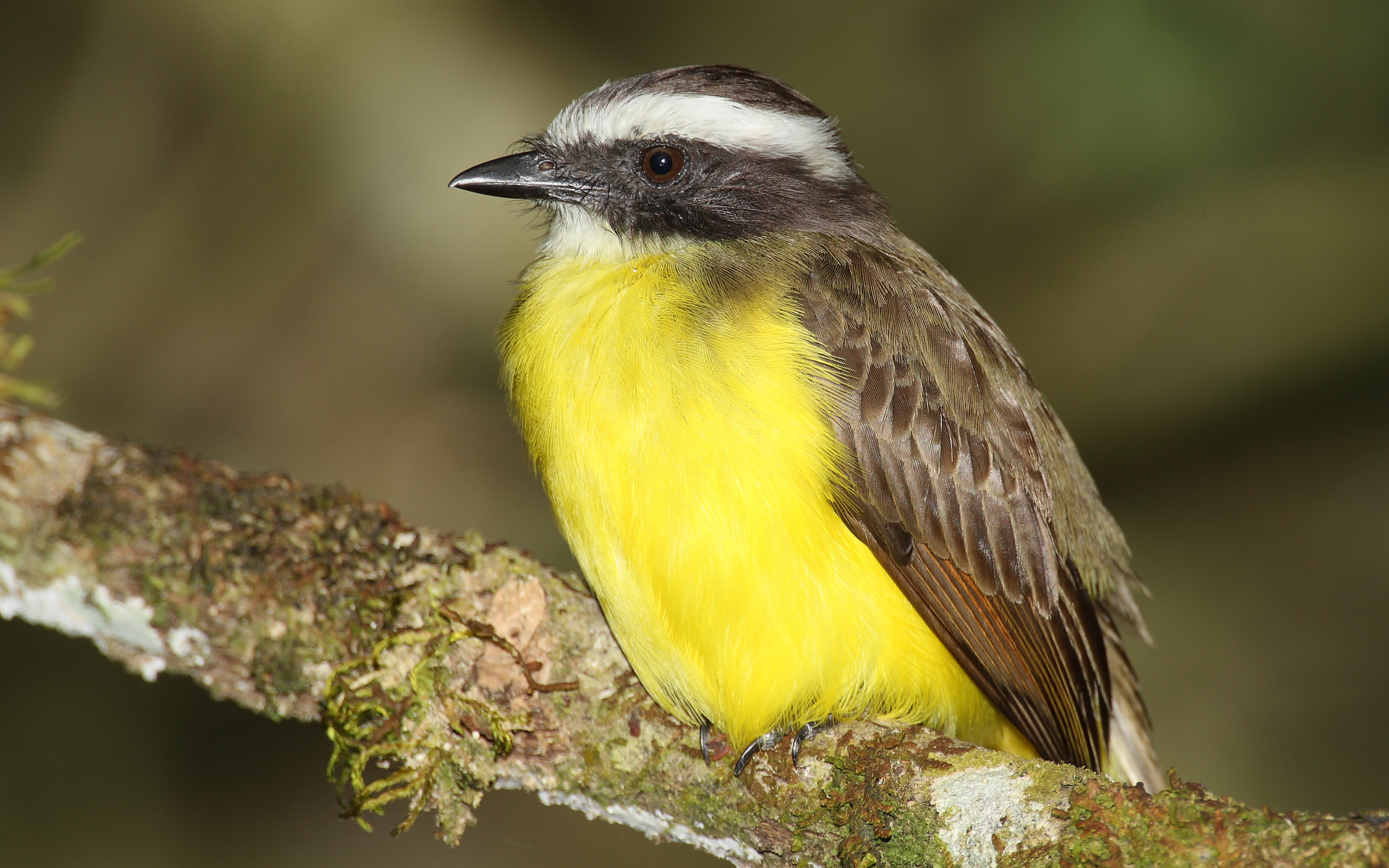
Social flycatcher

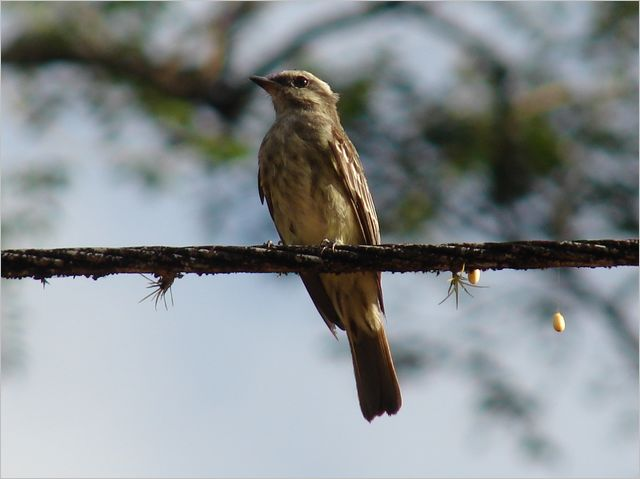
Piratic flycatcher

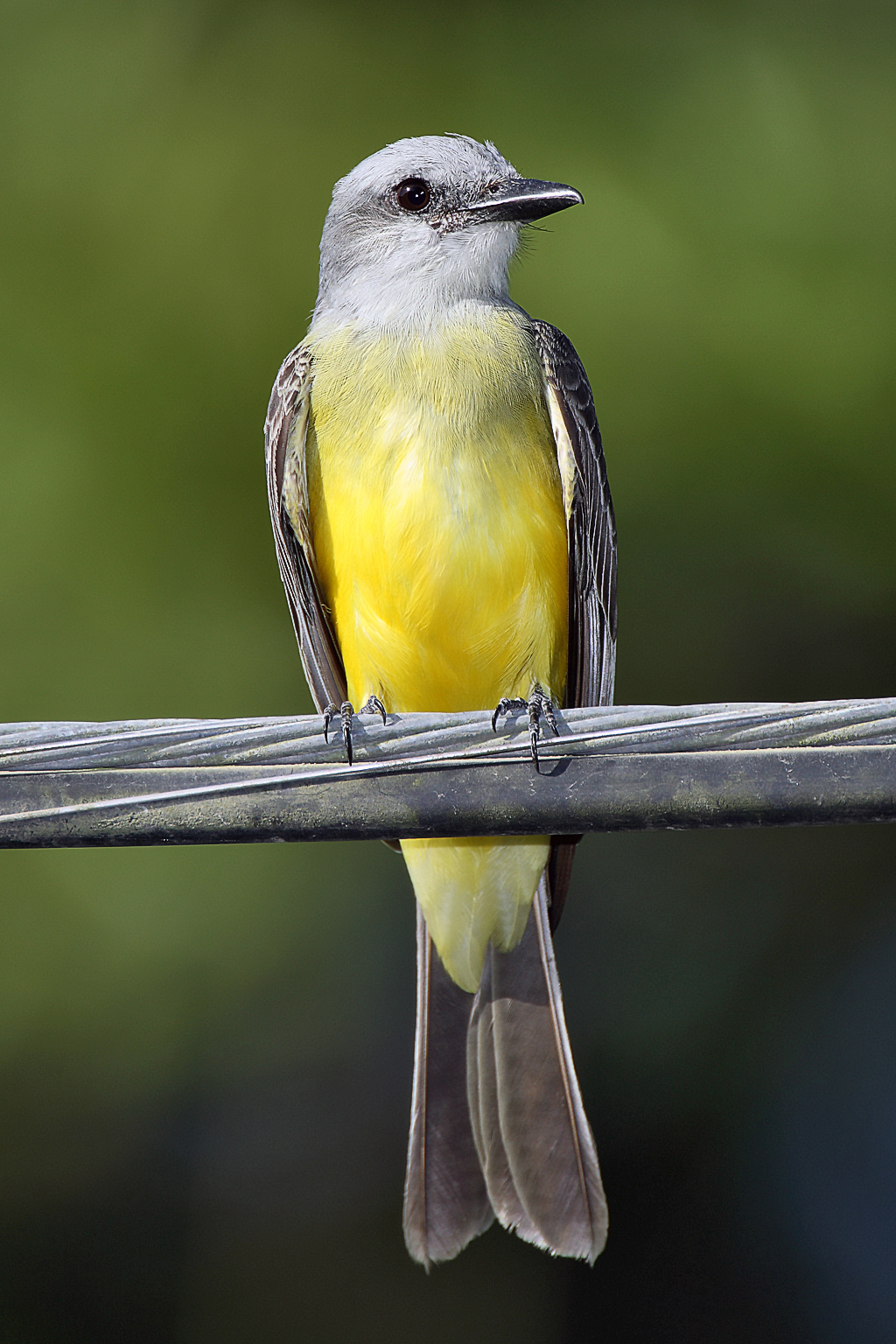
Tropical kingbird

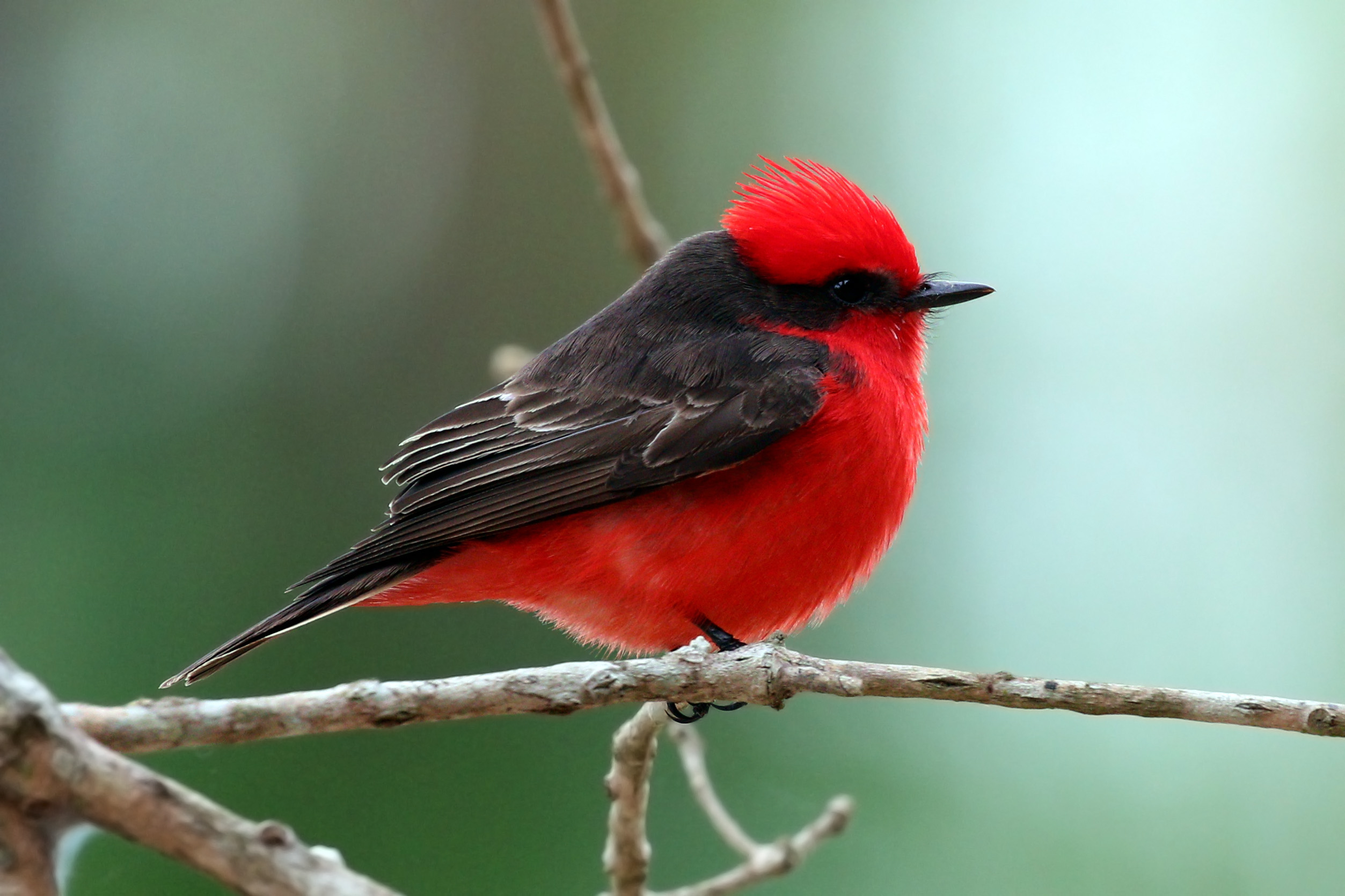
Vermilion flycatcher

== Vireos ==
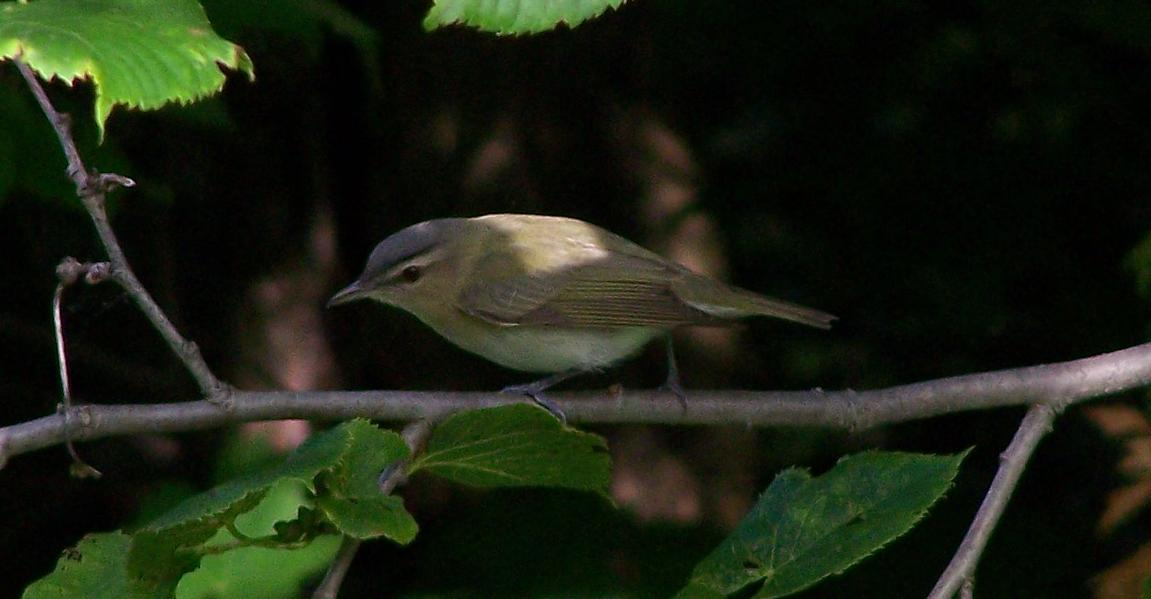
Red-eyed vireo

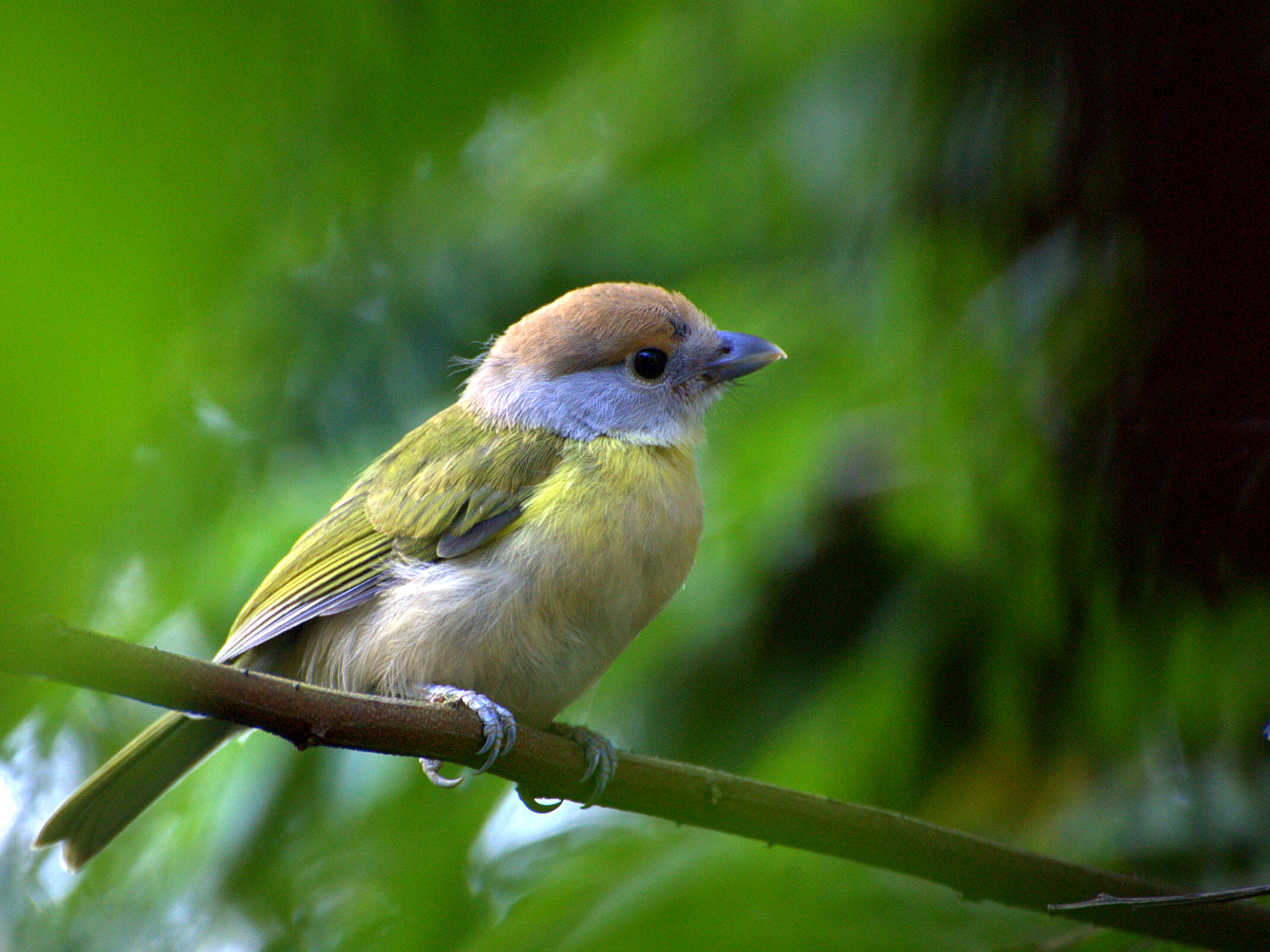
Rufous-browed peppershrike

Order: Passeriformes Family: Vireonidae

The vireos are a group of small to medium-sized passerine birds. They are typically greenish in color and resemble wood warblers apart from their heavier bills.

- Rufous-browed peppershrike, Cyclarhis gujanensis
- Gray-eyed greenlet, Hylophilus amaurocephalus (E)
- Rufous-crowned greenlet, Hylophilus poicilotis
- Ashy-headed greenlet, Hylophilus pectoralis
- Gray-chested greenlet, Hylophilus semicinereus
- Brown-headed greenlet, Hylophilus brunneiceps
- Lemon-chested greenlet, Hylophilus thoracicus
- Slaty-capped shrike-vireo, Vireolanius leucotis
- Rufous-fronted brownlet, Tunchiornis ferrugineifrons
- Guianan brownlet, Tunchiornis luteifrons
- Para brownlet, Tunchiornis rubrifrons (E)
- Dusky-capped greenlet, Pachysylvia hypoxantha
- Buff-cheeked greenlet, Pachysylvia muscicapina
- Tepui vireo, Vireo sclateri
- Red-eyed vireo, Vireo olivaceus
- Chivi vireo, Vireo chivi
- Noronha vireo, Vireo gracilirostris (E) (near-threatened)
- Yellow-green vireo, Vireo flavoviridis
- Black-whiskered vireo, Vireo altiloquus

== Shrikes ==
Order: Passeriformes Family: Laniidae

Shrikes are passerine birds known for their habit of catching other birds and small animals and impaling the uneaten portions of their bodies on thorns. A shrike's beak is hooked, like that of a typical bird of prey.

- Woodchat shrike, Lanius senator (UC)(V)

== Jays ==
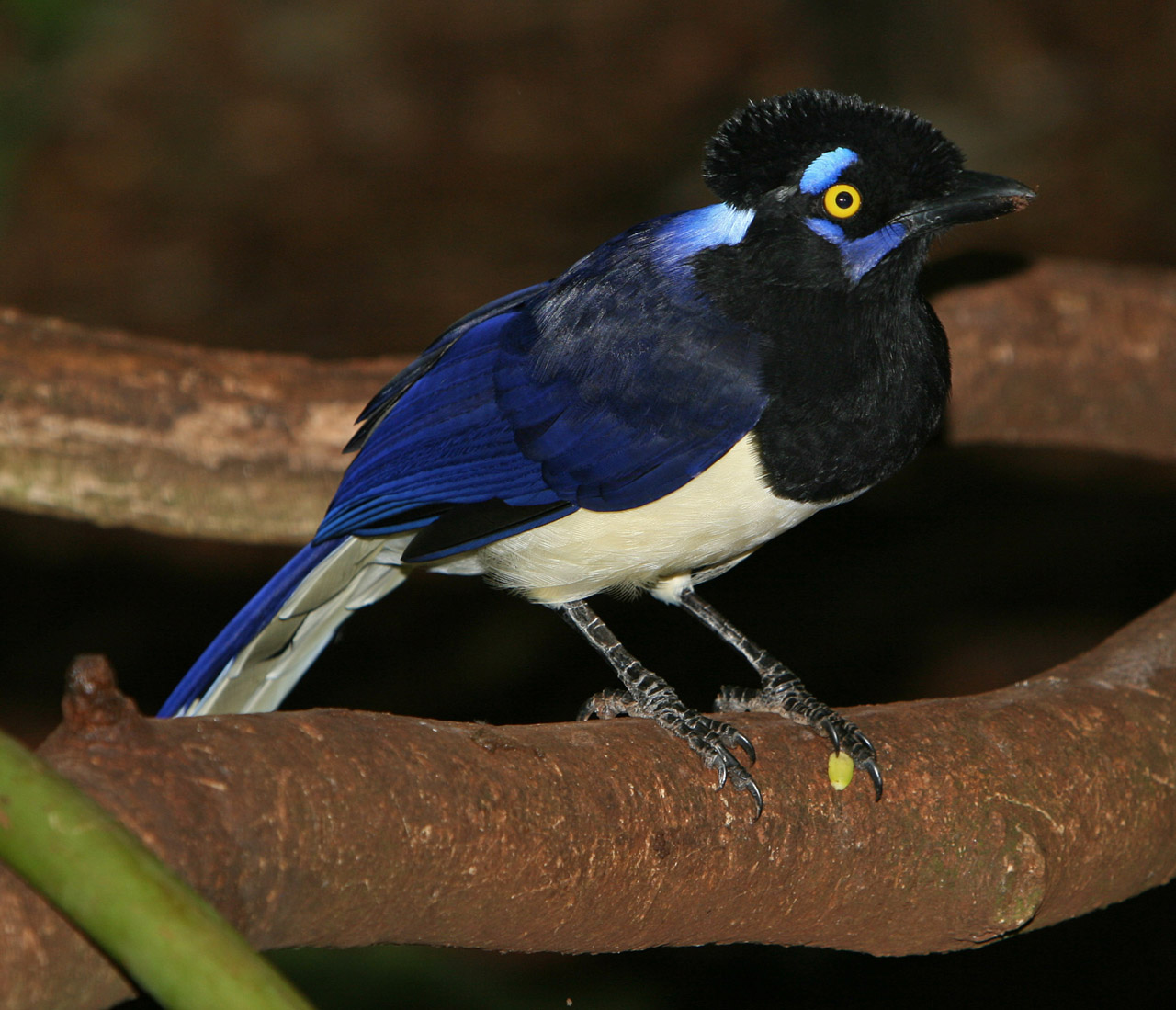
Plush-crested jay

Order: Passeriformes Family: Corvidae

The family Corvidae includes crows, ravens, jays, choughs, magpies, treepies, nutcrackers, and ground jays. Corvids are above average in size among the Passeriformes, and some of the larger species show high levels of intelligence.

- Eurasian jay, Garrulus glandarius (UC)(V)
- Violaceous jay, Cyanocorax violaceus
- Purplish jay, Cyanocorax cyanomelas
- Azure jay, Cyanocorax caeruleus (near-threatened)
- Curl-crested jay, Cyanocorax cristatellus
- Cayenne jay, Cyanocorax cayanus
- Azure-naped jay, Cyanocorax heilprini
- Plush-crested jay, Cyanocorax chrysops
- White-naped jay, Cyanocorax cyanopogon (E)

== Swallows ==
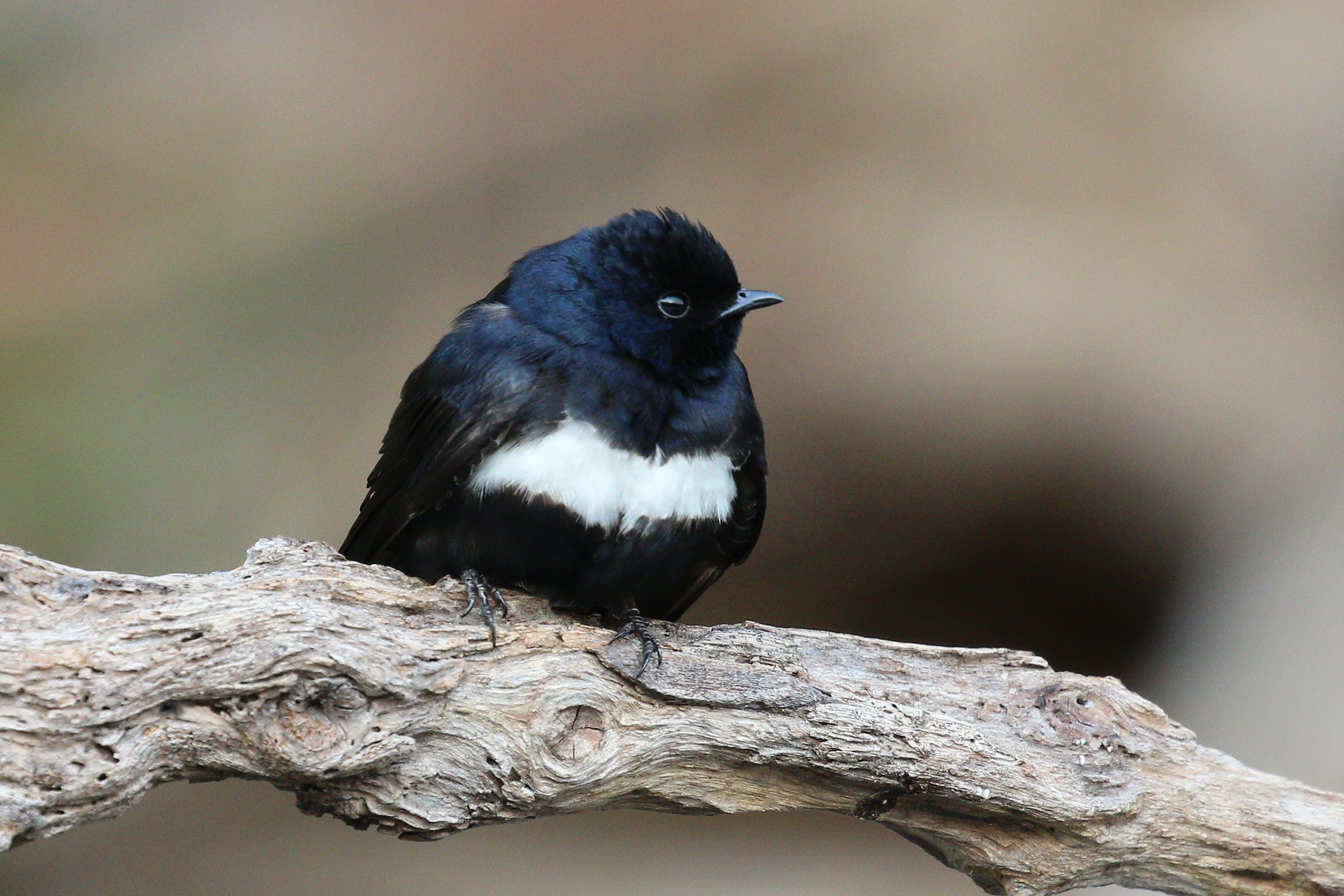
White-banded swallow

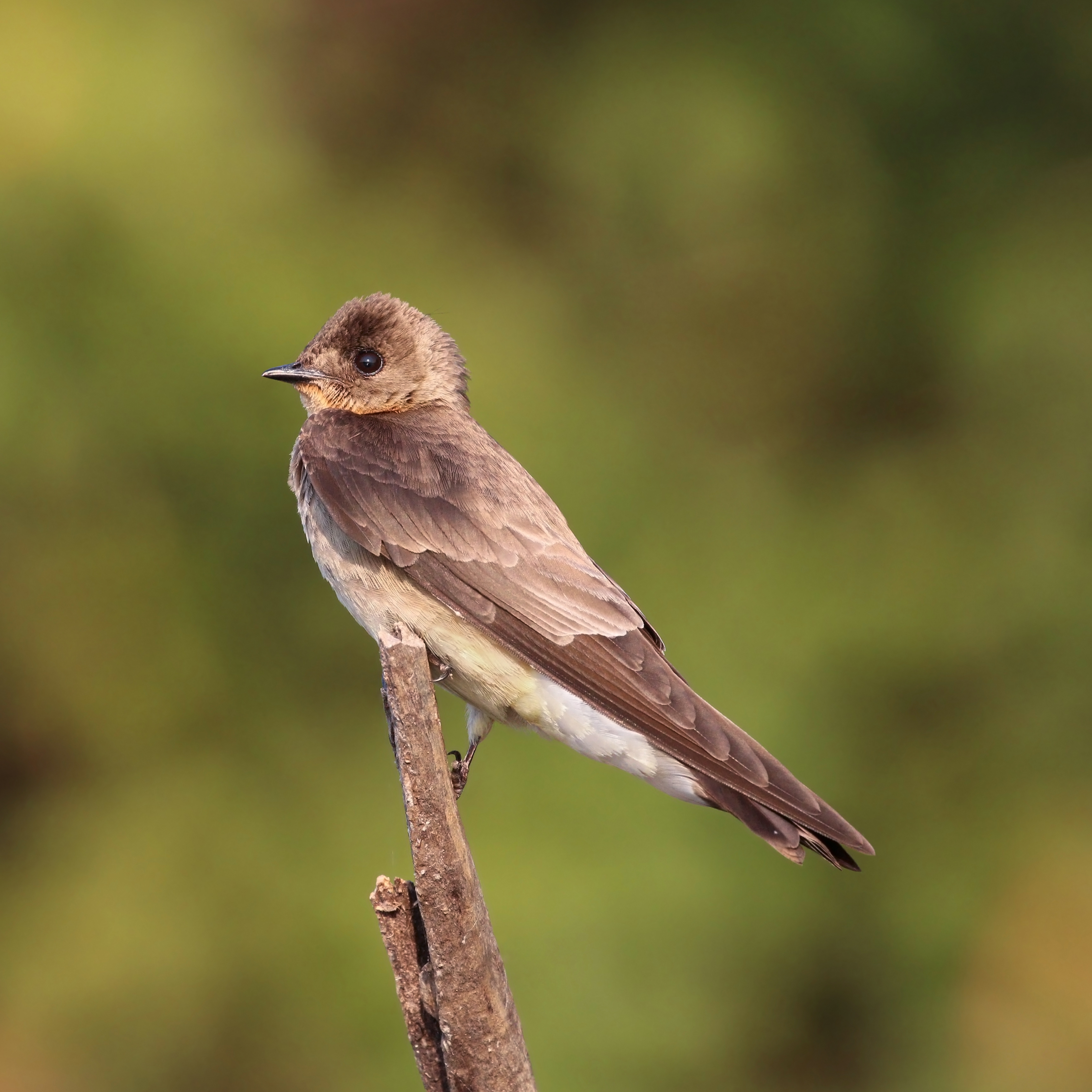
Southern rough-winged swallow

Order: Passeriformes Family: Hirundinidae

The family Hirundinidae is adapted to aerial feeding. They have a slender streamlined body, long pointed wings, and a short bill with a wide gape. The feet are adapted to perching rather than walking, and the front toes are partially joined at the base.

- Blue-and-white swallow, Pygochelidon cyanoleuca
- Black-collared swallow, Pygochelidon melanoleuca
- Tawny-headed swallow, Alopochelidon fucata
- White-banded swallow, Atticora fasciata
- White-thighed swallow, Atticora tibialis
- Southern rough-winged swallow, Stelgidopteryx ruficollis
- Brown-chested martin, Progne tapera
- Purple martin, Progne subis
- Caribbean martin, Progne dominicensis (V)
- Cuban martin, Progne cryptoleuca (V)
- Gray-breasted martin, Progne chalybea
- Southern martin, Progne elegans
- White-winged swallow, Tachycineta albiventer
- White-rumped swallow, Tachycineta leucorrhoa
- Chilean swallow, Tachycineta leucopyga
- Bank swallow, Riparia riparia
- Barn swallow, Hirundo rustica
- Cliff swallow, Petrochelidon pyrrhonota

== Wrens ==
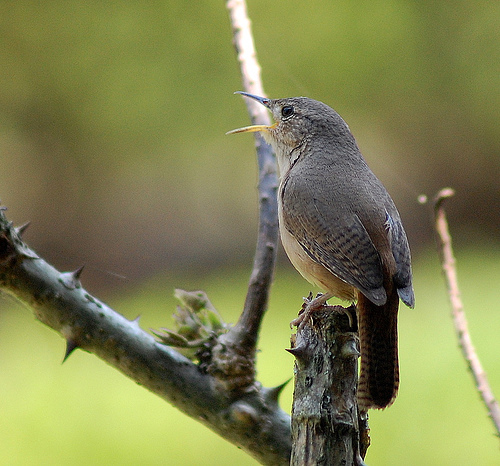
Southern house-wren

Order: Passeriformes Family: Troglodytidae

The wrens are mainly small and inconspicuous except for their loud songs. These birds have short wings and thin down-turned bills. Several species often hold their tails upright. All are insectivorous.

- Scaly-breasted wren, Microcerculus marginatus
- Flutist wren, Microcerculus ustulatus
- Wing-banded wren, Microcerculus bambla
- Tooth-billed wren, Odontorchilus cinereus
- Southern house-wren, Troglodytes musculus
- Tepui wren, Troglodytes rufulus
- Grass wren, Cistothorus platensis
- Bicolored wren, Campylorhynchus griseus
- Thrush-like wren, Campylorhynchus turdinus
- Moustached wren, Pheugopedius genibarbis
- Coraya wren, Pheugopedius coraya
- Buff-breasted wren, Cantorchilus leucotis
- Long-billed wren, Cantorchilus longirostris (E)
- Fawn-breasted wren, Cantorchilus guarayanus
- Gray wren, Cantorchilus griseus (E)
- White-breasted wood-wren, Henicorhina leucosticta
- Musician wren, Cyphorhinus arada

== Gnatcatchers ==
Order: Passeriformes Family: Polioptilidae

These dainty birds resemble Old World warblers in their build and habits, moving restlessly through the foliage seeking insects. The gnatcatchers and gnatwrens are mainly soft bluish gray in color and have the typical insectivore's long sharp bill. They are birds of fairly open woodland or scrub, which nest in bushes or trees.

- Collared gnatwren, Microbates collaris
- Trilling gnatwren, Ramphocaenus melanurus
- Chattering gnatwren, Ramphocaenus sticturus
- Tropical gnatcatcher, Polioptila plumbea
- Rio Negro gnatcatcher, Polioptila facilis
- Creamy-bellied gnatcatcher, Polioptila lactea (near-threatened)
- Guianan gnatcatcher, Polioptila guianensis
- Klages's gnatcatcher, Polioptila paraensis
- Inambari gnatcatcher, Polioptila attenboroughi (E)
- Masked gnatcatcher, Polioptila dumicola

== Donacobius ==
Order: Passeriformes Family: Donacobiidae

The black-capped donacobius is found in wet habitats from Panama across northern South America and east of the Andes to Argentina and Paraguay.

- Black-capped donacobius Donacobius atricapilla

== Thrushes ==
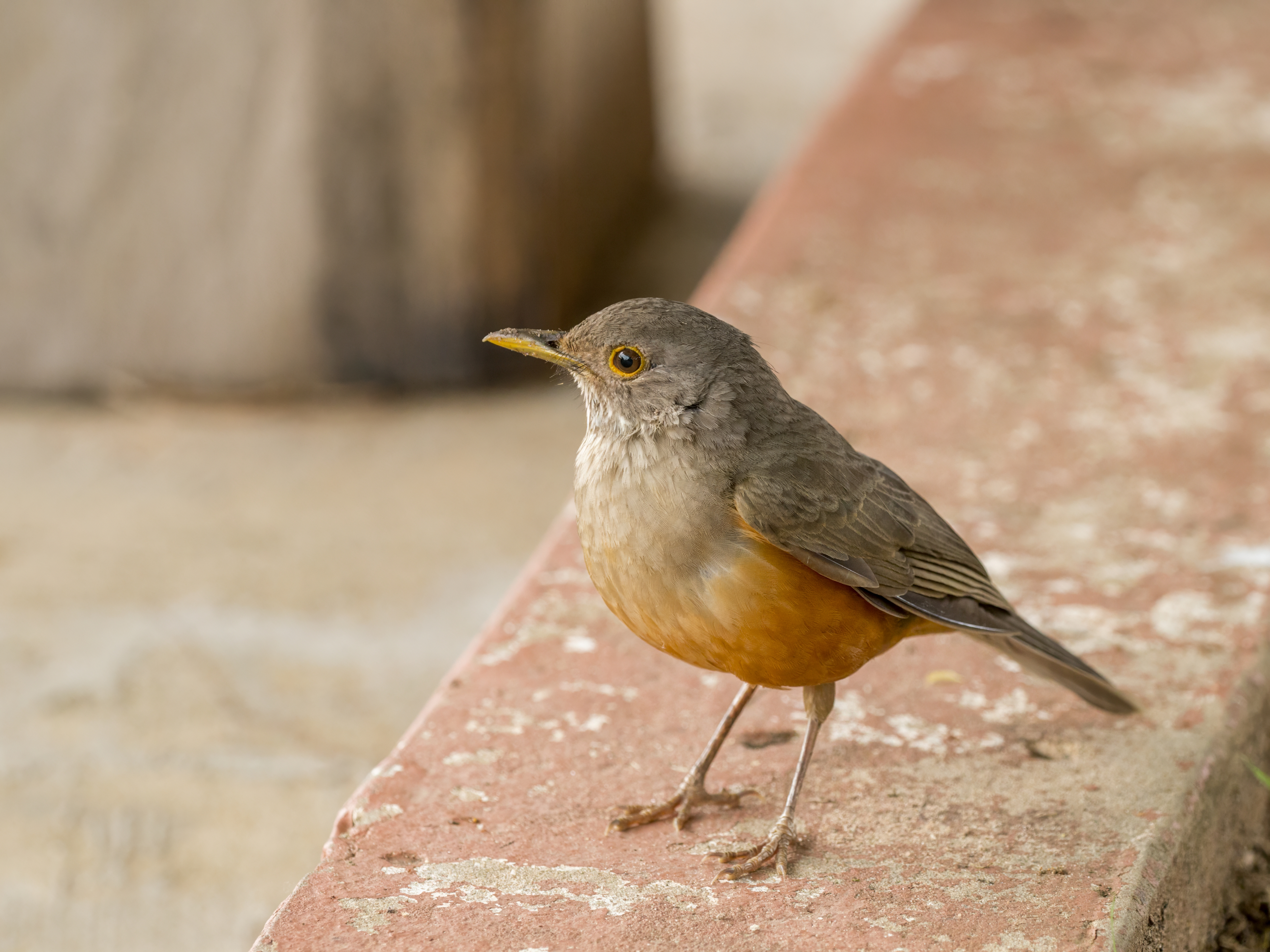
Rufous-bellied thrush

Order: Passeriformes Family: Turdidae

The thrushes are a group of passerine birds that occur mainly in the Old World. They are plump, soft plumaged, small to medium-sized insectivores or sometimes omnivores, often feeding on the ground. Many have attractive songs.

- Orange-billed nightingale-thrush, Catharus aurantiirostris
- Veery, Catharus fuscescens
- Gray-cheeked thrush, Catharus minimus
- Swainson's thrush, Catharus ustulatus
- Rufous-brown solitaire, Cichlopsis leucogenys
- Pale-eyed thrush, Turdus leucops
- Yellow-legged thrush, Turdus flavipes
- Pale-breasted thrush, Turdus leucomelas
- Cocoa thrush, Turdus fumigatus
- Redwing, Turdus iliacus (UC)(V)
- Hauxwell's thrush, Turdus hauxwelli
- Rufous-bellied thrush, Turdus rufiventris
- Spectacled thrush, Turdus nudigenis
- Varzea thrush, Turdus sanchezorum
- Lawrence's thrush, Turdus lawrencii
- Pantepui thrush, Turdus murinus
- Creamy-bellied thrush, Turdus amaurochalinus
- Black-billed thrush, Turdus ignobilis
- Campina thrush, Turdus arthuri
- Black-hooded thrush, Turdus olivater
- Blacksmith thrush, Turdus subalaris
- Gray-flanked thrush, Turdus phaeopygus
- Rufous-flanked thrush, Turdus albicollis

== Old World flycatchers ==
Order: Passeriformes Family: Muscicapidae

The Old World flycatchers form a large family of small passerine birds. These are mainly small arboreal insectivores, many of which, as the name implies, take their prey on the wing.

- European robin, Erithacus rubecula (UC)

== Mockingbirds ==
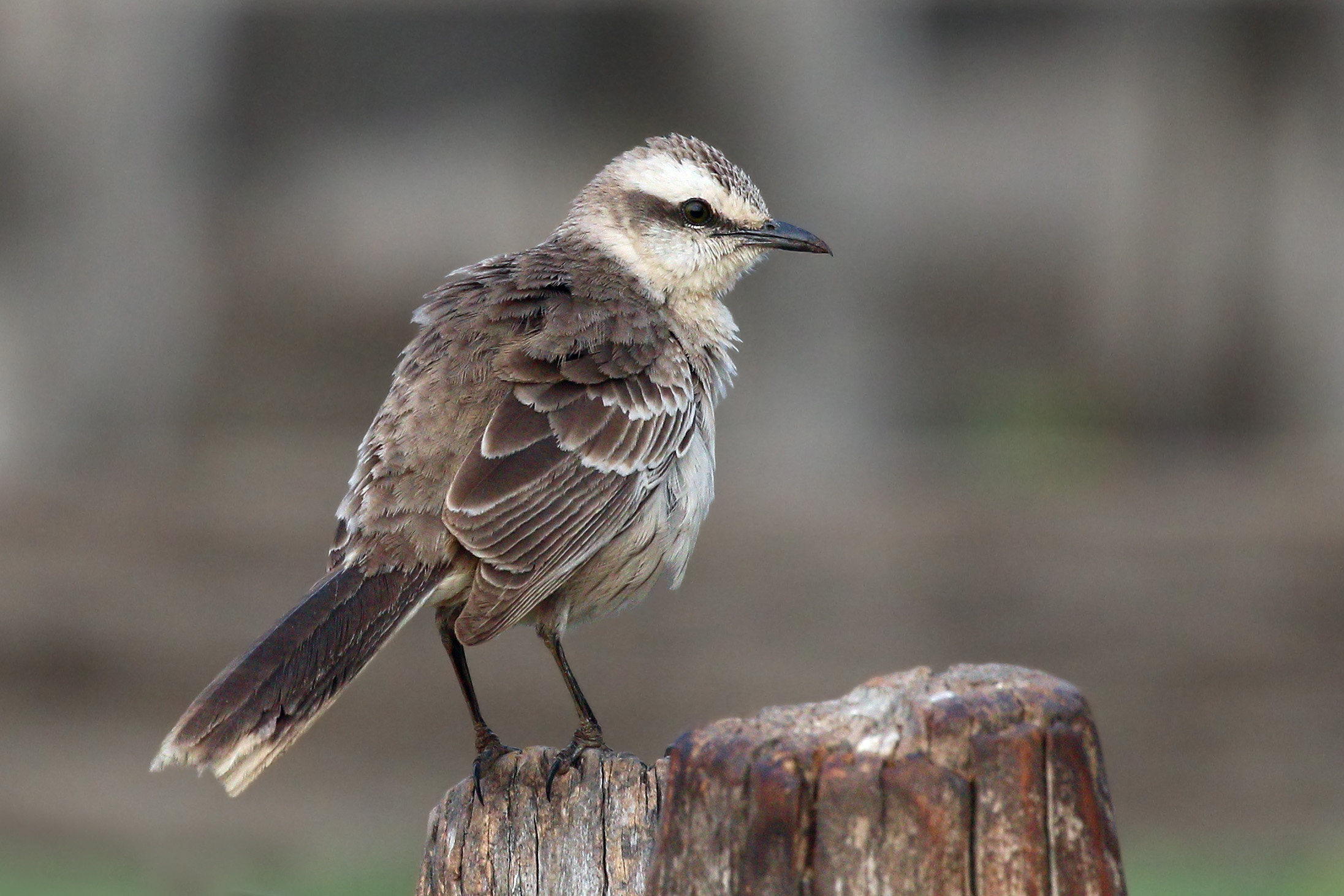
Chalk-browed mockingbird

Order: Passeriformes Family: Mimidae

The mimids are a family of passerine birds that includes thrashers, mockingbirds, tremblers, and the New World catbirds. These birds are notable for their vocalizations, especially their ability to mimic a wide variety of birds and other sounds heard outdoors. Their coloring tends towards dull-grays and browns.

- Tropical mockingbird, Mimus gilvus
- Chalk-browed mockingbird, Mimus saturninus
- White-banded mockingbird, Mimus triurus

== Starlings ==
Order: Passeriformes Family: Sturnidae

Starlings are small to medium-sized passerine birds. Their flight is strong and direct and they are very gregarious. Their preferred habitat is fairly open country. They eat insects and fruit. Plumage is typically dark with a metallic sheen.

- European starling, Sturnus vulgaris (I)

== Estreldids ==
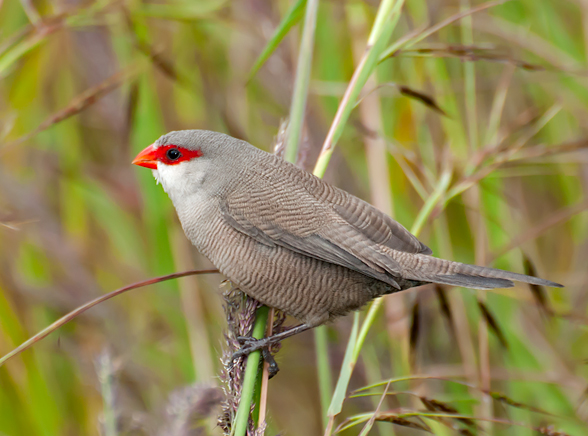
Common waxbill

Order: Passeriformes Family: Estrildidae

The estrildid finches are small passerine birds of the Old World tropics and Australasia. They are gregarious and often colonial seed eaters with short thick but pointed bills. They are all similar in structure and habits, but have wide variation in plumage colours and patterns.

- Common waxbill, Estrilda astrild (I)

== Old World sparrows ==
Order: Passeriformes Family: Passeridae

Old World sparrows are small passerine birds. In general, sparrows tend to be small, plump, brown or gray birds with short tails and short powerful beaks. Old World sparrow are seed eaters, but they also consume small insects.

- House sparrow, Passer domesticus (I)

== Pipits and wagtails ==
Order: Passeriformes Family: Motacillidae

Motacillidae is a family of small passerine birds with medium to long tails. They include the wagtails, longclaws and pipits. They are slender, ground feeding insectivores of open country.

- Yellowish pipit, Anthus chii
- Short-billed pipit, Anthus furcatus
- Correndera pipit, Anthus correndera
- Ochre-breasted pipit, Anthus nattereri (vulnerable)
- Hellmayr's pipit, Anthus hellmayri

== Finches ==
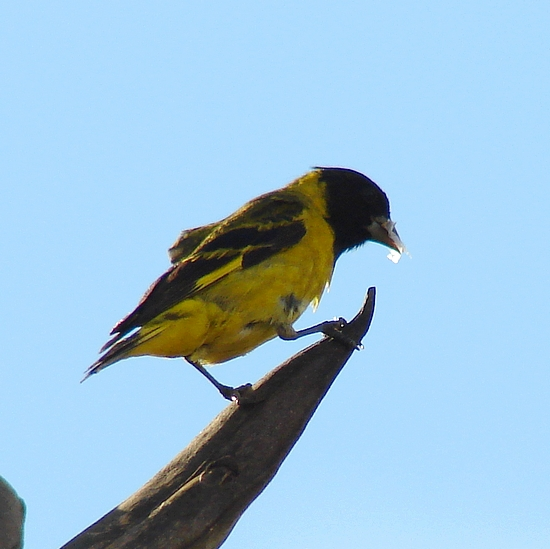
Hooded siskin

Order: Passeriformes Family: Fringillidae

Finches are seed-eating passerine birds, that are small to moderately large and have a strong beak, usually conical and in some species very large. All have twelve tail feathers and nine primaries. These birds have a bouncing flight with alternating bouts of flapping and gliding on closed wings, and most sing well.

- European greenfinch, Chloris chloris (U)
- European goldfinch, Carduelis carduelis (I)
- Yellow-faced siskin, Spinus yarrellii (E) (vulnerable)
- Hooded siskin, Spinus magellanicus
- Golden-rumped euphonia, Chlorophonia cyanocephala
- Blue-naped chlorophonia, Chlorophonia cyanea
- Plumbeous euphonia, Euphonia plumbea
- Purple-throated euphonia, Euphonia chlorotica
- Finsch's euphonia, Euphonia finschi
- Golden-bellied euphonia, Euphonia chrysopasta
- White-vented euphonia, Euphonia minuta
- Green-throated euphonia, Euphonia chalybea (near-threatened)
- Violaceous euphonia, Euphonia violacea
- Thick-billed euphonia, Euphonia laniirostris
- Orange-bellied euphonia, Euphonia xanthogaster
- Golden-sided euphonia, Euphonia cayennensis
- Rufous-bellied euphonia, Euphonia rufiventris
- Chestnut-bellied euphonia, Euphonia pectoralis

== Sparrows ==
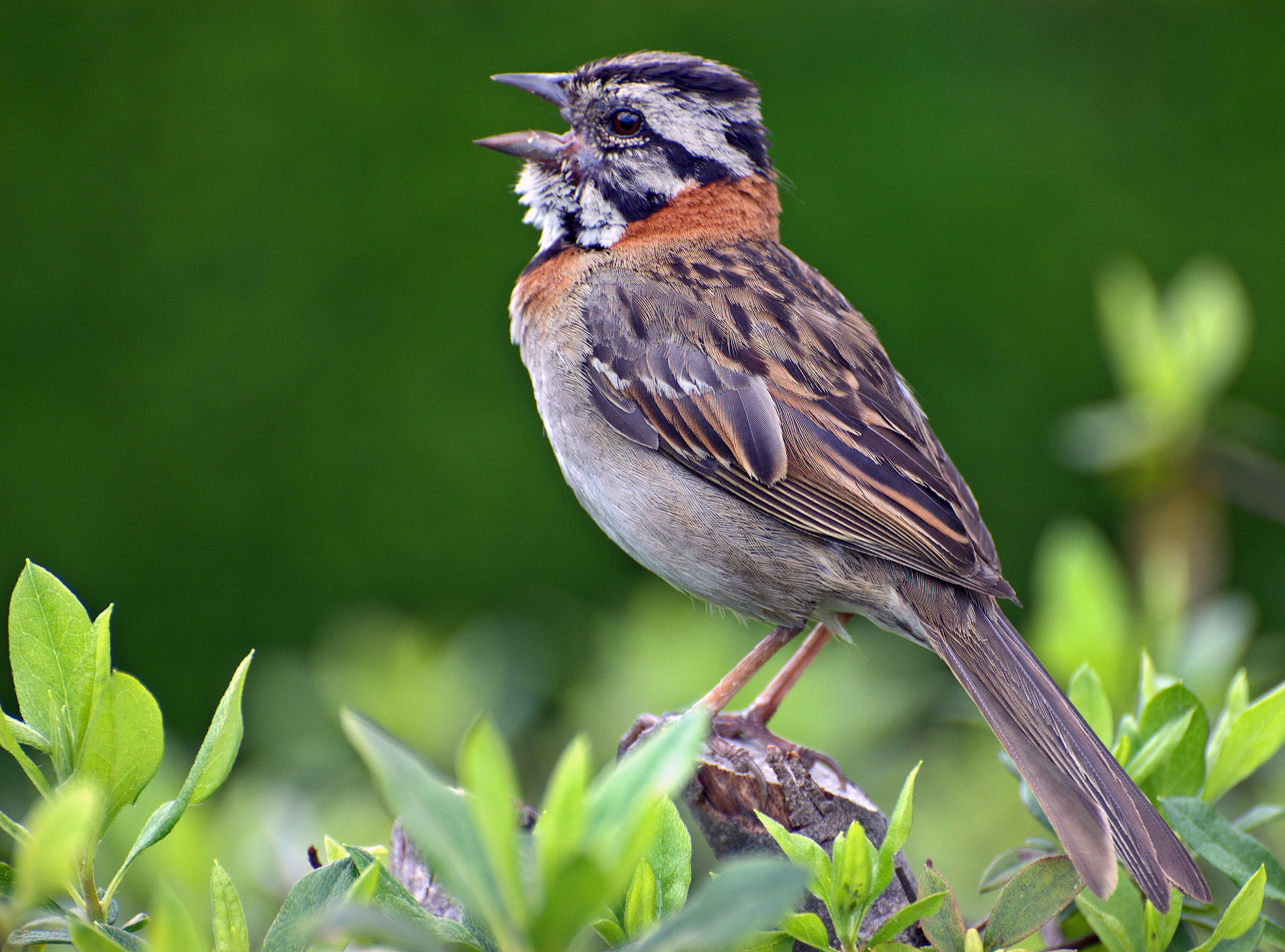
Rufous-collared sparrow

Order: Passeriformes Family: Passerellidae

Most of the species are known as sparrows, but these birds are not closely related to the Old World sparrows which are in the family Passeridae. Many of these have distinctive head patterns.

- Grassland sparrow, Ammodramus humeralis
- Yellow-browed sparrow, Ammodramus aurifrons
- Black-striped sparrow, Arremonops conirostris
- Pectoral sparrow, Arremon taciturnus
- São Francisco sparrow, Arremon franciscanus (E)
- Half-collared sparrow, Arremon semitorquatus (E)
- Saffron-billed sparrow, Arremon flavirostris
- Rufous-collared sparrow, Zonotrichia capensis
- Tepui brushfinch, Atlapetes personatus

== Blackbirds ==
Order: Passeriformes Family: Icteridae

The icterids are a group of small to medium-sized, often colorful, passerine birds restricted to the New World and include the grackles, New World blackbirds and New World orioles. Most species have black as the predominant plumage color, often enlivened by yellow, orange, or red.

- Bobolink, Dolichonyx oryzivorus
- Eastern meadowlark, Sturnella magna
- Red-breasted meadowlark, Leistes militaris
- White-browed meadowlark, Leistes superciliaris
- Pampas meadowlark, Leistes defilippii (extirpated) (vulnerable)
- Russet-backed oropendola, Psarocolius angustifrons
- Green oropendola, Psarocolius viridis
- Crested oropendola, Psarocolius decumanus
- Olive oropendola, Psarocolius bifasciatus
- Solitary black cacique, Cacicus solitarius
- Golden-winged cacique, Cacicus chrysopterus
- Selva cacique, Cacicus koepckeae
- Yellow-rumped cacique, Cacicus cela
- Band-tailed cacique, Cacicus latirostris
- Red-rumped cacique, Cacicus haemorrhous
- Casqued cacique, Cacicus oseryi
- Orange-backed troupial, Icterus croconotus
- Campo troupial, Icterus jamacaii (E)
- Epaulet oriole, Icterus cayanensis
- Variable oriole, Icterus pyrrhopterus
- Baltimore oriole, Icterus galbula (V)
- Yellow oriole, Icterus nigrogularis
- Screaming cowbird, Molothrus rufoaxillaris
- Giant cowbird, Molothrus oryzivorus
- Shiny cowbird, Molothrus bonariensis
- Carib grackle, Quiscalus lugubris
- Velvet-fronted grackle, Lampropsar tanagrinus
- Oriole blackbird, Gymnomystax mexicanus
- Golden-tufted grackle, Macroagelaius imthurni
- Scarlet-headed blackbird, Amblyramphus holosericeus
- Forbes's blackbird, Anumara forbesi (E) (endangered)
- Chopi blackbird, Gnorimopsar chopi
- Grayish baywing, Agelaioides badius
- Pale baywing, Agelaioides fringillarius (E)
- Unicolored blackbird, Agelasticus cyanopus
- Yellow-winged blackbird, Agelasticus thilius
- Chestnut-capped blackbird, Chrysomus ruficapillus
- Yellow-hooded blackbird, Chrysomus icterocephalus
- Saffron-cowled blackbird, Xanthopsar flavus (vulnerable)
- Yellow-rumped marshbird, Pseudoleistes guirahuro
- Brown-and-yellow marshbird, Pseudoleistes virescens
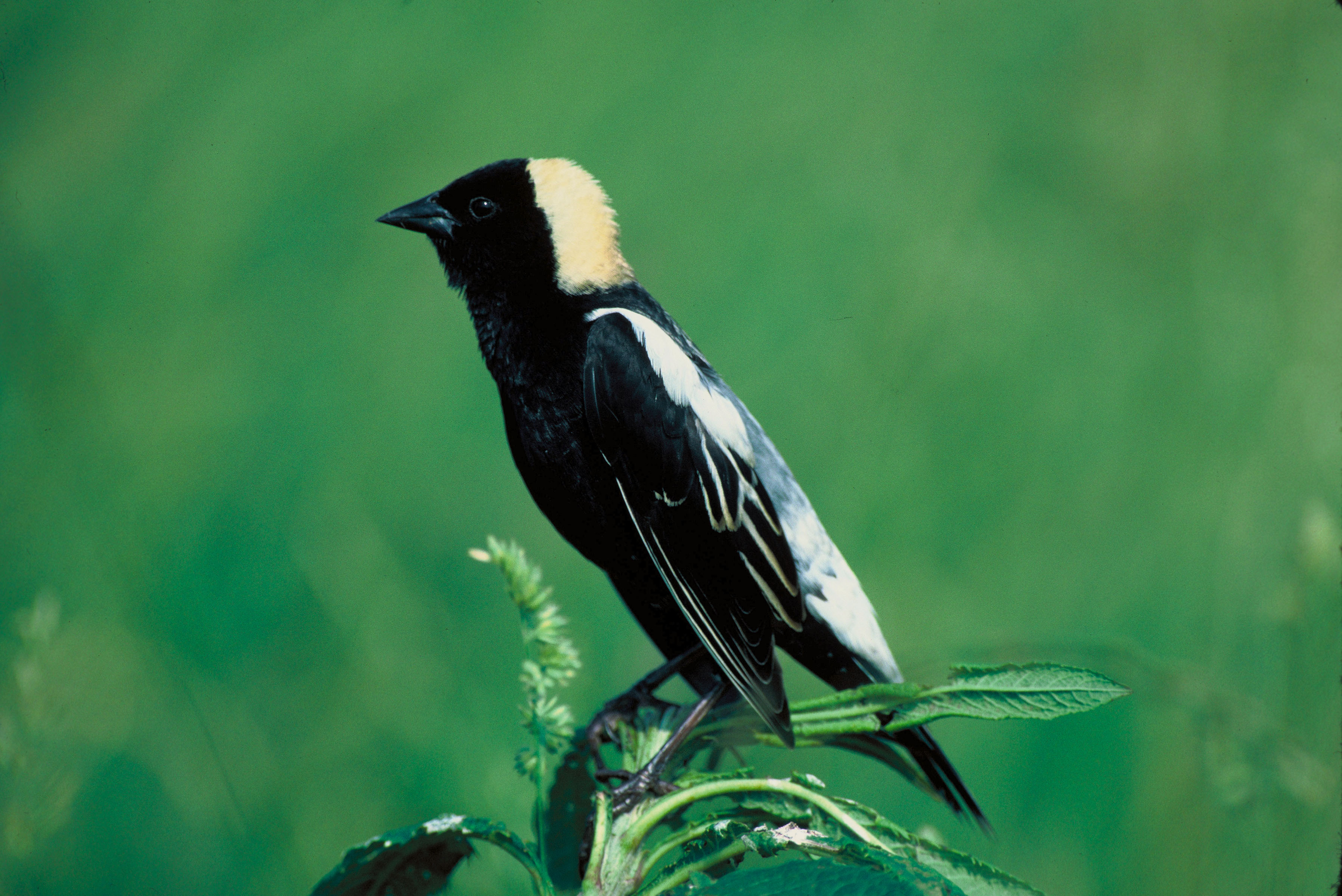
Bobolink

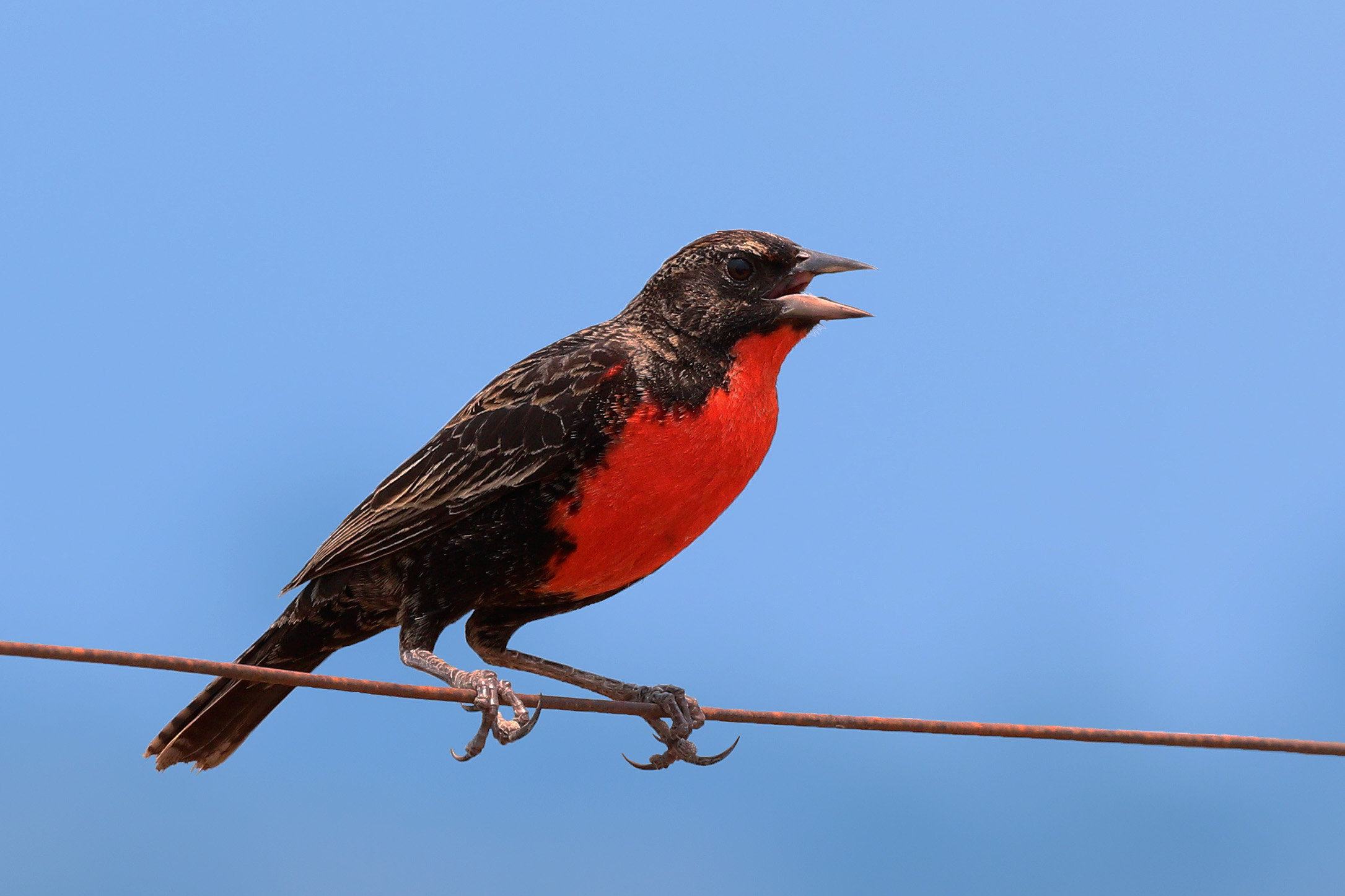
White-browed meadowlark

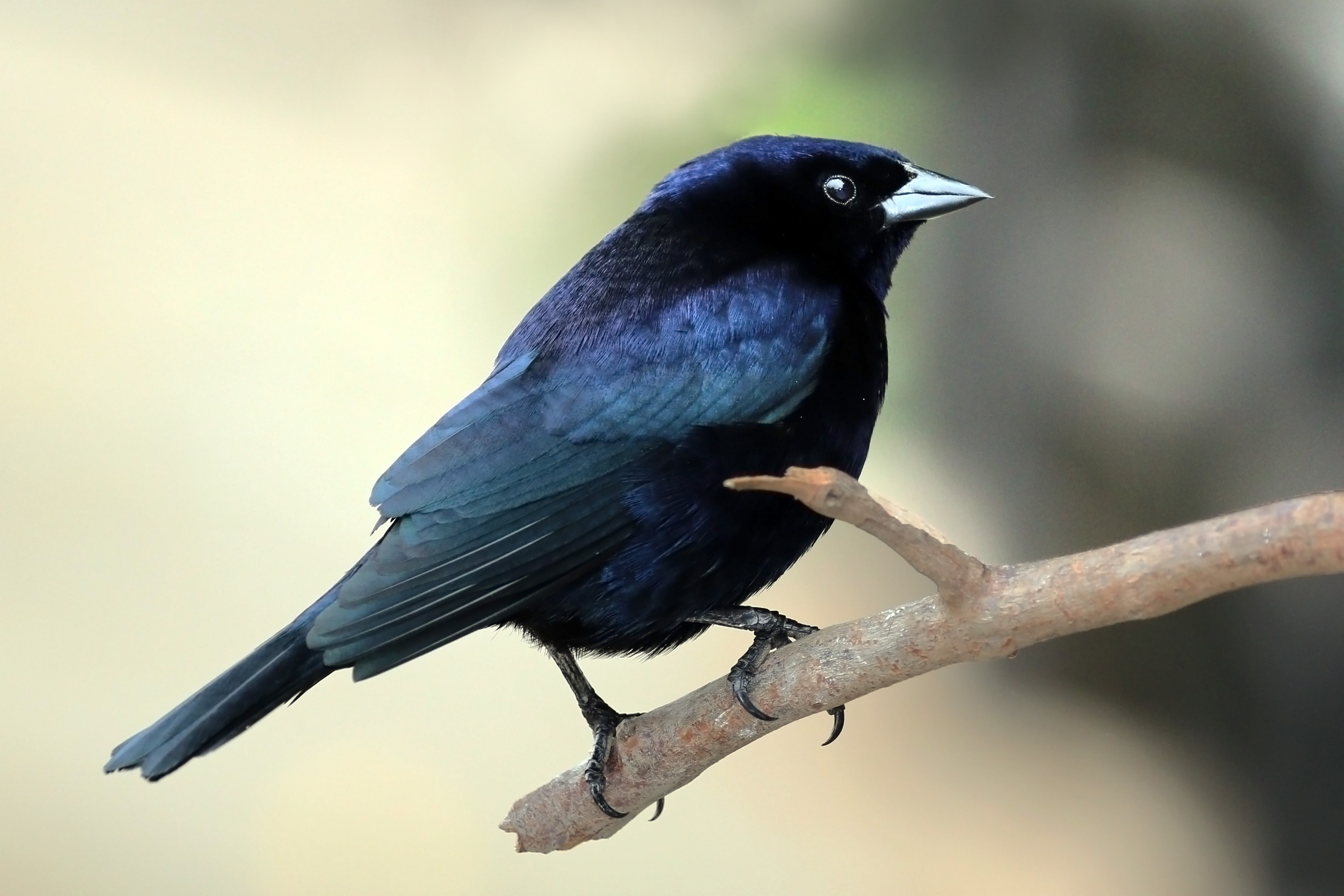
Shiny cowbird

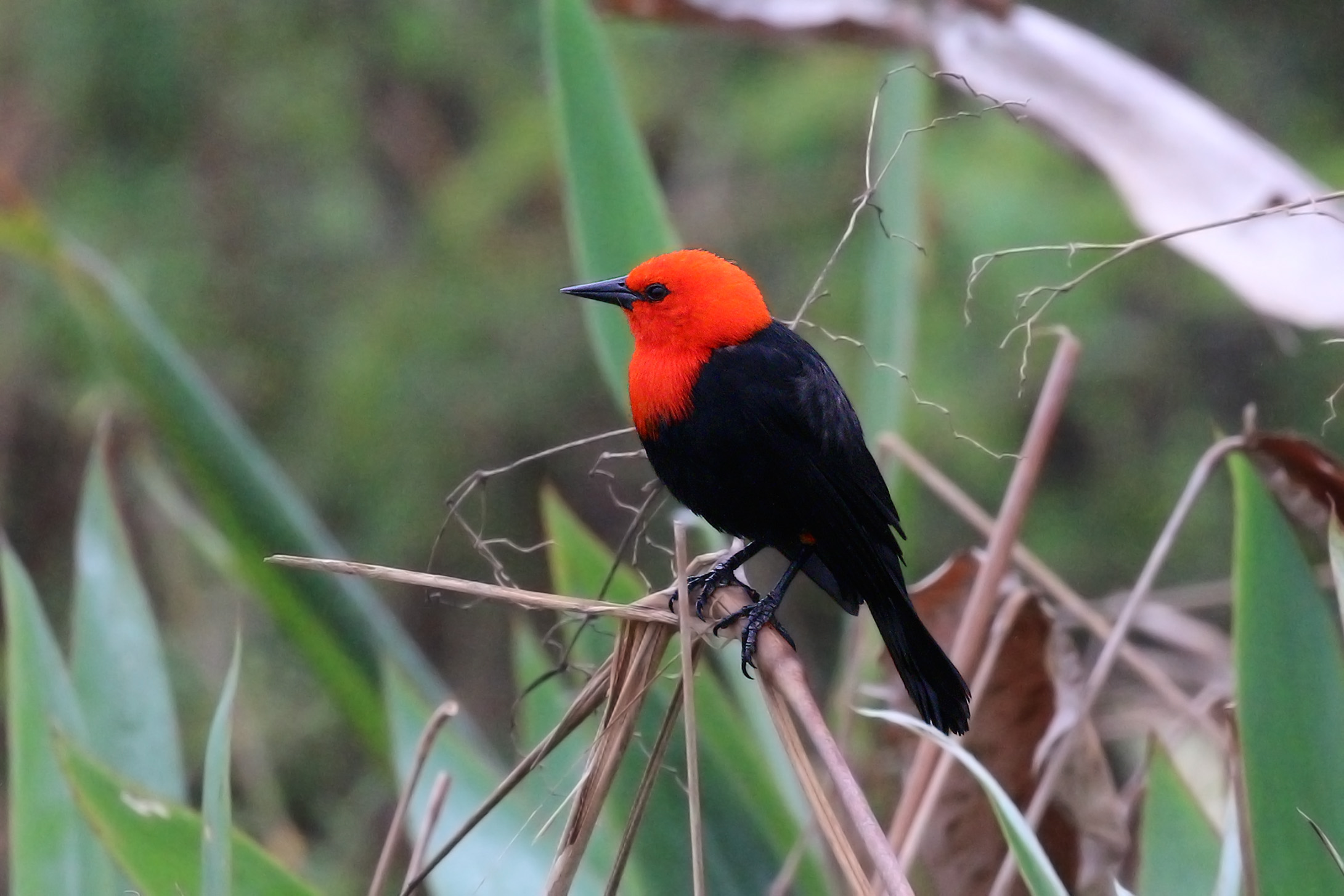
Scarlet-headed blackbird

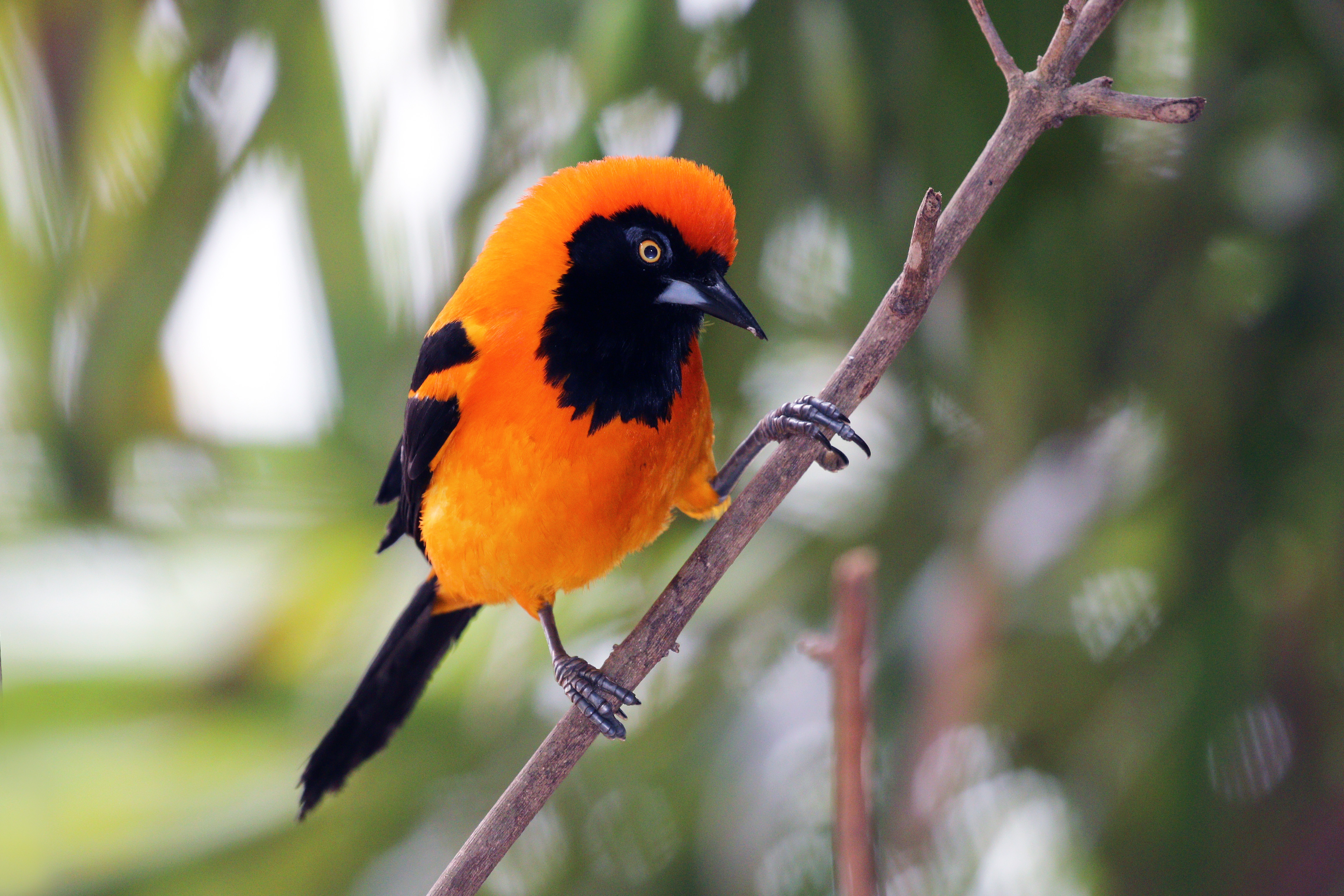
Orange-backed troupial

== Wood-warblers ==
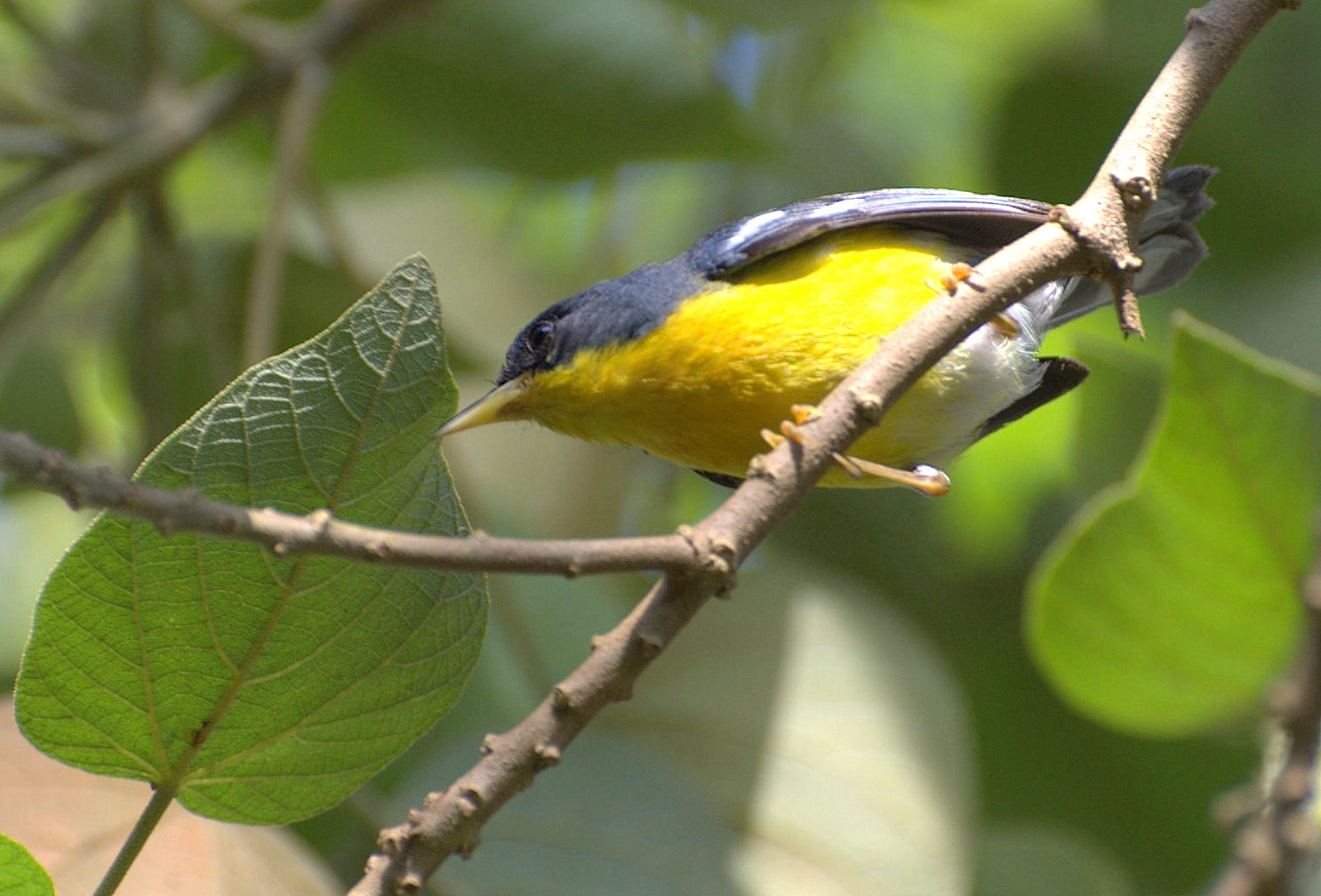
Tropical parula

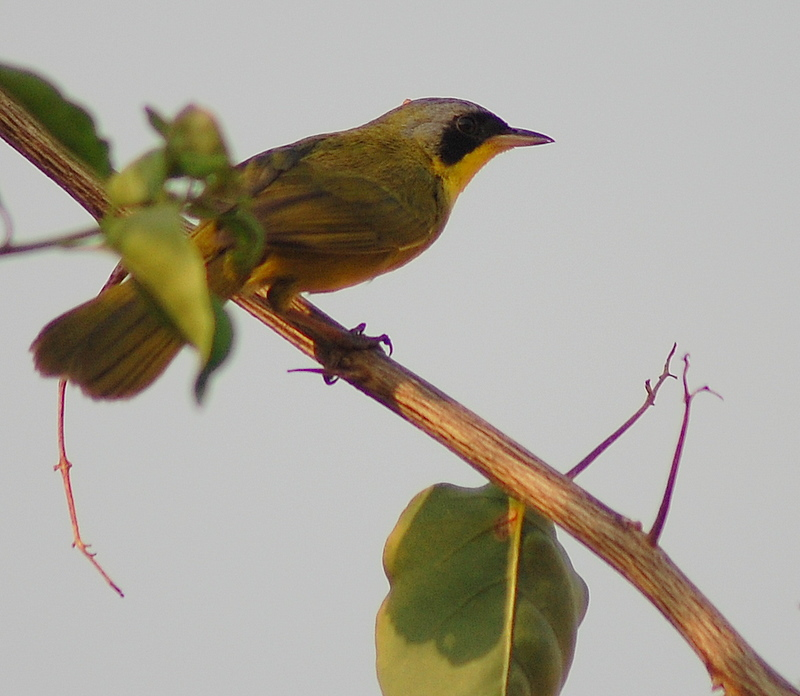
Masked yellowthroat

Order: Passeriformes Family: Parulidae

The wood-warblers are a group of small, often colorful, passerine birds restricted to the New World. Most are arboreal, but some are terrestrial. Most members of this family are insectivores.

- Northern waterthrush, Parkesia noveboracensis (V)
- Louisiana waterthrush, Parkesia motacilla (V)
- Black-and-white warbler, Mniotilta varia (V)
- Prothonotary warbler, Protonotaria citrea (U)
- Tennessee warbler, Leiothlypis peregrina (V)
- Connecticut warbler, Oporornis agilis (V)
- Masked yellowthroat, Geothlypis aequinoctialis
- American redstart, Setophaga ruticilla (V)
- Cerulean warbler, Setophaga cerulea (V)
- Tropical parula, Setophaga pitiayumi
- Blackburnian warbler, Setophaga fusca
- Yellow warbler, Setophaga petechia
- Blackpoll warbler, Setophaga striata
- Black-throated green warbler, Setophaga virens (V)
- White-striped warbler, Myiothlypis leucophrys (E)
- Flavescent warbler, Myiothlypis flaveolus
- White-browed warbler, Myiothlypis leucoblephara
- Buff-rumped warbler, Myiothlypis fulvicauda
- Riverbank warbler, Myiothlypis rivularis
- Two-banded warbler, Myiothlypis bivittatus
- Golden-crowned warbler, Basileuterus culicivorus
- Canada warbler, Cardellina canadensis (U)
- Slate-throated whitestart, Myioborus miniatus
- Tepui whitestart, Myioborus castaneocapillus

== Mitrospingids ==
Order: Passeriformes Family: Mitrospingidae

Until 2017 the four species in this family were included in the family Thraupidae, the "true" tanagers.

- Olive-backed tanager, Mitrospingus oleagineus
- Red-billed pied tanager, Lamprospiza melanoleuca
- Olive-green tanager, Orthogonys chloricterus (E)

== Cardinal grosbeaks ==
Order: Passeriformes Family: Cardinalidae

The cardinals are a family of robust, seed-eating birds with strong bills. They are typically associated with open woodland. The sexes usually have distinct plumages.

- Hepatic tanager, Piranga flava
- Summer tanager, Piranga rubra
- Scarlet tanager, Piranga olivacea
- White-winged tanager, Piranga leucoptera
- Red-crowned ant-tanager, Habia rubica
- Black-backed grosbeak, Pheucticus aureoventris
- Rose-breasted grosbeak, Pheucticus ludovicianus (V)
- Rose-breasted chat, Granatellus pelzelni
- Red-and-black grosbeak, Periporphyrus erythromelas
- Yellow-green grosbeak, Caryothraustes canadensis
- Blackish-blue seedeater, Amaurospiza moesta
- Glaucous-blue grosbeak, Cyanoloxia glaucocaerulea
- Amazonian grosbeak, Cyanoloxia rothschildii
- Ultramarine grosbeak, Cyanoloxia brissonii
- Dickcissel, Spiza americana (V)

== Tanagers ==
Order: Passeriformes Family: Thraupidae

The tanagers are a large group of small to medium-sized passerine birds restricted to the New World, mainly in the tropics. Many species are brightly colored. As a family they are omnivorous, but individual species specialize in eating fruits, seeds, insects, or other types of food. Most have short, rounded wings.

- Blue-backed tanager, Cyanicterus cyanicterus
- Hooded tanager, Nemosia pileata
- Cherry-throated tanager, Nemosia rourei (E) (critically endangered)
- Scarlet-throated tanager, Compsothraupis loricata (E)
- Brown tanager, Orchesticus abeillei (E) (near-threatened)
- Yellow-shouldered grosbeak, Parkerthraustes humeralis
- Green honeycreeper, Chlorophanes spiza
- Guira tanager, Hemithraupis guira
- Rufous-headed tanager, Hemithraupis ruficapilla (E)
- Yellow-backed tanager, Hemithraupis flavicollis
- Bicolored conebill, Conirostrum bicolor
- Pearly-breasted conebill, Conirostrum margaritae
- Chestnut-vented conebill, Conirostrum speciosum
- Stripe-tailed yellow-finch, Sicalis citrina
- Orange-fronted yellow-finch, Sicalis columbiana
- Saffron finch, Sicalis flaveola
- Grassland yellow-finch, Sicalis luteola
- Mourning sierra finch, Rhopospina fruticeti (V)
- Blue finch, Rhopospina caerulescens
- Paramo seedeater, Catamenia homochroa
- Scaled flowerpiercer, Diglossa duidae
- Greater flowerpiercer, Diglossa major
- Uniform finch, Haplospiza unicolor
- Blue-black grassquit, Volatinia jacarina
- Black-and-white tanager, Conothraupis speculigera (near-threatened)
- Cone-billed tanager, Conothraupis mesoleuca (E) (endangered)
- Flame-crested tanager, Loriotus cristatus
- Yellow-crested tanager, Loriotus rufiventer
- White-shouldered tanager, Loriotus luctuosus
- Fulvous-crested tanager, Tachyphonus surinamus
- Ruby-crowned tanager, Tachyphonus coronatus
- White-lined tanager, Tachyphonus rufus
- Red-shouldered tanager, Tachyphonus phoenicius
- Gray-headed tanager, Eucometis penicillata
- Black-goggled tanager, Trichothraupis melanops
- Pileated finch, Coryphospingus pileatus
- Red-crested finch, Coryphospingus cucullatus
- Masked crimson tanager, Ramphocelus nigrogularis
- Silver-beaked tanager, Ramphocelus carbo
- Brazilian tanager, Ramphocelus bresilius (E)
- Fulvous shrike-tanager, Lanio fulvus
- White-winged shrike-tanager, Lanio versicolor
- Coal-crested finch, Charitospiza eucosma (near-threatened)
- Short-billed honeycreeper, Cyanerpes nitidus
- Purple honeycreeper, Cyanerpes caeruleus
- Red-legged honeycreeper, Cyanerpes cyaneus
- Swallow tanager, Tersina viridis
- White-bellied dacnis, Dacnis albiventris
- Black-faced dacnis, Dacnis lineata
- Yellow-bellied dacnis, Dacnis flaviventer
- Black-legged dacnis, Dacnis nigripes (E) (near-threatened)
- Blue dacnis, Dacnis cayana
- Lesson's seedeater, Sporophila bouvronides
- Lined seedeater, Sporophila lineola
- White-bellied seedeater, Sporophila leucoptera
- Chestnut-bellied seedeater, Sporophila castaneiventris
- Ruddy-breasted seedeater, Sporophila minuta
- Black-and-tawny seedeater, Sporophila nigrorufa
- Copper seedeater, Sporophila bouvreuil
- Pearly-bellied seedeater, Sporophila pileata
- Tawny-bellied seedeater, Sporophila hypoxantha
- Ibera seedeater, Sporophila iberaensis
- Dark-throated seedeater, Sporophila ruficollis (near-threatened)
- Marsh seedeater, Sporophila palustris
- Rufous-rumped seedeater, Sporophila hypochroma (near-threatened)
- Chestnut seedeater, Sporophila cinnamomea
- Black-bellied seedeater, Sporophila melanogaster (E) (near-threatened)
- Chestnut-bellied seed-finch, Sporophila angolensis
- Great-billed seed-finch, Sporophila maximiliani
- Large-billed seed-finch, Sporophila crassirostris
- Gray seedeater, Sporophila intermedia
- Wing-barred seedeater, Sporophila americana
- White-naped seedeater, Sporophila fringilloides
- Black-and-white seedeater, Sporophila luctuosa (V)
- Yellow-bellied seedeater, Sporophila nigricollis
- Dubois's seedeater, Sporophila ardesiaca (E)
- Double-collared seedeater, Sporophila caerulescens
- Slate-colored seedeater, Sporophila schistacea
- Temminck's seedeater, Sporophila falcirostris (vulnerable)
- Buffy-fronted seedeater, Sporophila frontalis (E) (vulnerable)
- Plumbeous seedeater, Sporophila plumbea
- Tropeiro seedeater, Sporophila beltoni (E)
- Rusty-collared seedeater, Sporophila collaris
- White-throated seedeater, Sporophila albogularis (E)
- Many-colored chaco finch, Saltatricula multicolor (V)
- Black-throated saltator, Saltatricula atricollis
- Buff-throated saltator, Saltator maximus
- Olive-gray saltator, Saltator olivascens
- Bluish-gray saltator, Saltator coerulescens
- Green-winged saltator, Saltator similis
- Thick-billed saltator, Saltator maxillosus
- Golden-billed saltator, Saltator aurantiirostris
- Slate-colored grosbeak, Saltator grossus
- Black-throated grosbeak, Saltator fuliginosus
- Black-masked finch, Coryphaspiza melanotis (vulnerable)
- Great Pampa-finch, Embernagra platensis
- Pale-throated Pampa-finch, Embernagra longicauda (E)
- Wedge-tailed grass-finch, Emberizoides herbicola
- Lesser grass-finch, Emberizoides ypiranganus
- Bay-chested warbling finch, Castanozoster thoracicus (E)
- Black-and-rufous warbling finch, Poospiza nigrorufa
- Orange-headed tanager, Thlypopsis sordida
- Chestnut-headed tanager, Thlypopsis pyrrhocoma
- Buff-throated warbling finch, Microspingus lateralis (E)
- Gray-throated warbling finch, Microspingus cabanisi
- Black-capped warbling finch, Microspingus melanoleucus
- Cinereous warbling finch, Microspingus cinereus (E)
- White-rumped tanager, Cypsnagra hirundinacea
- Long-tailed reed finch, Donacospiza albifrons
- Bananaquit, Coereba flaveola
- Dull-colored grassquit, Asemospiza obscura
- Sooty grassquit, Asemospiza fuliginosa
- White-banded tanager, Neothraupis fasciata (near-threatened)
- Diuca finch, Diuca diuca (V)
- Yellow cardinal, Gubernatrix cristata (endangered)
- Red-crested cardinal, Paroaria coronata
- Red-cowled cardinal, Paroaria dominicana (E)
- Red-capped cardinal, Paroaria gularis
- Crimson-fronted cardinal, Paroaria baeri (E)
- Yellow-billed cardinal, Paroaria capitata
- Diademed tanager, Stephanophorus diadematus
- Black-faced tanager, Schistochlamys melanopis
- Cinnamon tanager, Schistochlamys ruficapillus (E)
- Magpie tanager, Cissopis leverianus
- Fawn-breasted tanager, Pipraeidea melanonota
- Blue-and-yellow tanager, Rauenia bonariensis
- Black-hooded tanager, Stilpnia whitelyi
- Black-backed tanager, Stilpnia peruviana (E) (vulnerable)
- Chestnut-backed tanager, Stilpnia preciosa
- Burnished-buff tanager, Stilpnia cayana
- Masked tanager, Stilpnia nigrocincta
- Blue-necked tanager, Stilpnia cyanicollis
- Turquoise tanager, Tangara mexicana
- Paradise tanager, Tangara chilensis
- Opal-rumped tanager, Tangara velia
- Opal-crowned tanager, Tangara callophrys
- Green-headed tanager, Tangara seledon
- Seven-colored tanager, Tangara fastuosa (E) (vulnerable)
- Red-necked tanager, Tangara cyanocephala (E)
- Brassy-breasted tanager, Tangara desmaresti (E)
- Gilt-edged tanager, Tangara cyanoventris (E)
- Bay-headed tanager, Tangara gyrola
- Green-and-gold tanager, Tangara schrankii
- Blue-gray tanager, Thraupis episcopus
- Sayaca tanager, Thraupis sayaca
- Azure-shouldered tanager, Thraupis cyanoptera (E) (near-threatened)
- Golden-chevroned tanager, Thraupis ornata (E)
- Palm tanager, Thraupis palmarum
- Dotted tanager, Ixothraupis varia
- Speckled tanager, Ixothraupis guttata
- Yellow-bellied tanager, Ixothraupis xanthogastra
- Spotted tanager, Ixothraupis punctata
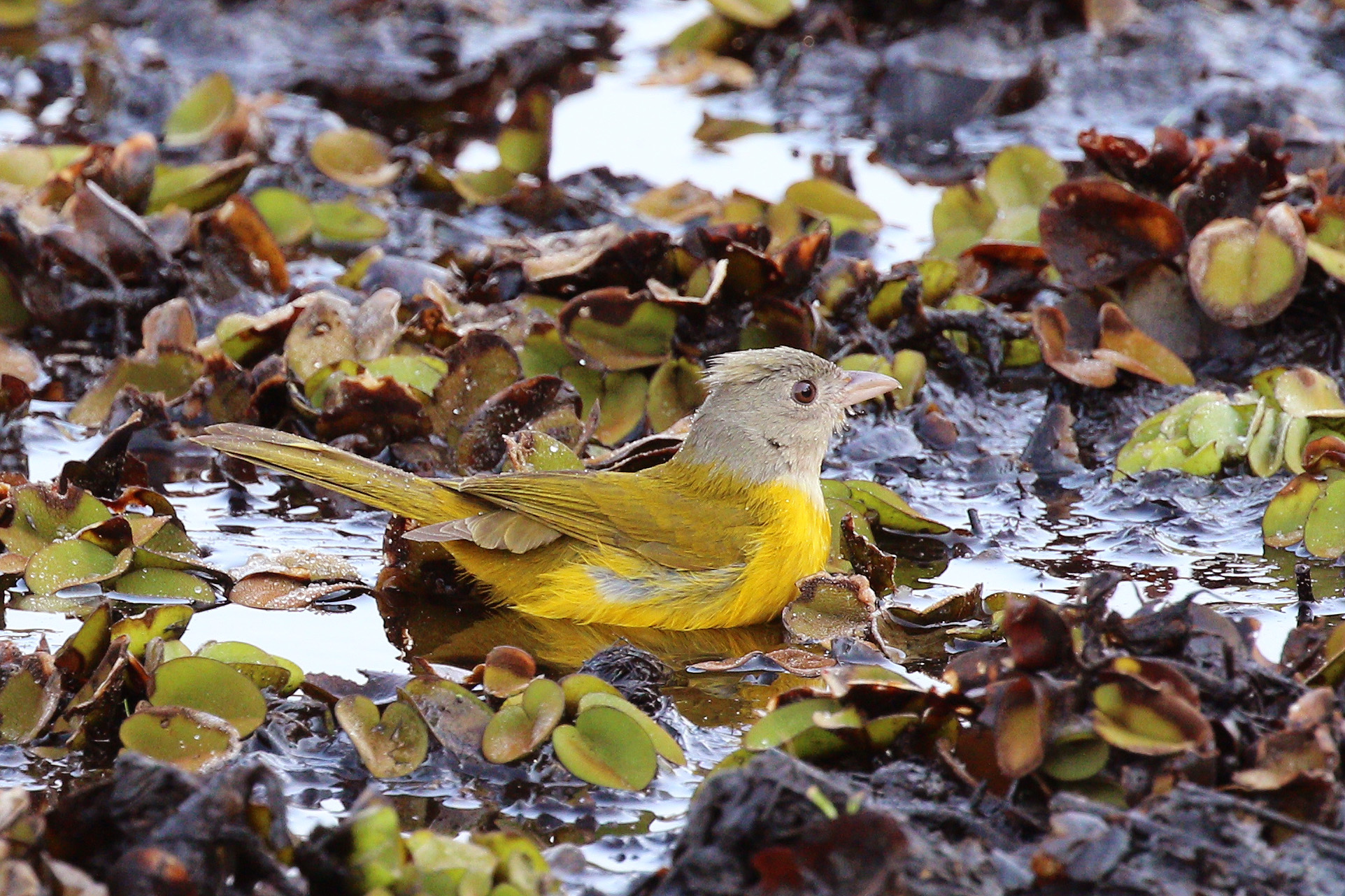
Gray-headed tanager

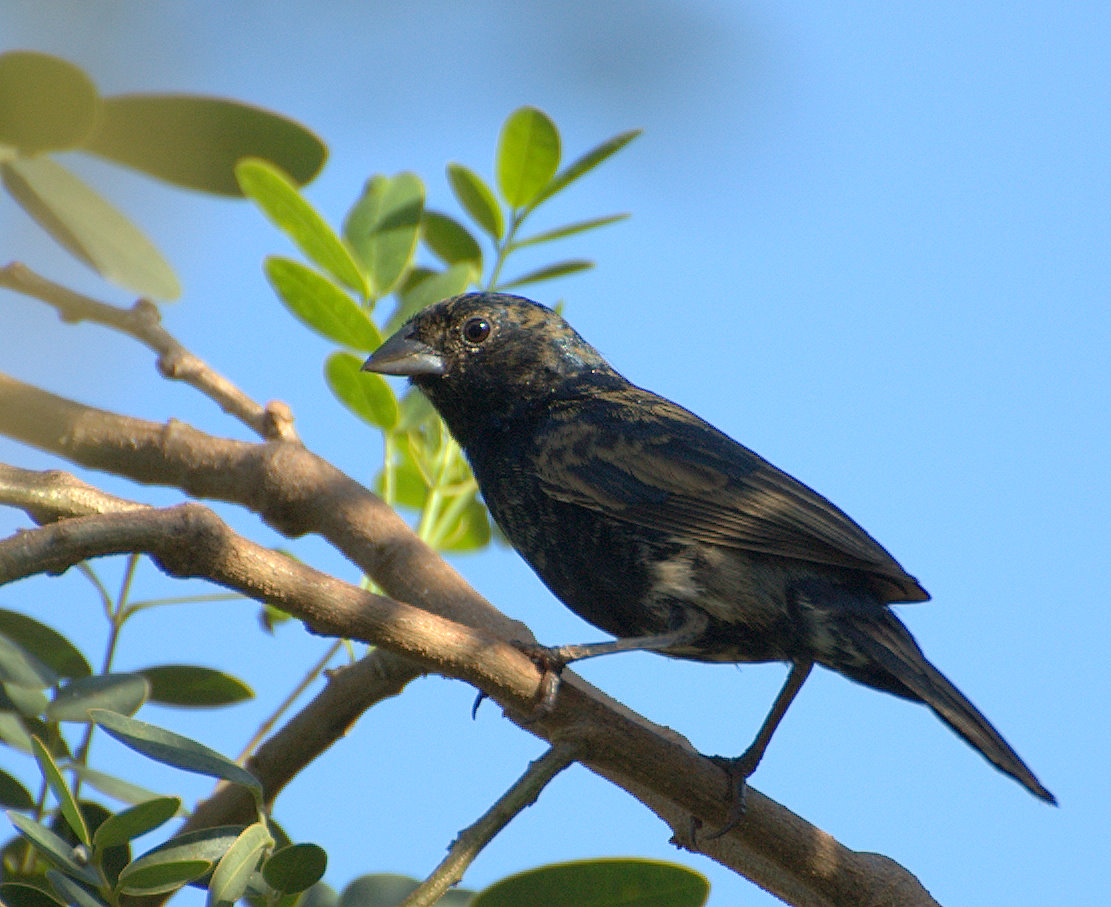
Blue-black grassquit

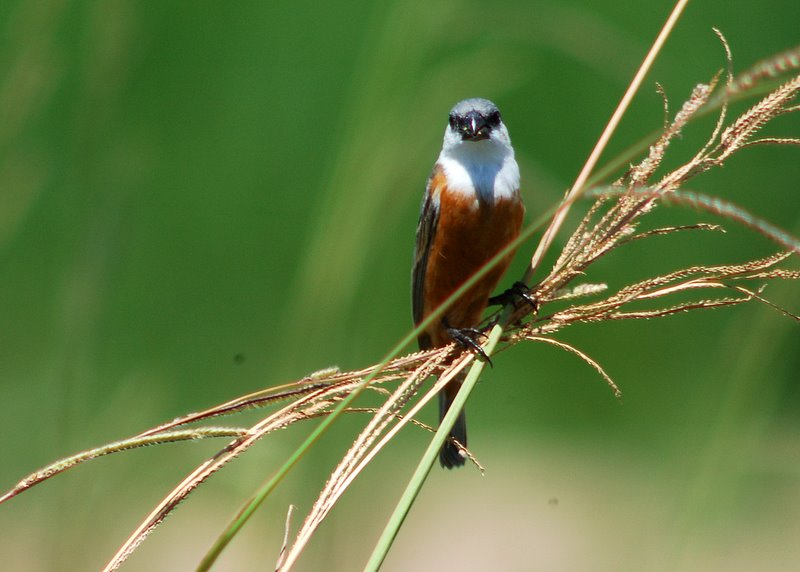
Double-collared seedeater

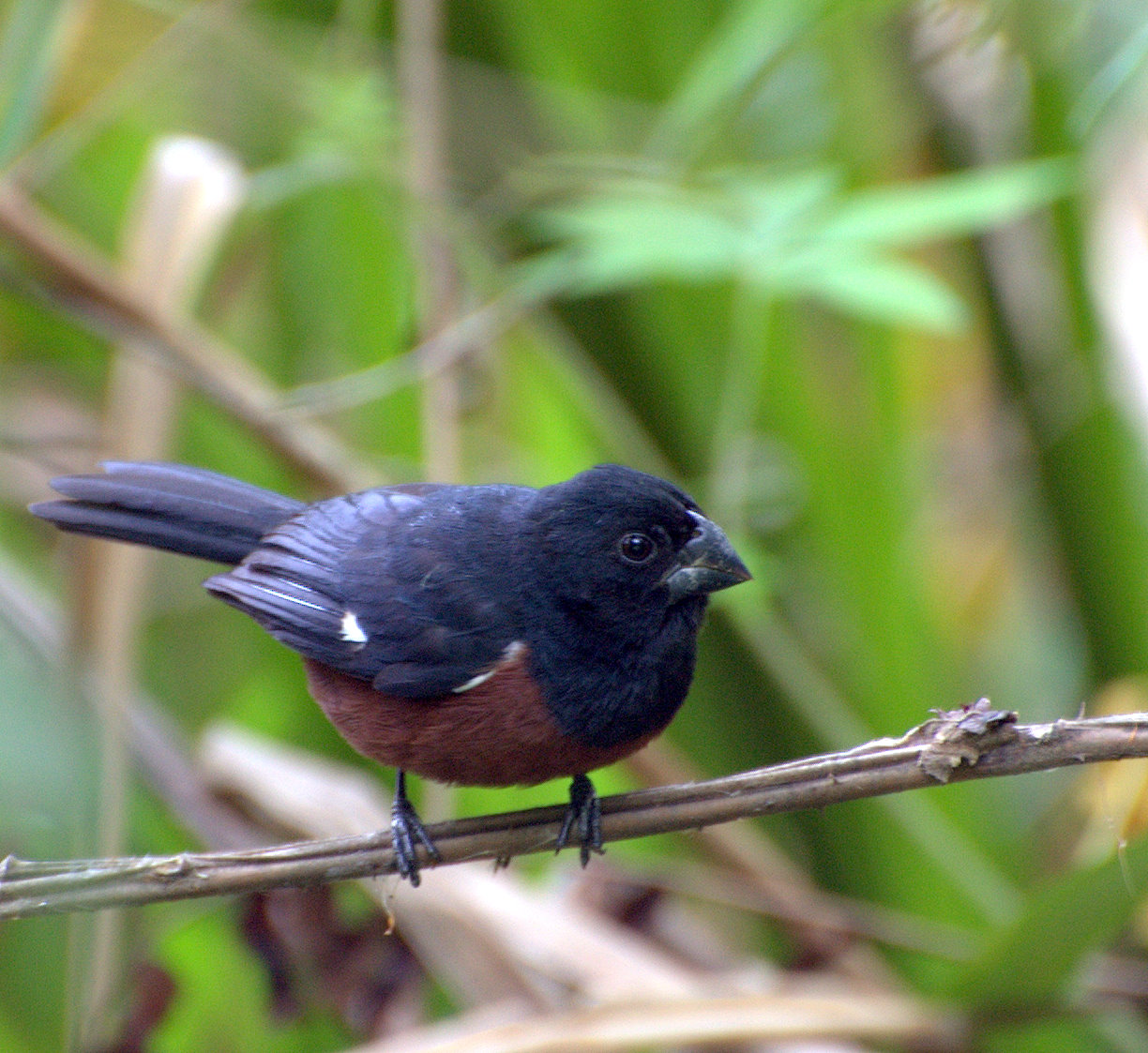
Chestnut-bellied seed-finch

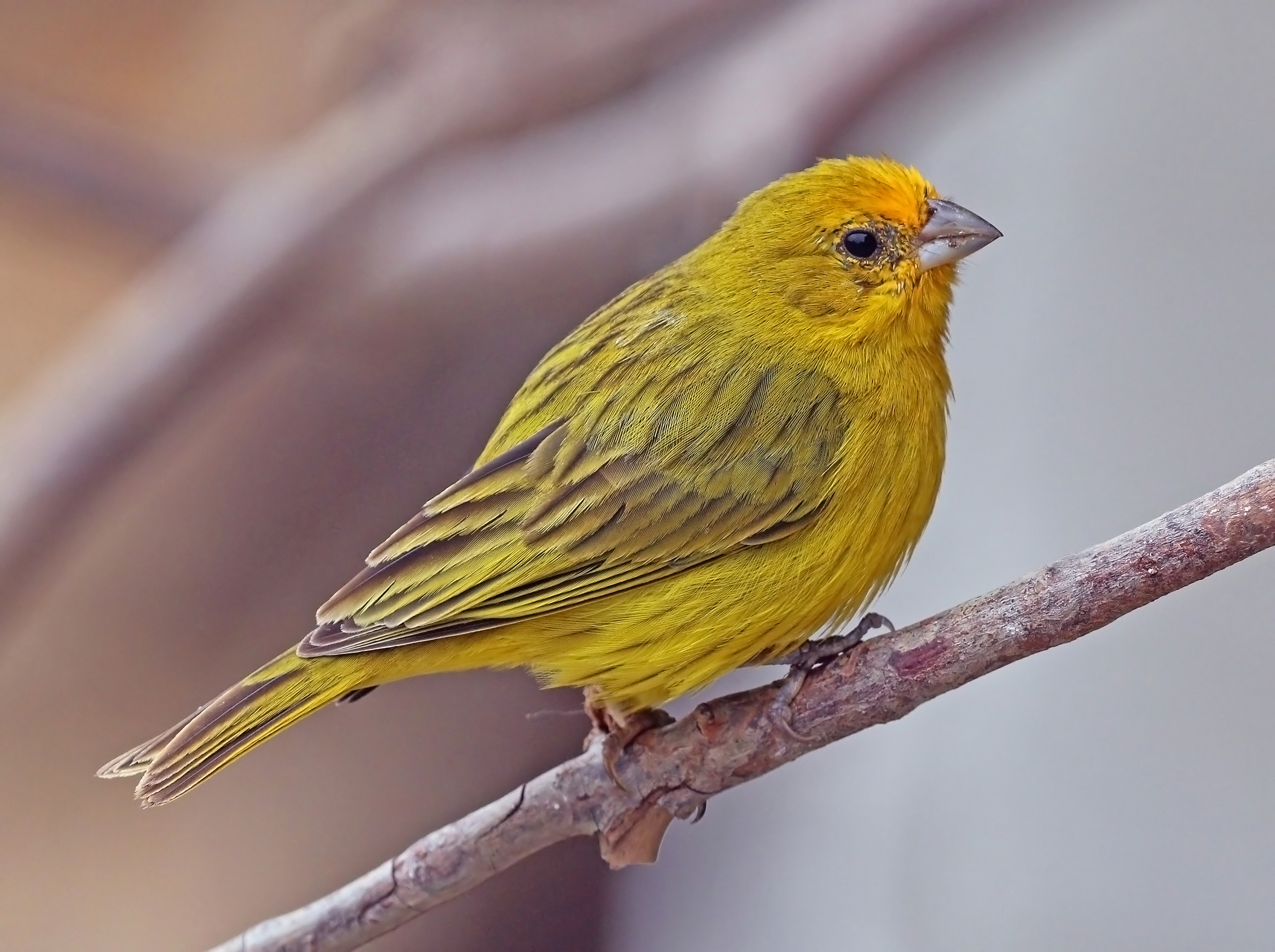
Saffron finch

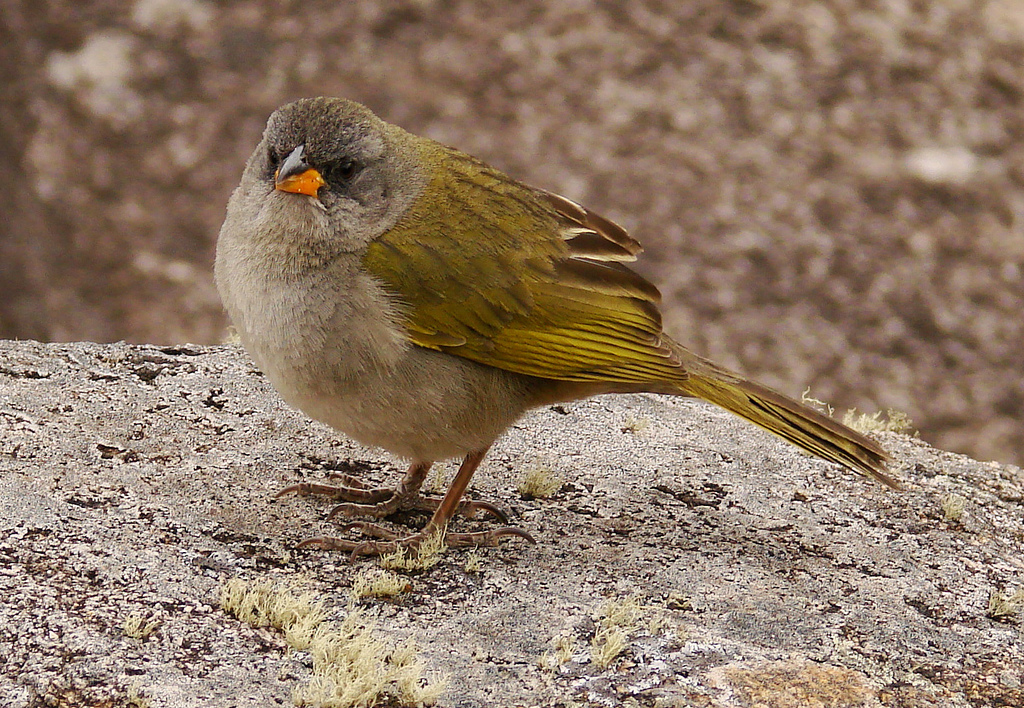
Great pampa finch

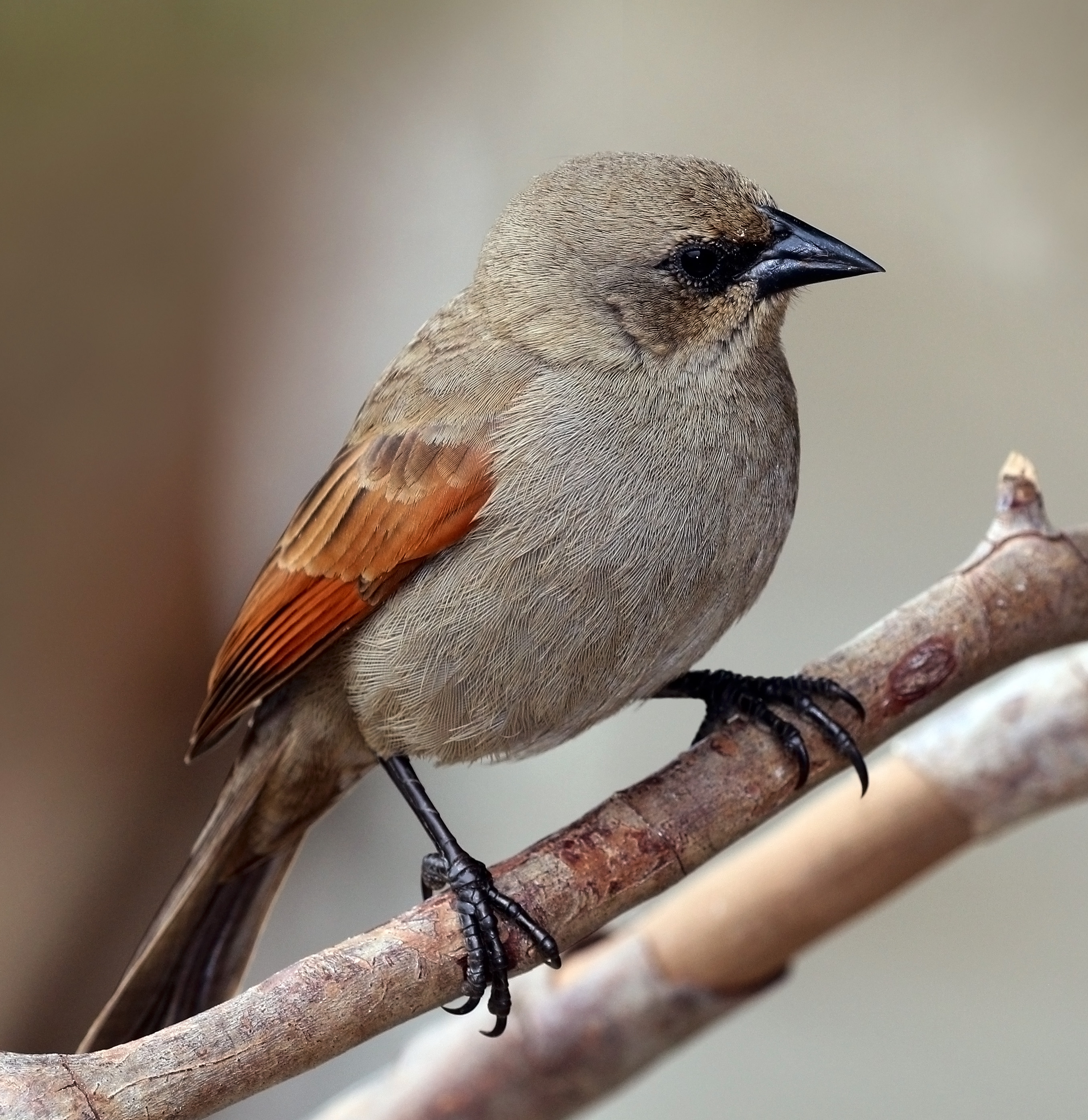
Plumbeous seedeater

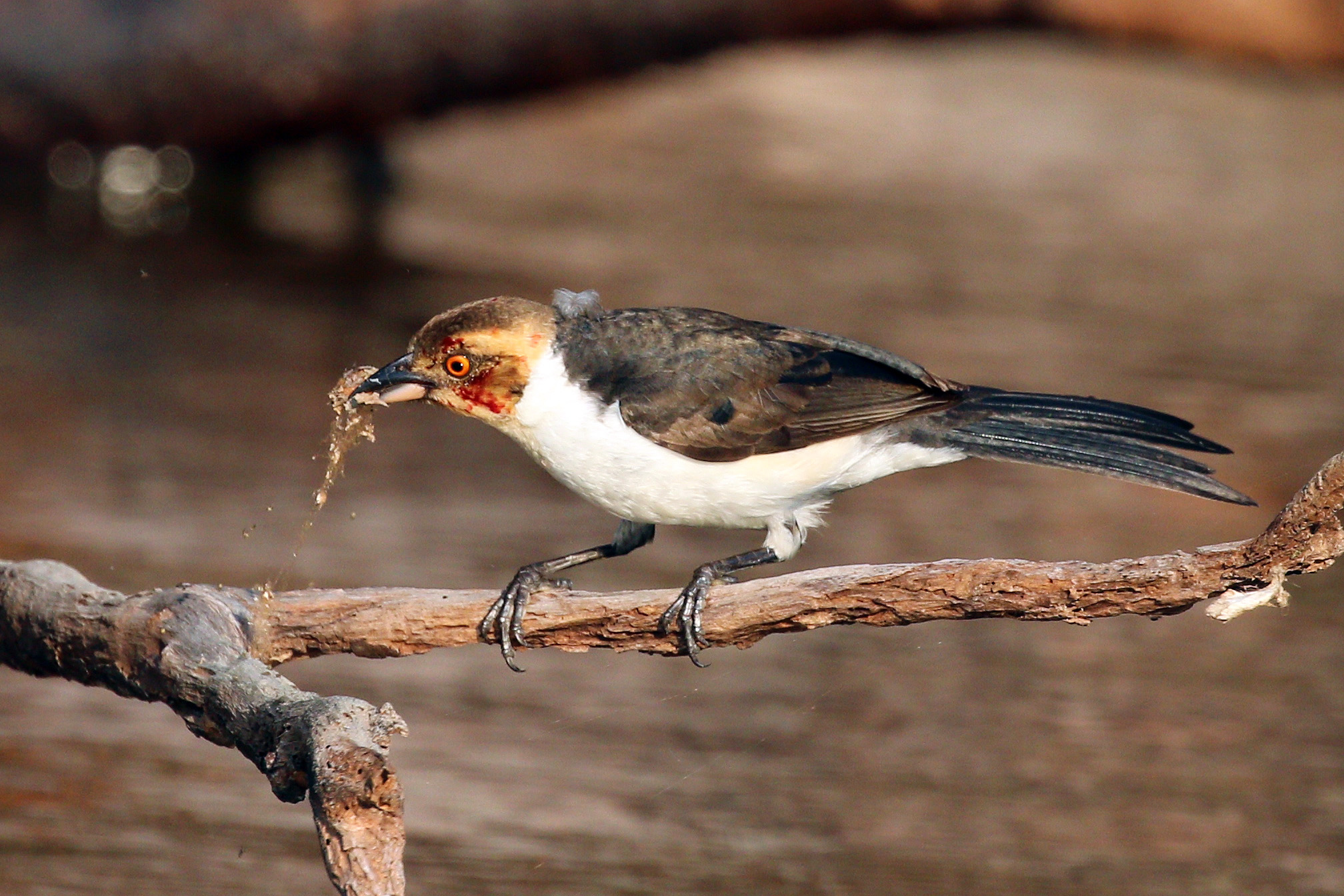
Red-capped cardinal

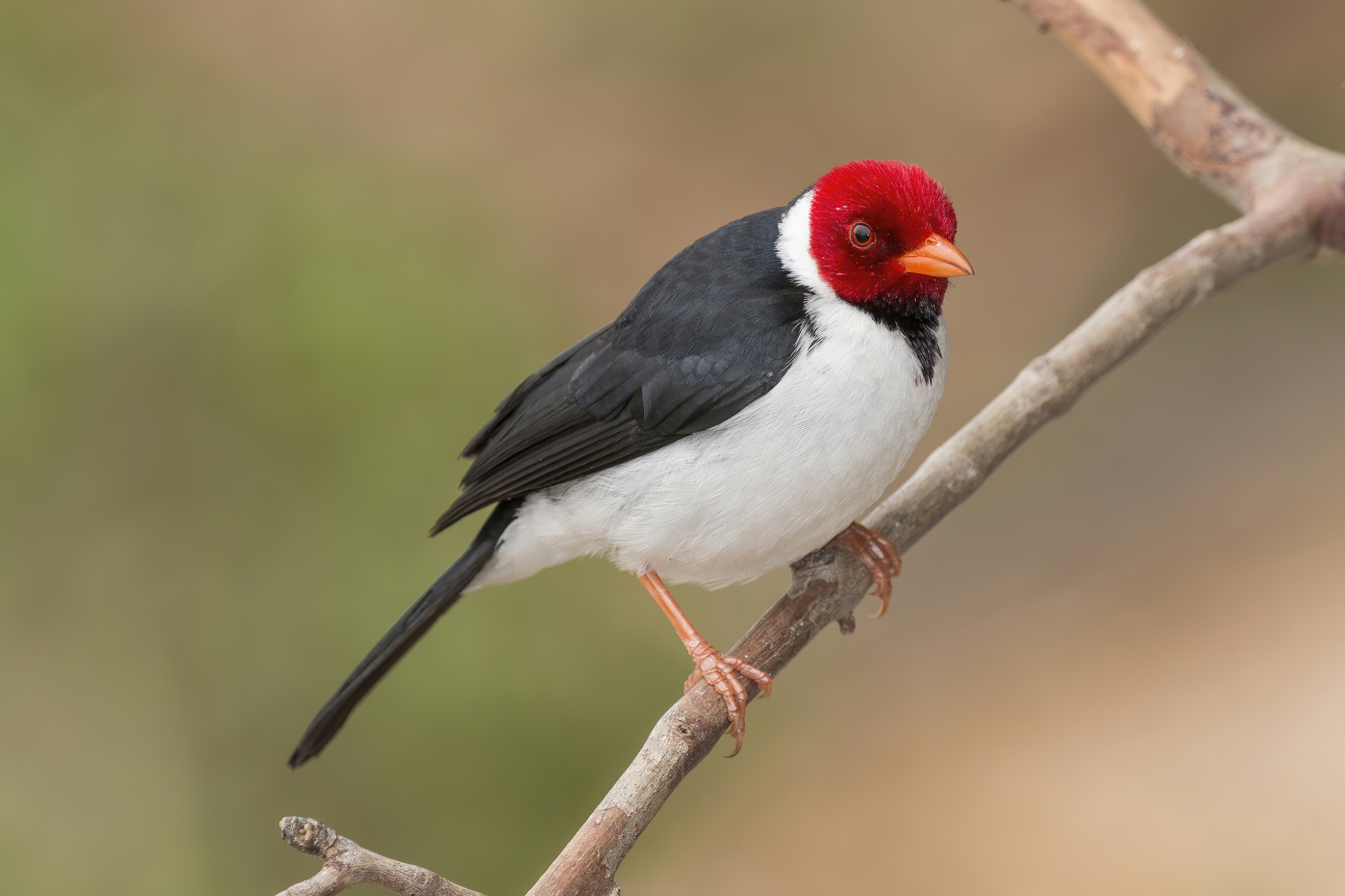
Yellow-billed cardinal

== See also ==
- Wildlife of Brazil
- Lists of birds by region
- List of amphibians of Brazil
- List of reptiles of Brazil
- List of mammals of Brazil
- List of macaws
- List of amazon parrots
- List of Aratinga parakeets
- WikiAves - website dedicated to the Brazilian community of birdwatchers
