= WikiAves =

Brazilian bird watching website

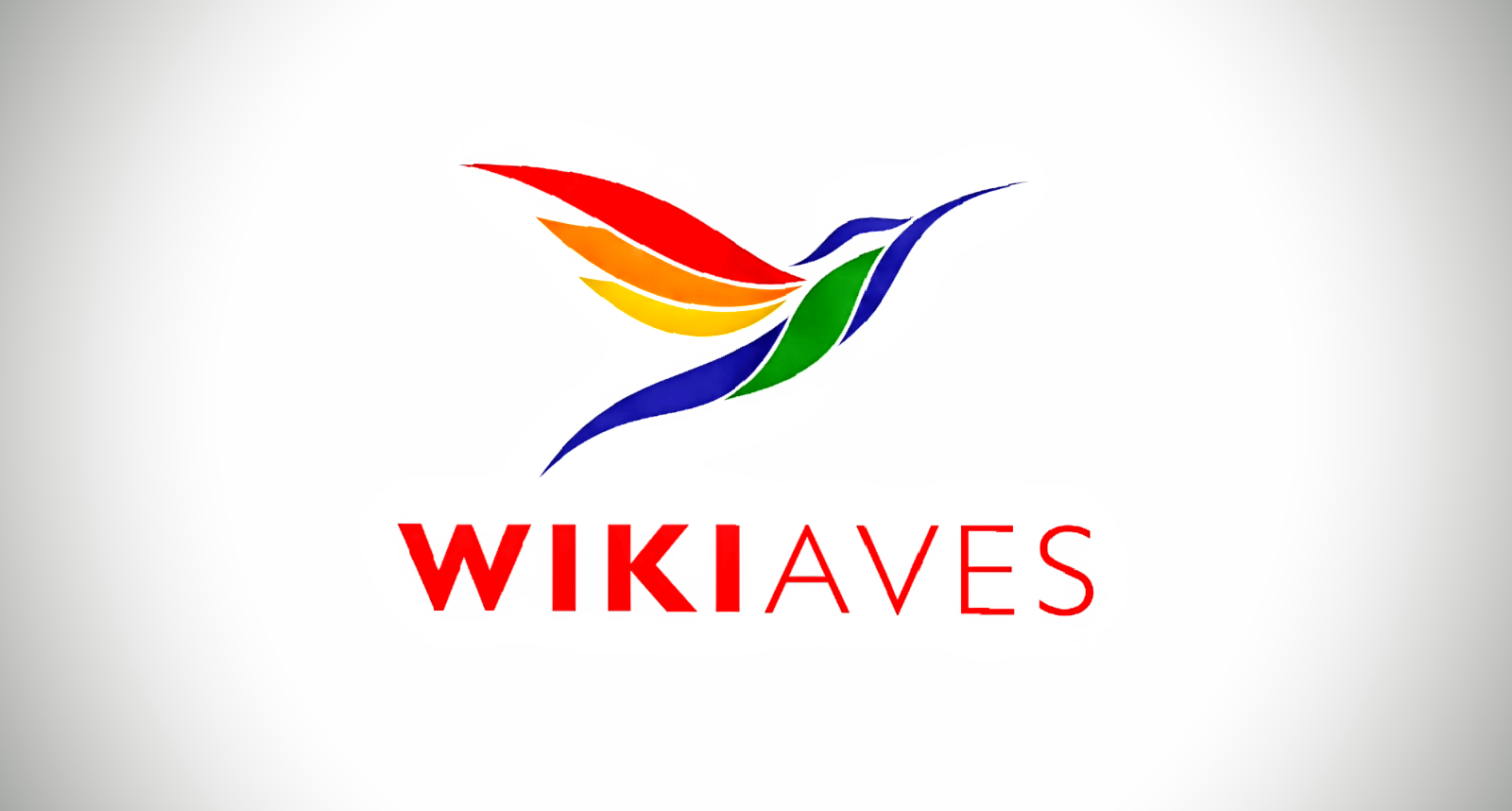
WikiAves Logo

WikiAves is a free Brazilian site of bird watchers and aims to support, publicize and promote the activity of bird watching, through photographic and sound records, species identification and communication between observers. On the site are registered photos and sounds of bird species that occur in Brazil.

The site was founded on December 16, 2008, and developed by Reinaldo Guedes. As of December 2018, there were over 2.4 million photos and 150,000 sound recordings of 1,880 different species, contributed by 30,000 users. Users contribute images and sound files, along with tentative identifications, and the community helps confirm the species photographed.

According to Fatbirder's Birding Website, WikiAves ranks first in online popularity of bird watching sites. According to the Commented List of birds of Brazil by the Brazilian Ornithological Registries Committee, 1919 bird species have been identified in Brazil. So 98.3% of bird species scientifically registered in Brazil have a WikiAves record.
