= List of Ornithogalum species =

The genus Ornithogalum contains about 180 species as of May 2012.

The genus Ornithogalum is within the tribe Ornithogaleae of the subfamily Scilloideae, in the family Asparagaceae of the order Asparagales.

== Species ==
- Ornithogalum abyssinicum Fresen.
- Ornithogalum adseptentrionesvergentulum U.Müll.-Doblies & D.Müll.-Doblies
- Ornithogalum aetfatense U.Müll.-Doblies & D.Müll.-Doblies
- Ornithogalum alatum Turrill
- Ornithogalum alpigenum Stapf
- Ornithogalum amblyocarpum Zahar.
- Ornithogalum amphibolum Zahar.
- Ornithogalum anamurense Speta
- Ornithogalum anatolicum Zahar.
- Ornithogalum anguinum F.M.Leight. ex Oberm.
- Ornithogalum annae-ameliae U.Müll.-Doblies & D.Müll.-Doblies
- Ornithogalum apiculatum Zahar.
- Ornithogalum arabicum L. – Star-of-Bethlehem
- Ornithogalum arcuatum Steven
- Ornithogalum arianum Lipsky in B.A.Fedtschenko & al.
- Ornithogalum armeniacum Baker
- Ornithogalum atticum Boiss. & Heldr.
- Ornithogalum baeticum Boiss.
- Ornithogalum balansae Boiss.
- Ornithogalum baurii Baker in W.H.Harvey & auct. suc. (eds.)
- Ornithogalum benguellense Baker
- Ornithogalum bicornutum F.M.Leight.
- Ornithogalum boucheanum (Kunth) Asch.
- Ornithogalum bourgaeanum Jord. & Fourr.
- Ornithogalum britteniae F.M.Leight. ex Oberm.
- Ornithogalum broteroi M.Laínz
- Ornithogalum bungei Boiss.
- Ornithogalum campanulatum U.Müll.-Doblies & D.Müll.-Doblies
- Ornithogalum candicans (Baker) J.C.Manning & Goldblatt (syn. Galtonia candicans) – Summer Hyacinth, Cape Hyacinth
- Ornithogalum capillaris J.M.Wood & M.S.Evans
- Ornithogalum cernuum Baker in D.Oliver & auct. suc. (eds.)
- Ornithogalum chetikianum Uysal
- Ornithogalum chionophilum Holmboe
- Ornithogalum ciliiferum U.Müll.-Doblies & D.Müll.-Doblies
- Ornithogalum collinum Guss.
- Ornithogalum comosum L.
- Ornithogalum concinnum Salisb.
- Ornithogalum conicum Jacq.
- Ornithogalum constrictum F.M.Leight.
- Ornithogalum convallarioides H.Perrier
- Ornithogalum corsicum Jord. & Fourr.
- Ornithogalum corticatum Mart.-Azorín
- Ornithogalum creticum Zahar.
- Ornithogalum cuspidatum Bertol.
- Ornithogalum decus-montium G.Will.
- Ornithogalum deltoideum Baker
- Ornithogalum demirizianum H.Malyer & Koyuncu
- Ornithogalum diphyllum Baker
- Ornithogalum divergens Boreau
- Ornithogalum dolichopharynx U.Müll.-Doblies & D.Müll.-Doblies
- Ornithogalum dregeanum Kunth
- Ornithogalum dubium Houtt. – Sun Star
- Ornithogalum esterhuyseniae Oberm.
- Ornithogalum euxinum Speta
- Ornithogalum exaratum Zahar.
- Ornithogalum exscapum Ten.
- Ornithogalum falcatum (G.J.Lewis) J.C.Manning & Goldblatt
- Ornithogalum filicaule J.C.Manning & Goldblatt
- Ornithogalum fimbriatum Willd.
- Ornithogalum fimbrimarginatum F.M.Leight.
- Ornithogalum fischerianum Krasch. in V.L.Komarov (ed.)
- Ornithogalum fissurisedulum U.Müll.-Doblies & D.Müll.-Doblies
- Ornithogalum flexuosum (Thunb.) U.Müll.-Doblies & D.Müll.-Doblies
- Ornithogalum fuscescens Boiss. & Gaill. in P.E.Boissier
- Ornithogalum gabrielianiae Agapova
- Ornithogalum gambosanum Baker in D.Oliver & auct. suc. (eds.)
- Ornithogalum geniculatum Oberm.
- Ornithogalum gorenflotii (Moret) Speta
- Ornithogalum graciliflorum K.Koch
- Ornithogalum gracillimum R.E.Fr.
- Ornithogalum graecum Zahar.
- Ornithogalum graminifolium Thunb.
- Ornithogalum gregorianum U.Müll.-Doblies & D.Müll.-Doblies
- Ornithogalum gussonei Ten.
- Ornithogalum haalenbergense U.Müll.-Doblies & D.Müll.-Doblies
- Ornithogalum hajastanum Agapova
- Ornithogalum hallii Oberm.
- Ornithogalum hispidulum U.Müll.-Doblies & D.Müll.-Doblies
- Ornithogalum hispidum Hornem.
- Ornithogalum hyrcanum Grossh.
- Ornithogalum imereticum Sosn.
- Ornithogalum immaculatum Speta
- Ornithogalum improbum Speta
- Ornithogalum inclusum F.M.Leight.
- Ornithogalum iranicum Zahar.
- Ornithogalum iraqense Feinbrun
- Ornithogalum isauricum O.D.Düsen & Sümbül
- Ornithogalum joschtiae Speta
- Ornithogalum juncifolium Jacq.
- Ornithogalum kuereanum Speta
- Ornithogalum kurdicum Bornm.
- Ornithogalum lanceolatum Labill.
- Ornithogalum lebaense van Jaarsv.
- Ornithogalum leeupoortense U.Müll.-Doblies & D.Müll.-Doblies
- Ornithogalum libanoticum Boiss.
- Ornithogalum lithopsoides van Jaarsv.
- Ornithogalum longicollum U.Müll.-Doblies & D.Müll.-Doblies
- Ornithogalum luschanii Stapf
- Ornithogalum lychnite Speta
- Ornithogalum macrum Speta
- Ornithogalum maculatum Jacq. – Snake Flower
- Ornithogalum magnum Krasch. & Schischk. in V.L.Komarov (ed.)
- Ornithogalum mater-familias U.Müll.-Doblies & D.Müll.-Doblies
- Ornithogalum mekselinae Varol
- Ornithogalum monophyllum Baker in W.H.Harvey & auct. suc. (eds.)
- Ornithogalum montanum Cirillo in M.Tenore
- Ornithogalum multifolium Baker
- Ornithogalum munzurense Speta
- Ornithogalum mysum Speta
- Ornithogalum nallihanense Y?ld. & Do?ru-Koca
- Ornithogalum namaquanulum U.Müll.-Doblies & D.Müll.-Doblies
- Ornithogalum nanodes F.M.Leight.
- Ornithogalum narbonense L. – Pyramidal Star-of-Bethlehem
- Ornithogalum navaschinii Agapova
- Ornithogalum naviculum W.F.Barker ex Oberm.
- Ornithogalum neopatersonia J.C.Manning & Goldblatt
- Ornithogalum neurostegium Boiss. & Blanche in P.E.Boissier
- Ornithogalum nivale Boiss.
- Ornithogalum niveum Aiton
- Ornithogalum nurdaniae Bagci & Savran
- Ornithogalum nutans L. – Drooping Star-of-Bethlehem
- Ornithogalum ocellatum Speta
- Ornithogalum oligophyllum E.D.Clarke
- Ornithogalum oreoides Zahar.
- Ornithogalum orthophyllum Ten.
- Ornithogalum ostrovicense F.K.Mey.
- Ornithogalum paludosum Baker
- Ornithogalum pamphylicum O.D.Düsen & Sümbül
- Ornithogalum pascheanum Speta
- Ornithogalum pedicellare Boiss. & Kotschy in F.J.A.Unger & C.G.T.Kotschy
- Ornithogalum perdurans A.P.Dold & S.A.Hammer
- Ornithogalum persicum Hausskn. ex Bornm.
- Ornithogalum pilosum L.f.
- Ornithogalum polyphyllum Jacq.
- Ornithogalum ponticum Zahar.
- Ornithogalum princeps (Baker) J.C.Manning & Goldblatt (syn. Galtonia princeps)
- Ornithogalum pruinosum F.M.Leight.
- Ornithogalum puberulum Oberm.
- Ornithogalum pullatum F.M.Leight.
- Ornithogalum pumilum Zahar.
- Ornithogalum pycnanthum Wendelbo
- Ornithogalum pyramidale L.
- Ornithogalum pyrenaicum L. – Bath Asparagus, Prussian Asparagus, Spiked Star-of-Bethlehem
- Ornithogalum refractum Kit. ex Schltdl. in C.L.von Willdenow
- Ornithogalum regale (Hilliard & B.L.Burtt) J.C.Manning & Goldblatt (syn. Galtonia regalis)
- Ornithogalum reverchonii Lange in H.M.Willkomm
- Ornithogalum rogersii Baker in W.H.Harvey & auct. suc. (eds.)
- Ornithogalum rossouwii U.Müll.-Doblies & D.Müll.-Doblies
- Ornithogalum rotatum U.Müll.-Doblies & D.Müll.-Doblies
- Ornithogalum rupestre L.f.
- Ornithogalum samariae Zahar.
- Ornithogalum sanandajense Maroofi
- Ornithogalum sandrasicum Y?ld.
- Ornithogalum sardienii van Jaarsv.
- Ornithogalum saundersiae Baker – Giant Chincherinchee
- Ornithogalum sephtonii Hilliard & B.L.Burtt
- Ornithogalum sessiliflorum Desf.
- Ornithogalum sigmoideum Freyn & Sint.
- Ornithogalum sintenisii Freyn
- Ornithogalum sorgerae Wittmann
- Ornithogalum spetae Wittmann
- Ornithogalum sphaerocarpum A.Kern.
- Ornithogalum sphaerolobum Zahar.
- Ornithogalum subcoriaceum L.Bolus
- Ornithogalum sumbulianum O.D.Düsen & Deniz
- Ornithogalum synadelphicum U.Müll.-Doblies & D.Müll.-Doblies
- Ornithogalum thermophilum F.M.Leight.
- Ornithogalum thunbergii Kunth
- Ornithogalum thyrsoides Jacq. – Chincherinchee
- Ornithogalum transcaucasicum Miscz. ex Grossh.
- Ornithogalum trichophyllum Boiss.
- Ornithogalum tropicale Baker
- Ornithogalum uluense Speta
- Ornithogalum umbellatum L. – Common Star-of-Bethlehem
- Ornithogalum umbratile Tornad. & Garbari
- Ornithogalum vasakii Speta
- Ornithogalum verae U.Müll.-Doblies & D.Müll.-Doblies
- Ornithogalum viridiflorum (I.Verd.) J.C.Manning & Goldblatt (syn. Galtonia viridiflora)
- Ornithogalum visianicum Tomm.
- Ornithogalum wiedemannii Boiss.
- Ornithogalum woronowii Krasch. in V.L.Komarov (ed.)
- Ornithogalum xanthochlorum Baker in W.H.Harvey & auct. suc. (eds.)
- Ornithogalum zebrinellum U.Müll.-Doblies & D.Müll.-Doblies

=== Organisation ===
These species have at various times been organised into sections or subgera or the entire genus split into separate genera, depending on the classification system used. For instance the three species O. broteroi Lainz, O. concinnum Salisb. and O. reverchonii Lange may be considered as a subgenus of Ornithogalum (subg. Cathissa (Salisb.) Baker or as a separate genus, Cathissa Salisb..

== Bibliography ==
- Martinez-Azorin, Mario; Crespo, Manuel B.; Juan, Ana; Fay, Michael F. (2011). "Molecular phylogenetics of subfamily Ornithogaloideae (Hyacinthaceae) based on nuclear and plastid DNA regions, including a new taxonomic arrangement". Annals of Botany. 107 (1): 1–37. doi:10.1093/aob/mcq207. PMC 3002468. PMID 21163815.
