= Inezia =

Inezia may refer to:

- Inezia (bird), a genus of birds in the family Tyrannidae.
- Inezia (plant), a genus of flower in the family Asteraceae.
