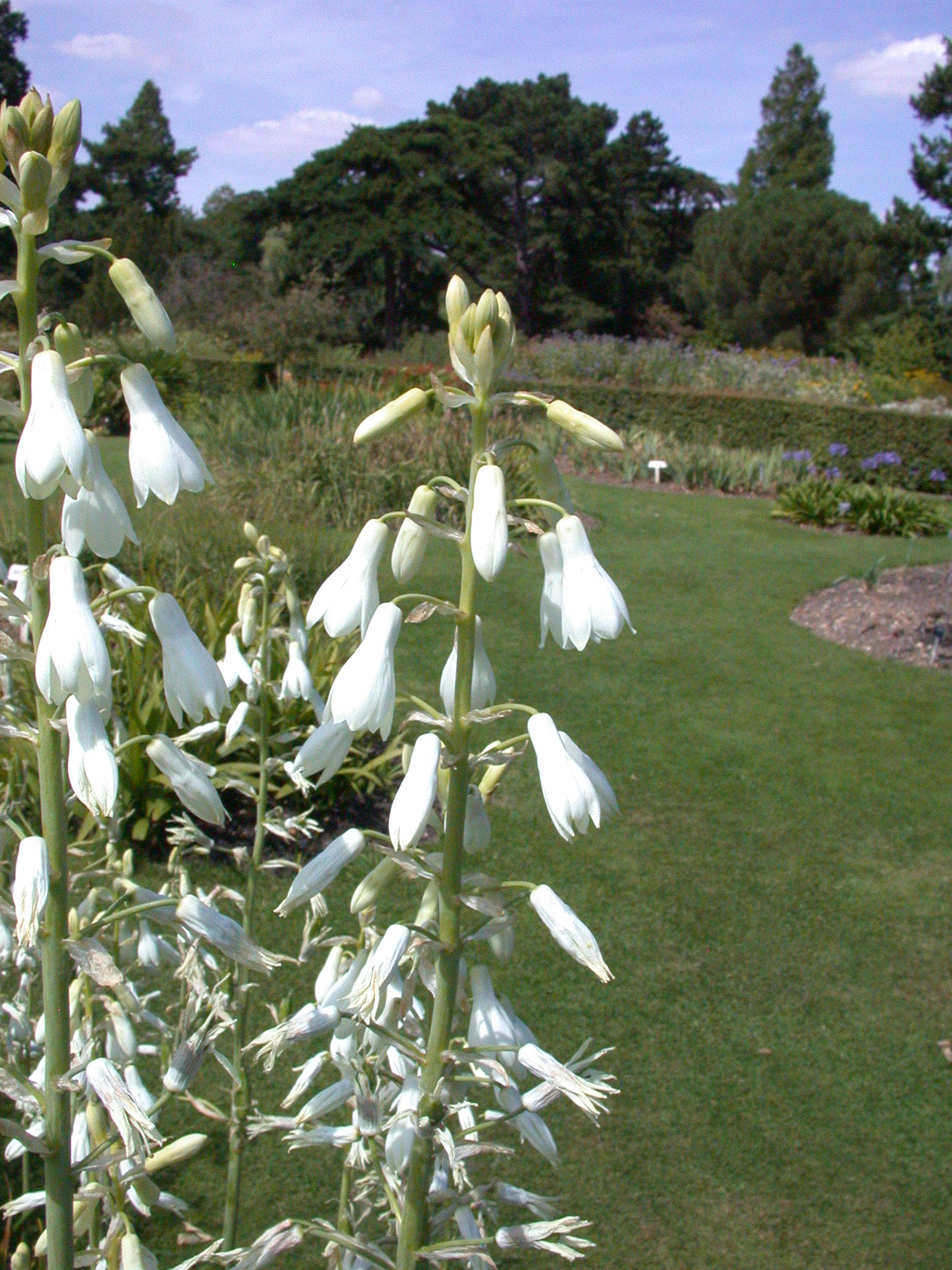
- Galtonia candicans (syn. Ornithogalum candicans)

Scientific classification
- Kingdom: Plantae
- Clade: Tracheophytes
- Clade: Angiosperms
- Clade: Monocots
- Order: Asparagales
- Family: Asparagaceae
- Subfamily: Scilloideae
- Tribe: Ornithogaleae
- Genus: Galtonia; Decne.

Type species
- Galtonia candicans (Note: There are inconsistencies in the typification. Decaisnes originally designated G. candicans as the type species. Manning et al. (2004) give G. princeps as the type, (Manning et al. 2004) but in 2009 give O. candicans as the type for subgenus Galtonia. (Manning, J.C., Forest, F., Devey, D.S., Fay, M.F. & Goldblatt, P. 2009) Martínez-Azorín et al. revert to G. princeps)

Species
- See text

Synonyms
- Hyacinthus Baker; Ornithogalum subgenus Galtonia (Decne.) J.C. Manning & Goldblatt

= Galtonia =

Genus of plants

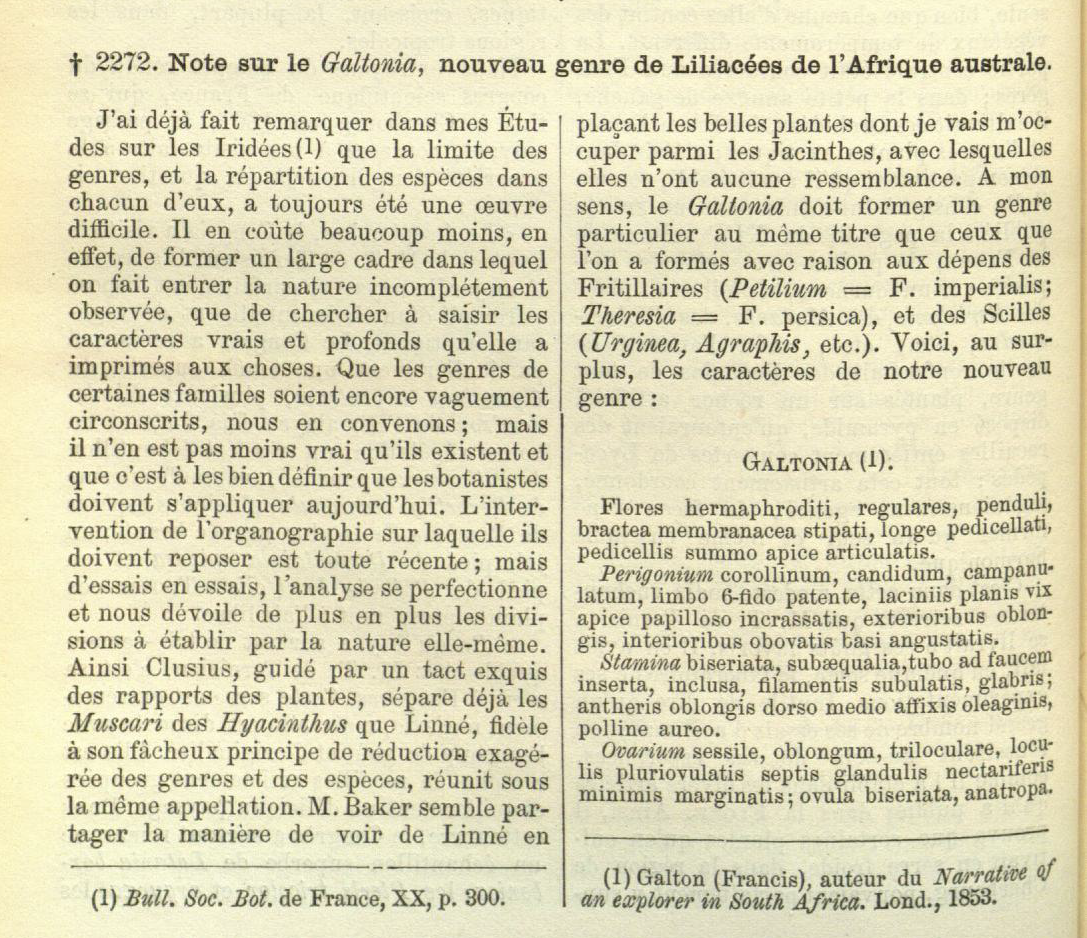
First page of Decaisne's description, 1880

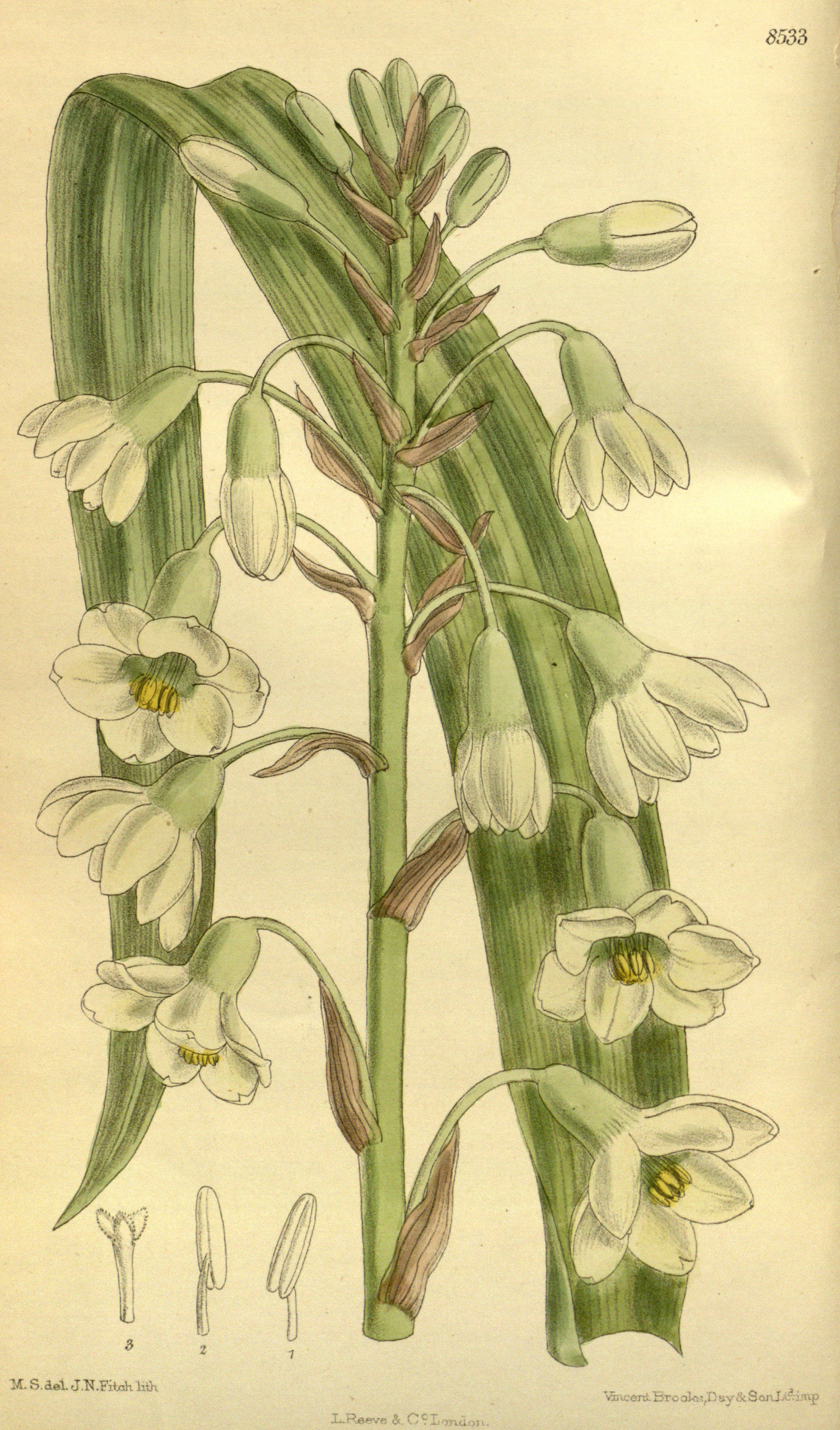
Galtonia princeps (Ornithogalum princeps), Curtis's Botanical Magazine 1914)

Galtonia is a genus of plants in the family Asparagaceae, subfamily Scilloideae. Native to Southern Africa, the genus is named after Sir Francis Galton. According to some authorities it has been subsumed into Ornithogalum as a subgenus, while others prefer to keep it as a separate genus.

== Description ==
These are large, vigorous perennial bulbous geophytes, with numerous wide (>5 cm) and large tapering glabrous leaves that ascend and sheathe the stem. The inflorescences are racemose, and conical or cylindrical, but sometimes corymbose. They bear nodding (rarely erect) flowers with fleshy white or greenish yellow tepals that are fused (rarely free) into a campanulate (bell like) tube that extends about half the length of the flower, but are never fragrant. The bracts are membranous and linear-acuminate, while bracteoles are absent. The pedicels are patent The Stamens, which are hidden amongst the perianth lobes where they are inserted at the base have ovate-acuminate (oval, tapering to a point at one end) filaments that are cylindrical and adnate to the perianth tube, merged at its end (occasionally free). The ovary may be black, green or yellow and or ovoid or cylindrical. The style is filiform (thread like) and white, with a stigma that is glandular and somewhat trilobed.

The fruit capsule is lanceolate, cylindrical or ovate and acute, and wider in its basal third. The capsule is triangular in section with blunt edges and bears seeds that are large and polygonal or irregularly flattened and biseriate. The seed testa is engraved into a puzzle like pattern. The globose bulbs have soft membranous tunics. Chromosome numbers: 2n=16 (12, 14 in G. saundersiae).

== Taxonomy ==
Galtonia was first described as a new genus within Liliaceae in 1880 by Joseph Decaisne, and appeared the following year in the 1881 Kew Gardens report. He describes two species, G. candicans (Hyacinthus candicans Baker) and G. princeps (Hyacinthus princeps Baker), which are listed in an 1884 text. These were reassignments of two of Baker's species of Hyacinthus, which he distinguished as sufficiently different to justify forming a new genus, with G. candicans the type species.

By the 1870s, as Baker describes in his revision of the family, the taxonomy of Liliaceae had become vast and complicated. Baker had placed the two species of Galtonia, which at that time he considered to be Hyacinthus in the tribe Hyacintheae, one of eight tribes that he divided the Liliaceae into. Later in the 1880s, Galtonia with its two species was included as a district and separate genus in two influential taxonomic systems. In the United Kingdom Bentham and Hooker published their volume on the Liliaceae in Latin in 1883. Bentham and Hooker divided it into 20 tribes and placed Galtonia in the tribe Scilleae with 19 other genera. In the German literature the taxonomic system of Engler completed its classification of Liliaceae in 1888. He divided the family into twelve subfamilies and subordinate tribes. Galtonia was then placed in the subfamily Lilioideae and tribe Scilleae together with 21 other genera.

In 1955 a third species, G. viridiflora, was described, followed by G. regalis in 1986. For a graphical history of its circumscription, see Manning et al. 2009 Table 1. and Martínez-Azorín et al. Table 2. Various efforts were made during the twentieth century to dismember the Liliaceae, culminating in the separation of the higher orders, Asparagales and Liliales, and the emergence of Asparagaceae as a separate family, in which the Scilleae, including Galtonia, were now the Scilloideae subfamily. Galtonia is one of the genera in the tribe Ornithogaleae, the largest tribe within the subfamily Scilloideae. Historically it was treated as part of the subfamily Ornithogaloideae of Hyacinthaceae, now obsolete terms. The preferred treatment being to consider the Hyacinthaceae as subfamily Scilloideae of Asparagaceae. The original subfamilies within Hyacinthaceae becoming tribes of subfamily Scilloideae. Thus subfamily Ornithogaloideae became tribe Ornithogaleae. The precise taxonomy of the Ornithogaloideae/Ornithogaleae has been problematic since at least the time of Linnaeus. (Note: For a discussion of the early taxonomic history of Galtonia and related genera, see Pfosser and Speta (Pfosser & Speta 1999))

=== Phylogenetics ===
Phylogenetic analysis utilising plastid gene sequencing (trnL-F) brought some new clarity to the complex and controversial taxonomy of subfamily Scilloideae, with Pfosser and Speta (1999) demonstrating that the Ornithogaloideae/Ornithogaleae were one of four major clades within the subfamily. This clade also demonstrated two subclades, Ornithogaleae and Dipcadieae (which included Galtonia). Further work by Manning et al. did not support the concept of these subclades and subsumed all of the subfamily Scilloideae into the genus Ornithogalum with about 300 species. At the same time they pointed out the historical importance of Galtonia and its distinct floral characteristics and horticultural importance. In considering the circumscription of Galtonia, they pointed out that the genus was paraphyletic unless it included Ornithogalum saundersiae, but to include it created problems of morphological circumscription.

This sensu lato reduction of Speta's fourteen genera into one was not widely accepted, even though they were polyphyletic, and had a number of problems. (This also had the effect of eliminating Galtonia as a genus, under which a number of Ornithogalum species are still sold.)

Further analysis with wider sampling (70 compared to 40 taxa) and an additional plastid region (matK) revealed the presence of three clades (A, B and C) within Ornithogaleae/Ornithogalum. Consequently, a new classification was proposed with three tribes and four genera, Ornithogalum corresponding to Clade C, was placed in tribe Ornithogaleae, but further subdivided into four subgenera and further sections, with 160 species. Thus three of Speta's other thirteen genera were resurrected. Galtonia on the other hand was retained as a taxon but as a subgenus of Ornithogalum with seven species.

Subsequently, an alternative approach was suggested combining plastid gene sequences with nuclear DNA sequences, morphology and biogeography. This supported Manning et al.'s Clade C within which Ornithogalum was contained, but the very large subgenus Ornithogalum was noted to still be heterogeneous, an issue which those authors had managed by treating the subgenus in seven sections. In contrast Martínez-Azorín et al. suggested reversing the sensu lato (lumping) approach of Manning et al., reverting to separate genera (splitting), thus resurrecting Galtonia and eighteen other genera.

As of April 2015 the sensu lato approach of Manning et al. (2009) is still in use by the World Checklist of Selected Plant Families. (Note: The Plant List lists Galtonia with one species (G. viridiflorum), (The Plant List 2013) citing Tropicos as its source. The latter lists five species, by including G. clavata. (Tropicos 2015) The discrepancy may arise from the fact that G. viridiflora appears twice in the Tropicos list, using two separate but similarly sounding authority abbreviations, Verdc. and I.Verd., while The Plant List gives both entries with only one listed as 'accepted'. (The Plant List 2013, Galtonia viridiflora) The correct attribution is I.Verd. (Inez Verdoorn))

=== Subdivision ===
Manning et al. (2009) reconstructed Galtonia as a subgenus of Ornithogalum, but with two sections and a type species of O. candicans;

- section Xanthochlora (U. Müll.-Doblies & D. Müll.-Doblies) J. C. Manning & Goldblatt (2 species; type O. xanthochlorum)
- section Galtonia (Decne) J. C. Manning & Goldblatt (5 species; type O. candicans)

=== Species ===
The number of species has varied from four to seven.

The traditional four species were;

- Galtonia candicans (Baker) Decne.
- Galtonia princeps (Baker) Decne.
- Galtonia regalis Hilliard & B.L.Burtt
- Galtonia viridiflora Verdoorn.

and these were transferred to Ornithogalum by Manning et al. (2004). When reconstructed as a subgenus there were seven species;

- section Xanthochlora
  - Ornithogalum haalenbergense U. Müll.-Doblies & D. Müll.-Doblies.
  - Ornithogalum xanthochlorum Baker
- section Galtonia
  - Ornithogalum candicans (Baker) J.C. Manning & Goldblatt
  - Ornithogalum princeps (Baker) J.C. Manning & Goldblatt
  - Ornithogalum regale (Hilliard & B.L. Burtt) J.C. Manning & Goldblatt
  - Ornithogalum saundersiae Baker
  - Ornithogalum viridiflorum (I. Verd.) J.C. Manning & Goldblatt

In the system of Martínez-Azorín et al. (2011) the original four species (Galtonia sensu stricto) are maintained, together with Galtonia saundersiae (Baker) Mart.-Azorín, M.B.Crespo & Juan as the fifth species, while the two species of section Xanthochlora, a sister clade, are transferred to a separate genus—Ethesia.

As of April 2015 The World Checklist of Selected Plant Families lists six species with their preferred synonyms;

- Galtonia candicans = Ornithogalum candicans
- Galtonia clavata Baker ex Mast. = Pseudogaltonia clavata (Baker ex Mast.) E.Phillips
- Galtonia princeps = Ornithogalum princeps
- Galtonia regalis = Ornithogalum regale
- Galtonia saundersiae = Ornithogalum saundersiae
- Galtonia viridiflora = Ornithogalum viridiflorum

=== Etymology ===
The genus Galtonia was named by Decaisne after Sir Francis Galton, who had published his account of his travels in South Africa.

== Distribution and habitat ==
The species of Galtonia sensu stricto are distributed in the high precipitation summer rainfall, high-altitude areas of the Drakensberg, Low Drakensberg, Southern Berg and Natal Midlands of the eastern provinces of South Africa (KwaZulu-Natal, Free State, Mpumalanga and Eastern Cape) and Lesotho.

== Uses ==
- Galtonia viridiflora with its pale green flowers, and the white flowered Galtonia candicans or Cape Hyacinth are sold as ornamental garden plants, usually as Galtonia, while Galtonia saundersiae is more commonly listed as Ornithogalum.

== See also ==
- Taxonomy of Liliaceae

== Bibliography ==
- APG III (2009). "An Update of the Angiosperm Phylogeny Group classification for the orders and families of flowering plants: APG III". Botanical Journal of the Linnean Society. 161 (2): 105–121. doi:10.1111/j.1095-8339.2009.00996.x. hdl:10654/18083.
- Chase, M.W.; Reveal, J.L.; Fay, M.F. (2009), "A subfamilial classification for the expanded asparagalean families Amaryllidaceae, Asparagaceae and Xanthorrhoeaceae", Botanical Journal of the Linnean Society, 161 (2): 132–136, doi:10.1111/j.1095-8339.2009.00999.x
- Hilliard, OM; Burtt, BL (1986). "Notes on some plants of southern Africa chiefly from Natal, 13". Notes Roy. Bot. Gard. Edinburgh. 43 (3): 345–405. doi:10.24823/nrbge.1986.3446.
- Hilliard, OM; Burtt, BL (1988). "A revision of Galtonia (Liliaceae)". Notes from the Royal Botanic Garden, Edinburgh. 45 (1): 95–104. doi:10.24823/nrbge.1988.3510.
- Klopper, Ronell R (2005). "Galtonia candicans (Baker) Decne". PlantZAfrica.com. South African National Biodiversity Institute. Archived from the original on 19 March 2015.
- Kubitzki, K., ed. (1998). The families and genera of vascular plants. Vol.3 Monocotyledons: Lilianae (except Orchidaceae). Berlin, Germany: Springer-Verlag. ISBN 978-3-540-64060-8.
- Manning, J.C.; Goldblatt, P.; Fay, M.F. (2004). "A revised generic synopsis of Hyacintheaceae in sub-Saharan Africa, based on molecular evidence, including new combinations and the new tribe Pseudoprospereae". Edinburgh Journal of Botany. 60 (3): 533–568. doi:10.1017/S0960428603000404. S2CID 86097586.
- Manning, J.C.; Forest, F.; Devey, D.S.; Fay, M.F. & Goldblatt, P. (2009). "A molecular phylogeny and a revised classification of Ornithogaloideae (Hyacinthaceae) based on an analysis of four placid DNA regions". Taxon. 58 (1): 77–107. doi:10.1002/tax.581011. JSTOR 27756826.
- Martínez-Azorín, Mario; Crespo, Manuel B.; Juan, Ana; Fay, Michael F. (2011). "Molecular phylogenetics of subfamily Ornithogaloideae (Hyacinthaceae) based on nuclear and plastid DNA regions, including a new taxonomic arrangement". Annals of Botany. 107 (1): 1–37. doi:10.1093/aob/mcq207. PMC 3002468. PMID 21163815.
- Pfosser, Martin; Speta, Franz (1999). "Phylogenetics of Hyacinthaceae based on plastid DNA sequences". Annals of the Missouri Botanical Garden. 86 (4): 852–875. doi:10.2307/2666172. JSTOR 2666172.
- Speta, F. (1998). Hyacinthaceae. Springer. pp. 261–285. ISBN 9783540640608. In Kubitzki (1998)
- Stedje, Brita (1989). "Chromosome evolution within the Ornithogalum tenuifolium complex (Hyacinthaceae), with special emphasis on the evolution of bimodal karyotypes". Plant Systematics and Evolution. 166 (1–2): 79–89. doi:10.1007/BF00937877. S2CID 30809941.
- Verdoorn, IC (July 1955). "Galtonia viridiflora. sp. nov". Flowering Plants of Africa. 30: 1188.
- Walters, Stuart Max; Cullen, James, eds. (1986). The European Garden Flora. Cambridge University Press. ISBN 978-0-521-24859-4.

=== Historical sources ===
- Baker, JG (1871). "A revision of the genera and species of herbaceous gamophyllous Liliaceae". Journal of the Linnean Society, Botany. 11 (54–55): 349–436. doi:10.1111/j.1095-8339.1870.tb00068.x. hdl:2027/hvd.32044106471428.
- Baker, JG (1886). "Galtonia clavata". Curtis's Botanical Magazine. 112: t. 6885.
- Bentham, G.; Hooker, J.D. (1883). Genera plantarum ad exemplaria imprimis in herbariis kewensibus servata definita. Vol III Part II. London: L Reeve & Co.
- Britten, James, ed. (1880). Trimen's Journal of Botany: British and Foreign vol.18. London: West, Newman & Co.
- Decaisne, Joseph (1880). "Note sur le Galtonia, nouveau genre de Liliacées de 1'Afrique australe". Flore des Serres et des Jardins de l'Europe. 23 (ser. 2, 13): 32–33.
- Engler, Adolf; Prantl, Karl, eds. (1888). Die Natürlichen Pflanzenfamilien nebst ihren Gattungen und wichtigeren Arten, insbesondere den Nutzpflanzen, unter Mitwirkung zahlreicher hervorragender Fachgelehrten 1887–1915 II(5). Leipzig: W. Engelmann.
- Galton, Francis (1853). Narrative of an explorer in South Africa. London.
- Hooker, JD (1882). Report on the Progress and Condition of the Royal Gardens at Kew during the year 1881. London: Clowes.
- Just, Leopold, ed. (1884). Botanischer Jahresbericht: Systematisch geordnetes Repertorium der botanischen Literatur aller Länder. Berlin: Gebr. Borntraeger.
- Saunders, W. W., ed. (1870). Refugium botanicum: or figures and descriptions from living specimens, of little known or new plants of botanical interest vol. III. London: John van Voorst.

=== Databases ===
- Stevens, P.F. (2015) [1st. Pub. 2001], "APW", Angiosperm Phylogeny Website, Missouri Botanical Garden
- "Galtonia". The Plant List (2013). Version 1.1. 2013.
- "Galtonia". Tropicos. Missouri Botanical Garden. 2015.
- "Galtonia Decne". International Plant Names Index (IPNI). Royal Botanic Gardens, Kew; Harvard University Herbaria & Libraries; Australian National Botanic Gardens.
- "Galtonia Decne., Ann. Gén. Hort. 23: 32 (1880)". World Checklist of Selected Plant Families. Royal Botanic Gardens, Kew.
- "Galtonia Decne". eMonocot. 2014.

=== Searches ===
- Galtonia at Biodiversity Heritage Library
