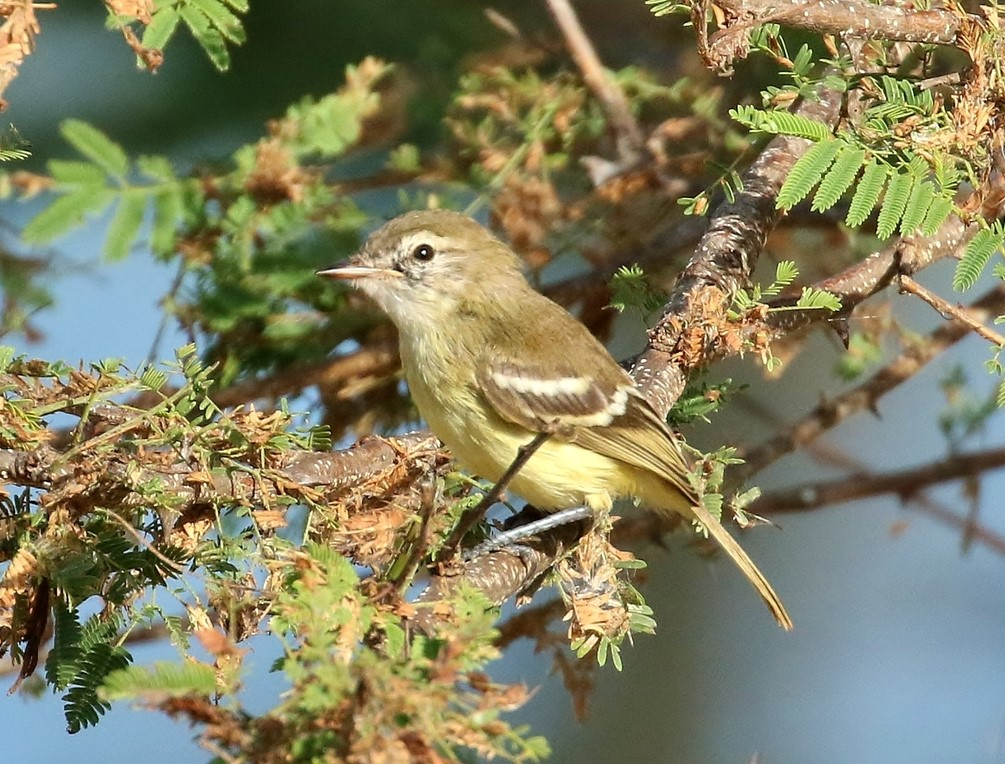

Conservation status
- Least Concern (IUCN 3.1)

Scientific classification
- Kingdom: Animalia
- Phylum: Chordata
- Class: Aves
- Order: Passeriformes
- Family: Tyrannidae
- Genus: Inezia
- Species: I. tenuirostris

Binomial name
- Inezia tenuirostris (Cory, 1913)

= Slender-billed inezia =

Species of bird

The slender-billed inezia, or slender-billed tyrannulet, (Inezia tenuirostris) is a species of bird in the family Tyrannidae, the tyrant flycatchers. It is found in Colombia and Venezuela.

== Taxonomy and systematics ==
The slender-billed inezia was originally described as Camptostoma pussillum tenuirostris, a subspecies of what is now the southern beardless tyrannulet (Camptostoma obsoletum). Some taxonomists later placed it as a full species in genus Phaeomyias and eventually in its current genus Inezia. Some ornithologists propose that Inezia is polyphyletic and that the slender-billed inezia should properly be in its own genus.

The slender-billed inezia is monotypic.

== Description ==
The slender-billed inezia is 9 to 9.5 cm (3.5 to 3.7 in) long and weighs 5 to 6 g (0.18 to 0.21 oz). The sexes have the same plumage. Adults have a grayish olive crown. Their face is mostly whitish with a thin white supercilium and a thin white eye-ring. Their back and rump are grayish olive. Their wings are dusky with dull white edges on the inner flight feathers and tips of the wing coverts; the latter show as two wing bars. Their tail is dusky olive with thin white outer edges and tips on the feathers. Their throat is whitish and their breast and belly dingy grayish white with a pale yellow tinge on the belly and undertail coverts. They have a dark brown iris, a needle-like black bill, and gray legs and feet.

== Distribution and habitat ==
The slender-billed inezia is found from northeastern Magdalena Department east through La Guajira Department in extreme northeastern Colombia across northwestern Venezuela to Yaracuy and eastern Falcón states. It inhabits a variety of arid landscapes including thorn scrub, dry woodlands, cactus desert, and pastures with thorny shrubs; on the immediate coast it also occurs at the edges of mangroves. It favors areas dominated by Acacia. In elevation it ranges from sea level to 500 m (1,600 ft) in Colombia and to 800 m (2,600 ft) in Venezuela.

== Behavior ==
=== Movement ===
The slender-billed inezia is a year-round resident.

=== Feeding ===
The slender-billed inezia feeds on arthropods and small fruits. It typically forages alone or in pairs and seldom joins mixed-species feeding flocks. It takes prey and fruits from foliage and twigs by gleaning while perched and by briefly hovering after a short flight. Its feeding behavior has been compared to that of vireos.

=== Breeding ===
Nothing is known about the slender-billed inezia's breeding biology.

=== Vocalization ===
The slender-billed inezia's song is "a flat, insipid trill, tleeeeeeee'e'e'e'e'e'e'e'e, thin and slightly descending or attenuated at end". It also makes a "whistled 'teer-'téér-teer-terr-teer' ".

== Status ==
The IUCN has assessed the slender-billed inezia as being of Least Concern. Its population size is not known and is believed to be decreasing. No immediate threats have been identified. It is considered locally common in Colombia and common in Venezuela. "Although large expanses of suitable habitat remain within the species' limited range, none is protected; moreover, substantial areas have been destroyed...as a result of overgrazing, firewood-gathering, tourist development and environmental pollution."
