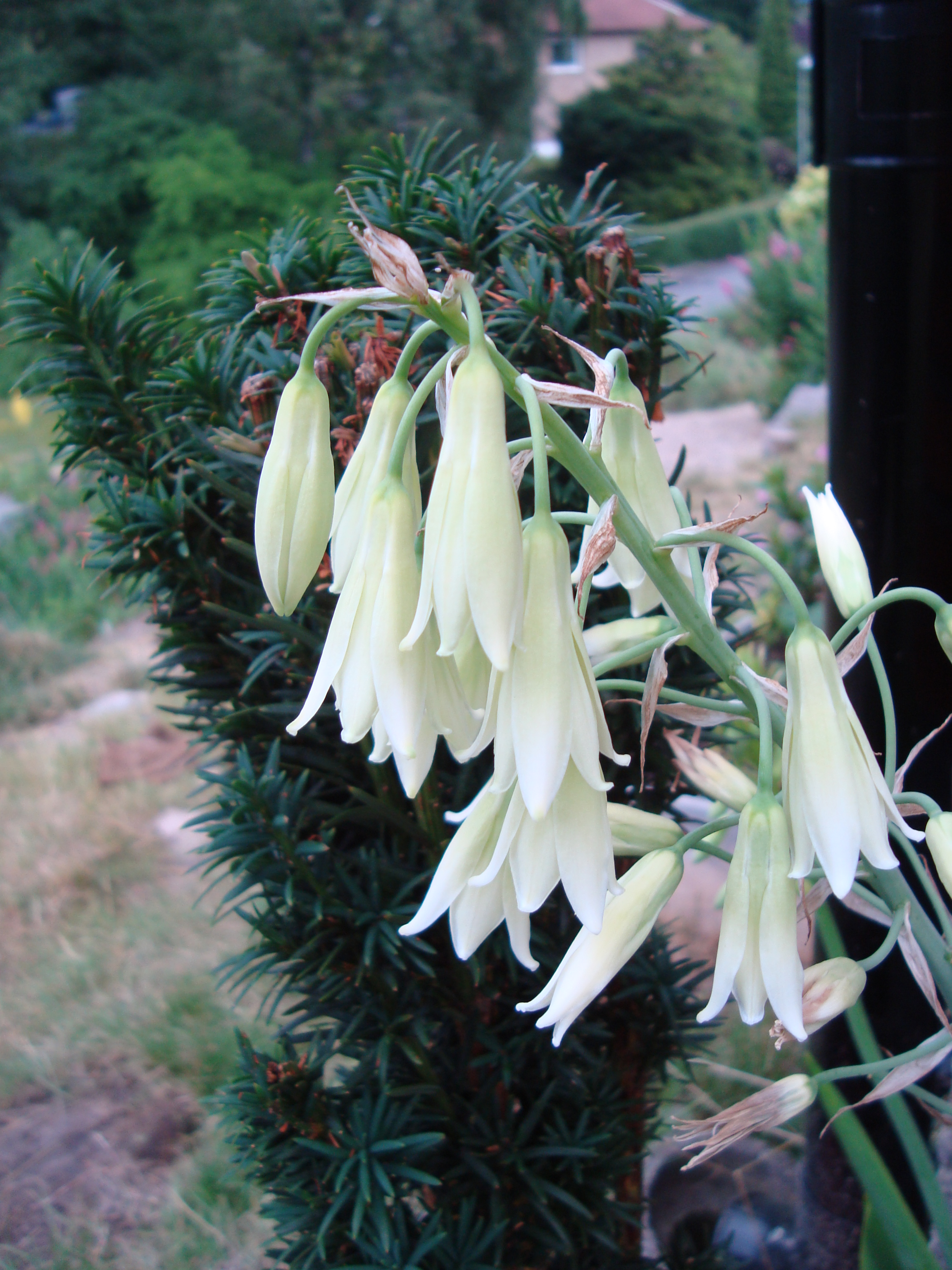

Scientific classification
- Kingdom: Plantae
- Clade: Tracheophytes
- Clade: Angiosperms
- Clade: Monocots
- Order: Asparagales
- Family: Asparagaceae
- Subfamily: Scilloideae
- Tribe: Ornithogaleae
- Genus: Ornithogalum
- Species: O. viridiflorum

Binomial name
- Ornithogalum viridiflorum (I.Verd.) J.C.Manning & Goldblatt

Synonyms
- Galtonia viridiflora I.Verd.; Galtonia candicans 'Viridiflora'

= Ornithogalum viridiflorum =

Species of flowering plant

Ornithogalum viridiflorum, syn. Galtonia viridiflora, the green flowered Galtonia, is a species of bulbous flowering plant from South Africa and Lesotho, grown as an ornamental plant in gardens. It is often sold under its older name Galtonia viridiflora.

== Description ==
Perennial bulbous geophyte, with strap-shaped leaves and erect stems up to 1 m in height. The inflorescence consists of a cone-shaped terminal raceme. The flowers, which appear in late summer, are pendant, bell-shaped and yellow to green (hence the name viridiflorum).

== Cultivation ==
Requires well-drained soil and prefers full sun. In colder climates, mulching or lifting and over wintering are necessary. The leaves and stems are shorter than Ornithogalum candicans with which it is sometimes confused. The latter has white flowers,

== Bibliography ==
- RHS (2015). "Galtonia viridiflora".
- Hughes, David (2014). "Galtonia candicans - Galtonia viridiflora". Gardenseeker.co.uk.
- Verdoorn, IC (July 1955). "Galtonia viridiflora. sp. nov". Flowering Plants of Africa. 30: 1188.
