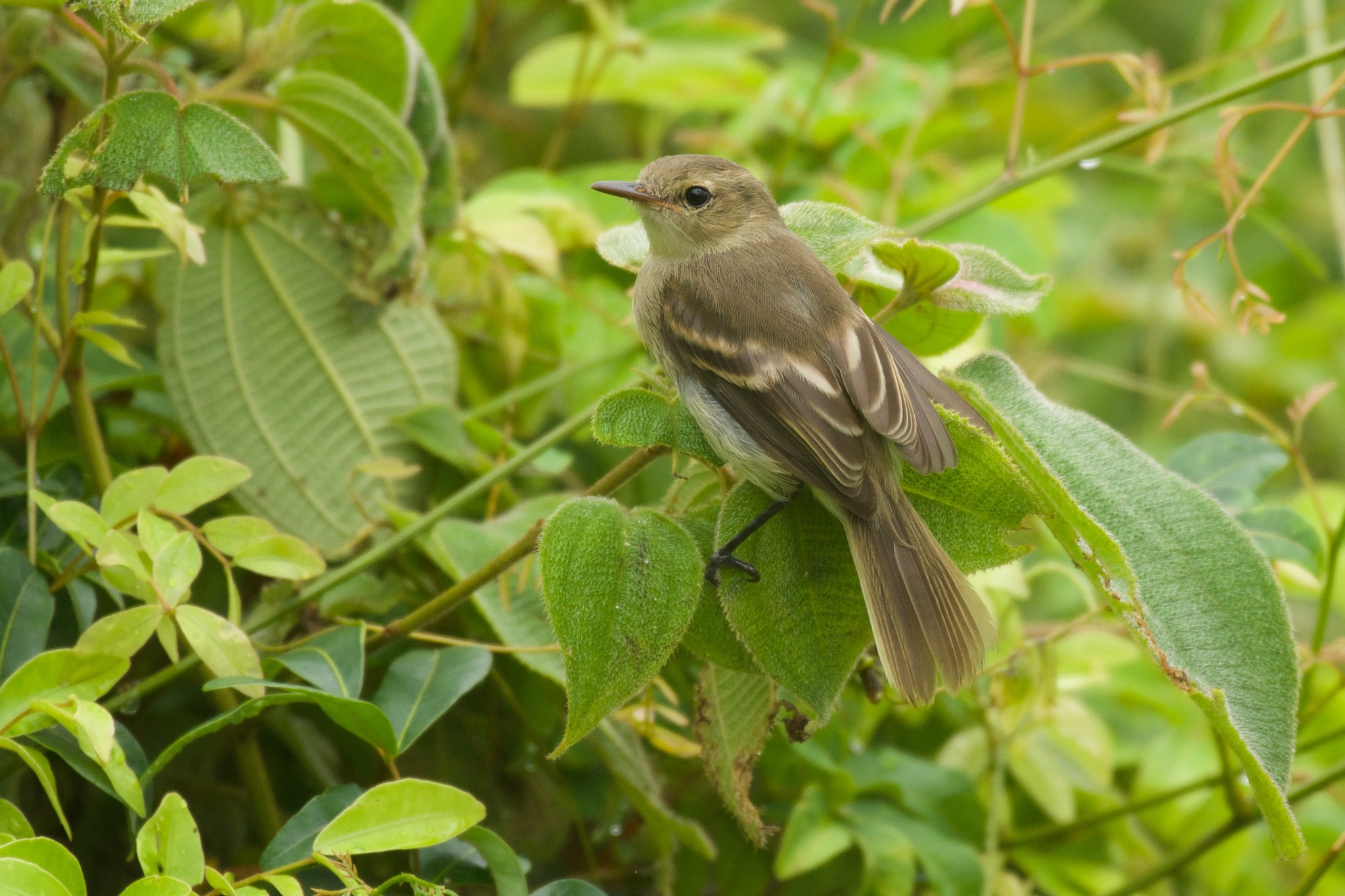

Conservation status
- Vulnerable (IUCN 3.1)

Scientific classification
- Kingdom: Animalia
- Phylum: Chordata
- Class: Aves
- Order: Passeriformes
- Family: Tyrannidae
- Genus: Nesotriccus
- Species: N. ridgwayi

Binomial name
- Nesotriccus ridgwayi C. H. Townsend, 1895

= Cocos tyrannulet =

Species of bird

The Cocos tyrannulet (Nesotriccus ridgwayi), also known as the Cocos flycatcher, is a vulnerable species of bird in subfamily Elaeniinae of family Tyrannidae, the tyrant flycatchers. It is endemic to Cocos Island off Costa Rica.

== Taxonomy and systematics ==
The Cocos tyrannulet is treated as a monotypic species. However, a study published in 2016 contends that it should be treated as a subspecies of what was then the mouse-colored tyrannulet. That species has since been split into the northern mouse-colored tyrannulet (N. incomtus) and southern mouse-colored tyrannulet (N. murinus).

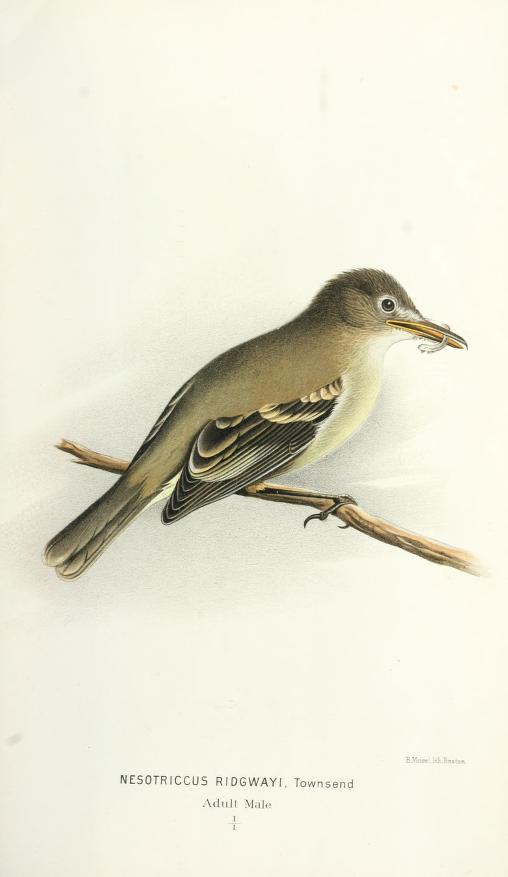
Illustration by Charles Haskins Townsend

== Description ==
The Cocos tyrannulet is about 11 cm (4.3 in) long and weighs about 11 g (0.39 oz). The sexes have the same plumage. Adults have a grayish olive to dark brownish olive crown, a slightly paler supercilium and cheeks, and a thin dark line through the eye. Their upperparts are grayish olive to dark brownish olive. Their wings are dusky with dull yellowish buff edges on the flight feathers and tips on the coverts; the latter show as two wing bars. Their tail is dusky. Their throat and underparts are pale yellowish with a brownish to olive wash on the breast. Both sexes have a dark brown iris, a long, wide bill whose maxilla is brown to black and its mandible pale with a dusky tip, and dark gray legs and feet. Juveniles are browner than adults and have buffy to cinnamon wingbars.

== Distribution and habitat ==
The Cocos tyrannulet is found only on Cocos Island, which is politically part of Costa Rica though about 550 km (340 mi) distant from the mainland in the Pacific. It inhabits the edges and interior of subtropical and tropical evergreen forest, secondary forest, and scrubby and swampy areas. In elevation it ranges from sea level to about 575 m (1,900 ft).

== Behavior ==
=== Movement ===
The Cocos tyrannulet is a year-round resident.

=== Feeding ===
The Cocos tyrannulet feeds mostly on arthropods but also occasionally includes fruit in its diet. It forages fairly high in dense vegetation. It takes prey mostly by striking upward to foliage from a perch; it also gleans while perched, briefly hovers to glean, and makes sallies to take prey on the wing.

=== Breeding ===
The Cocos tyrannulet breeds between January and April. Both sexes construct the nest, an open cup of plant fibers and fungal rhizomorphs lined with feathers. Its outside is often covered with spider egg sacs. It is typically firmly attached to twigs and vines about 10 to 25 m (35 to 80 ft) above the ground in a tree top. The clutch appears to usually be one egg which the female alone incubates. The incubation period, time to fledging, and details of parental care are not known.

=== Vocalization ===
As of late 2024 xeno-canto had no recordings of Cocos tyrannulet vocalizations and the Cornell Lab of Ornithology's Macaulay Library had eight. Males have two songs "an explosive, dry, descending chatter of 6–9 syllables, speeding up near end, and a series of low-intensity 'tic' notes followed by explosive trill of 7–10 syllables". The female's song is "an explosive series of 9–10 notes followed by additional, much softer notes trailing off". All three songs start loud and decrease in volume. Male and female sometimes sing in a ragged duet.

== Status ==
The IUCN has assessed the Cocos tyrannulet as Vulnerable. It has a very small range; its estimated population of between 6000 and 15,000 mature individuals is believed to be stable. "Rats and cats are potential predators, and feral deer, pigs and goats graze suitable habitat. Pigs especially devastate the lower strata and understorey of native forests and inhibit forest regeneration." Disturbance from tourism is a relatively minor concern as well. The island is a national park with no permanent settlements and its forest cover remains mostly intact. However, there are no efforts to control the populations of introduced mammals.
