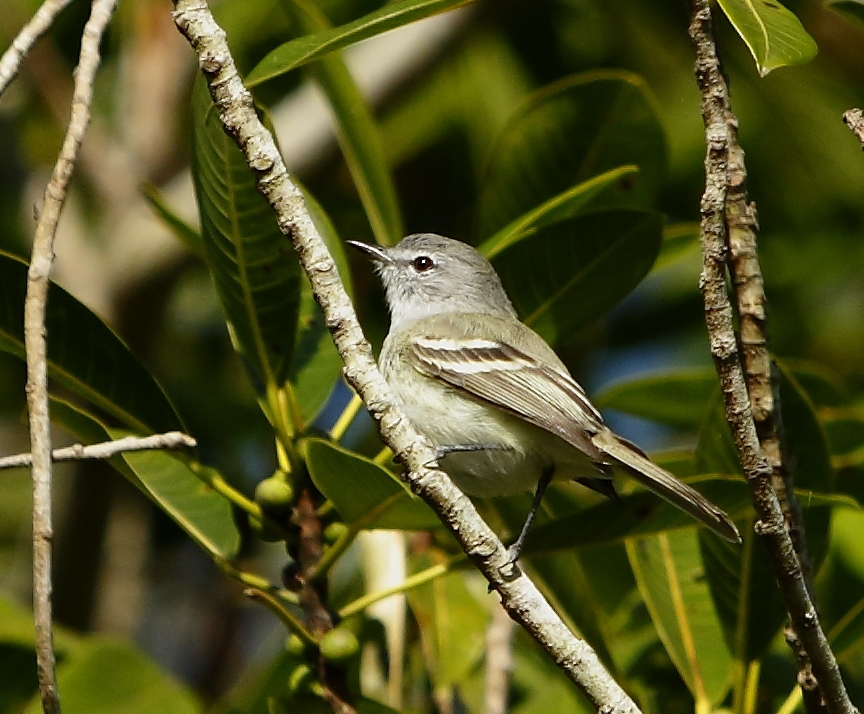
- at Aquidauana River, Aquidauana, Mato Grosso do Sul state, Brazil

Conservation status
- Least Concern (IUCN 3.1)

Scientific classification
- Kingdom: Animalia
- Phylum: Chordata
- Class: Aves
- Order: Passeriformes
- Family: Tyrannidae
- Genus: Inezia
- Species: I. inornata

Binomial name
- Inezia inornata (Salvadori, 1897)

= Plain inezia =

Species of bird

The plain inezia, or plain tyrannulet, (Inezia inornata) is a species of passerine bird in the family Tyrannidae, the tyrant flycatchers. It is found in Argentina, Bolivia, Brazil, Paraguay, and Peru.

== Taxonomy and systematics ==
The plain inezia was originally described as Serpophaga inornata. By the late twentieth century it had been moved to its present genus Inezia.

The plain inezia is monotypic.

== Description ==
The plain inezia is about 9 cm (3.5 in) long and weighs 5.5 to 6 g (0.19 to 0.21 oz). The sexes have the same plumage. Adults have a grayish to olive-gray crown. Their face is mostly whitish with a thin white supercilium and a thin white eye-ring. Their back and rump are grayish to olive-gray. Their wings are dusky with dull white edges on the inner flight feathers and tips of the wing coverts; the latter show as two wing bars. Their tail is dusky. Their throat is whitish and their breast and belly dingy gray with a pale yellow tinge on the lower belly and undertail coverts. They have a dark brown iris, a thin black bill with sometimes a paler base to the mandible, and gray legs and feet.

== Distribution and habitat ==
The plain tyrannulet breeds from southern Beni Department in central Bolivia south to northern Paraguay and Salta and western Jujuy provinces in northwestern Argentina. In the non-breeding season many move north into northern Bolivia, Peru's Puno, and Madre de Dios departments and southwestern Amazonian Brazil. In the breeding season it inhabits deciduous and semi-deciduous woodlands and the drier Gran Chaco. In the non-breeding season it mostly occurs in shrubby early successional vegetation along rivers and other watercourses. In elevation it ranges from near sea level to 700 m (2,300 ft).

== Behavior ==
=== Movement ===
As noted above, the plain tyrannulet is a partial migrant, with individuals moving between the southern parts of its range into Peru and Brazil after the breeding season.

=== Feeding ===
The plain inezia feeds on arthropods and probably also small fruits. It typically forages alone or in pairs and occasionally joins mixed-species feeding flocks. It takes prey and fruits from foliage and twigs mostly by gleaning while perched and also by briefly hovering after a short flight.

=== Breeding ===
The plain inezia's breeding season has not been defined but appears to include November in Bolivia. Nothing else is known about the species' breeding biology.

=== Vocalization ===
The plain inezia's song is a "somewhat musical series of thin whistles with [an] emphatic introductory note, 'psee-tee-ee-ee-ee' ".

== Status ==
The IUCN has assessed the plain inezia as being of Least Concern. It has a large range; its population size is not known and is believed to be decreasing. No immediate threats have been identified. It is thought to be generally uncommon and is considered rare in Peru. It occurs in several protected areas across its range.
