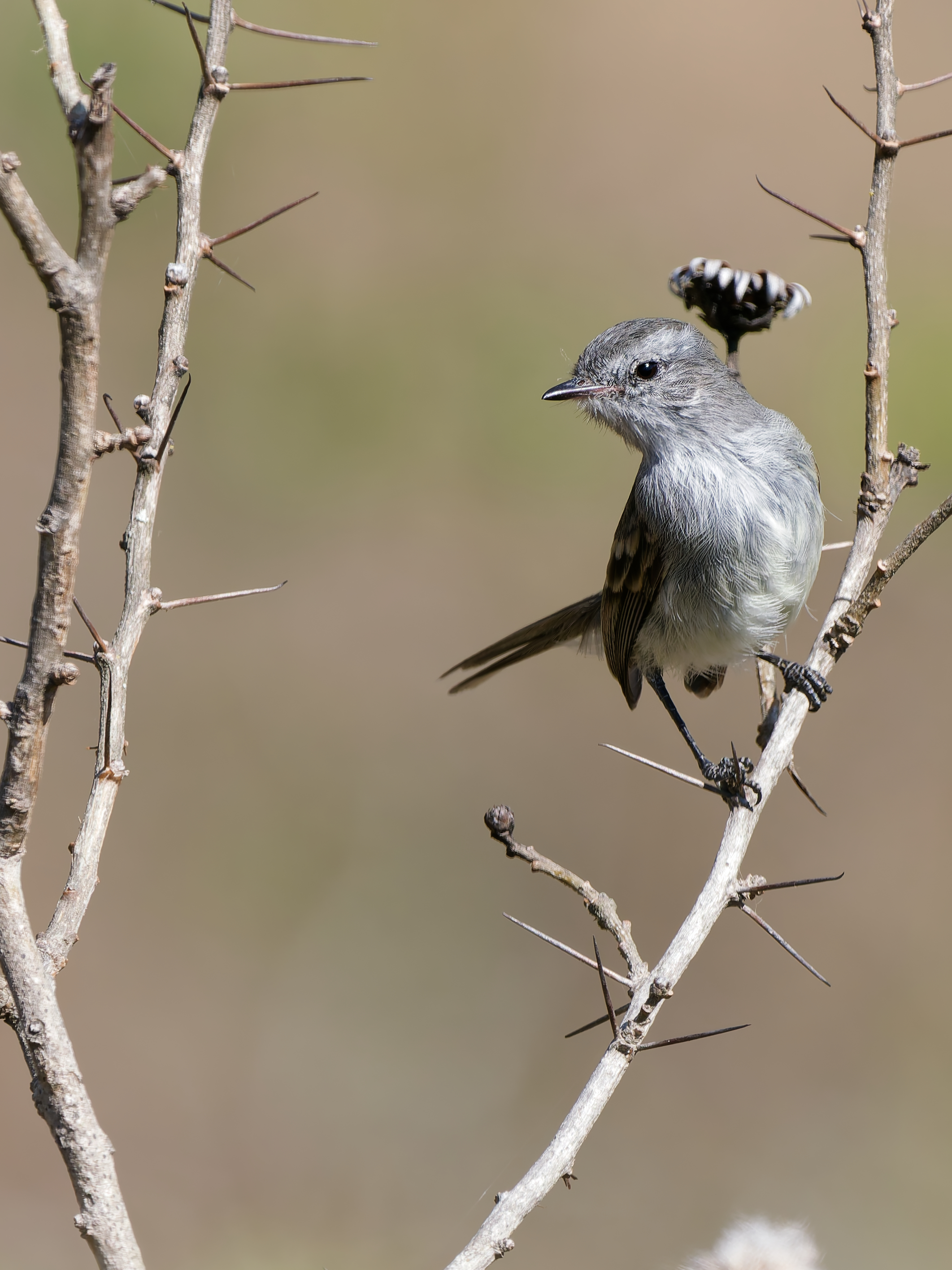
- Tumbesian Tyrannulet in Peru

Conservation status
- Least Concern (IUCN 3.1)

Scientific classification
- Kingdom: Animalia
- Phylum: Chordata
- Class: Aves
- Order: Passeriformes
- Family: Tyrannidae
- Genus: Nesotriccus
- Species: N. tumbezanus

Binomial name
- Nesotriccus tumbezanus (Taczanowski, 1877)
- Range of Tumbesian (coastal) and Maranon (inland) tyrannulets; see the taxonomy and status sections

Synonyms
- Phyllomyias tumbezana (protonym)

= Tumbesian tyrannulet =

Species of bird

The Tumbesian tyrannulet or Tumbes tyrannulet (Nesotriccus tumbezanus) is a species of bird in subfamily Elaeniinae of family Tyrannidae, the tyrant flycatchers. It is found in Ecuador and Peru.

== Taxonomy and systematics ==
What is now the Tumbesian tyrannulet was previously considered a subspecies of what was then the mouse-colored tyrannulet. The unsplit species bore the binomial Phaeomyias murina. Genetic analysis showed that Phaeomyias was embedded within Nesotriccus and by the principle of priority, beginning in 2018 most taxonomists moved the species to Nesotriccus. However, as of late 2024 BirdLife International's Handbook of the Birds of the World (HBW) retained the species in genus Phaeomyias.

Beyond the move to genus Nesotriccus the Tumbesian tyrannulet's taxonomy is unsettled. Based on multiple lines of evidence the mouse-colored tyrannulet was split into several species, one of which is the Tumbesian tyrannulet. The International Ornithological Committee (IOC) and the Clements taxonomy assign it two subspecies, the nominate N. t. tumbezanus (Taczanowski, 1877) and N. t. inflavus (Chapman, 1924). HBW includes a third subspecies, maranonica, which the IOC and Clements treat as a separate species, the Maranon tyrannulet (N. maranonicus).

The Tumbesian tyrannulet's English name comes from the Department of Tumbes, Peru, which is approximately in the center of its range.

This article follows the two-subspecies model.

== Description ==
The Tumbesian tyrannulet is about 12 cm (4.7 in) long. The sexes have the same plumage. Adults of the nominate subspecies have a drab gray-brown head with an indistinct whitish supercilium. Their upperparts and tail are drab brownish gray. Their wings are dusky with somewhat ochraceous or buff tips on the coverts that show as two wing bars. Their throat, breast, and flanks are grayish and their belly pale yellow. Subspecies N. t. inflavus has a paler gray breast and flanks than the nominate and a whitish belly. Both sexes of both subspecies have a brown iris, a stubby bill with cream at the base of the mandible, and black legs and feet.

== Distribution and habitat ==
The Tumbesian tyrannulet is a bird of the coastal lowlands to foothills of Ecuador and Peru. The nominate subspecies is found from central Manabí Province in west-central Ecuador south into northwestern Peru through eastern Tumbes and Piura departments into northeastern Lambayeque Department. Subspecies N. t. inflavus is found in Peru from central Piura and Lambayeque departments south to northern Lima Department. The species primarily inhabits arid lowland scrublands and open woodlands, but especially in southern Ecuador inhabits moister valleys penetrating the Andean foothills to the east. In elevation it ranges from sea level to 2,300 m (7,500 ft) in Ecuador and to 2,000 m (6,600 ft) in Peru.

== Behavior ==
=== Movement ===
The Tumbesian tyrannulet apparently is partially migratory though details are lacking. For instance, it is known from the Cerro Blanco Forest in Ecuador only between July and November.

=== Feeding ===
As far as is known, the Tumbesian tyrannulet's diet and foraging behavior are the same as those of the southern mouse-colored tyrannulet, which see here.

=== Breeding ===
The Tumbesian tyrannulet breeds between early February and mid-April. Its nest is a cup made from leaf veins, seed down, small twigs, and feathers. It is typically placed in a branch fork of a bush or small tree up to about 5 m (15 ft) above the ground. The usual clutch size is two or three eggs. The incubation period is 16 to 17 days and fledging usually occurs 14 to 15 days after hatch. Details of parental care are not known.

=== Vocalization ===
The Tumbesian tyrannulet's dawn song is "a grating, harsh dzzree-dzzree'DJEE". Its calls are "various explosive, sneezy, buzzy sounds: DZEEK! or dzz-CHEW! and a harsh growl".

== Status ==
The IUCN follows HBW taxonomy and so has not separately assessed the Tumbesian and Maranon tyrannulets. The combined taxon is assessed as of Least Concern with no immediate threats identified. The Tumbesian tyrannulet is known from several protected areas in both countries. It "might presumably benefit from some degree of deforestation and it is unlikely to be threatened in the future".
