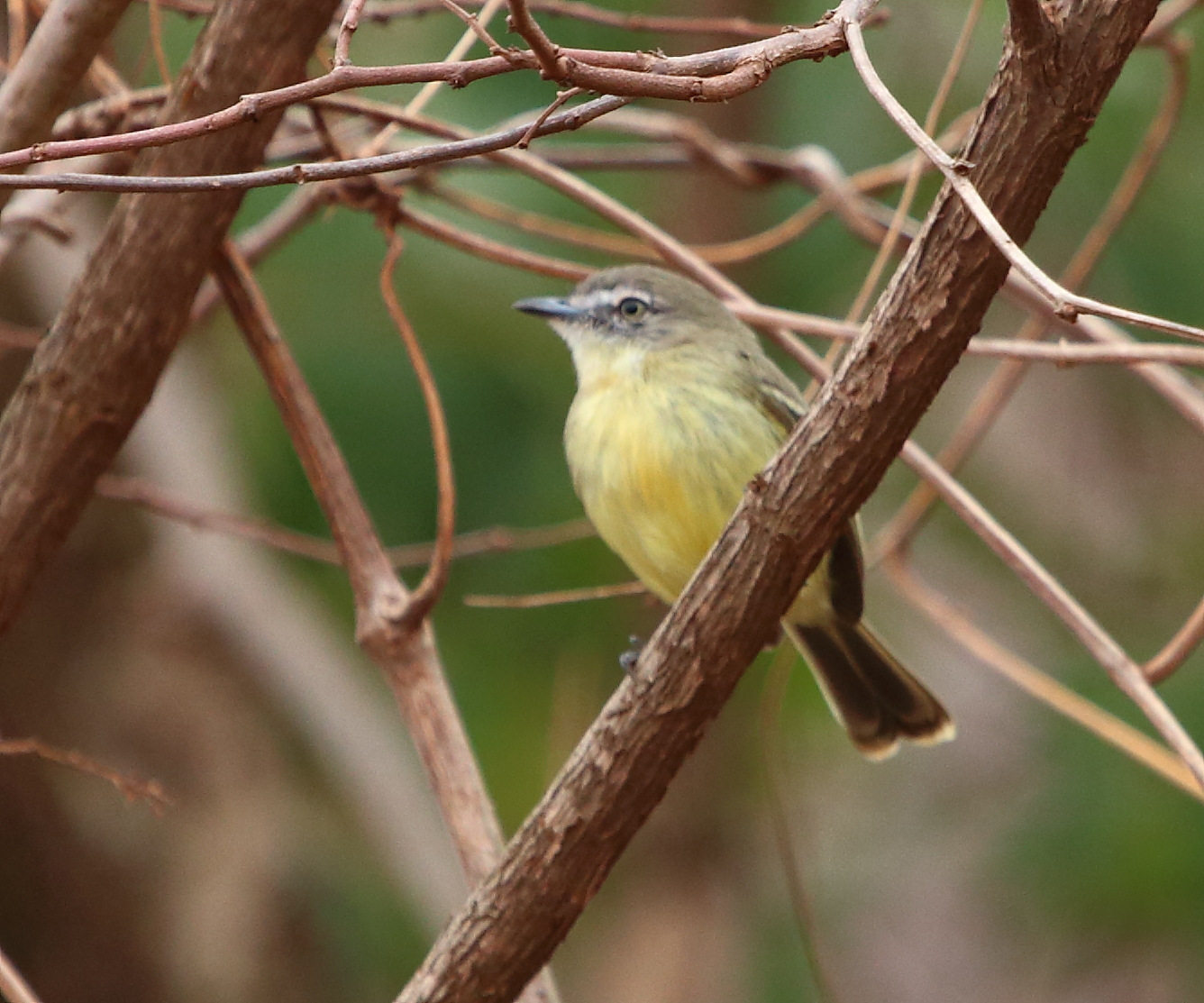

Conservation status
- Least Concern (IUCN 3.1)

Scientific classification
- Kingdom: Animalia
- Phylum: Chordata
- Class: Aves
- Order: Passeriformes
- Family: Tyrannidae
- Genus: Inezia
- Species: I. caudata

Binomial name
- Inezia caudata (Salvin, 1897)

= Pale-tipped inezia =

Species of bird

The pale-tipped inezia, or pale-tipped tyrannulet, (Inezia caudata) is a species of bird in the family Tyrannidae, the tyrant flycatchers. It is found in Brazil, Colombia, French Guiana, Guyana, Suriname, and Venezuela.

== Taxonomy and systematics ==
The pale-tipped inezia was originally described as Capsiempis caudata.

The pale-tipped inezia has two subspecies, the nominate I. c. caudata (Salvin, 1897) and I. c. intermedia (Cory, 1913). They and what are now the two subspecies of the Amazonian inezia (I. subflava) were combined as a species in the twentieth century. They were separated based on differences in their plumage and vocalizations that were detailed in a study published in 2000. Confusingly, the English name pale-tipped inezia (or tyrannulet) was originally applied to the four-subspecies I. subflava but at the split it was assigned to I. caudata.

== Description ==
The pale-tipped inezia is about 12 cm (4.7 in) long and weighs 7.5 to 10 g (0.26 to 0.35 oz). The sexes have the same plumage. Adults of the nominate subspecies have an olive-brown to grayish brown crown with a grayer forecrown and lower edge. Their face is mostly grayish with a white supercilium and broken white eye-ring that together look like spectacles. A dusky line passes through the eye. Their back and rump are olive-brown to grayish brown. Their wings are dusky with whitish to yellowish outer edges on the flight feathers and white tips of the wing coverts; the latter show as two wing bars. Their tail is dusky olive with whitish to pale ochraceous outer edges and tips to the feathers. Their chin is whitish and the rest of their underparts pale to bright yellow. The sides of their breast often have a dusky wash that resembles a vest, and sometimes their lower throat and breast's center have an ochracous wash. Subspecies I. c. intermedia has paler, more greenish olive upperparts than the nominate, with an olive wash on the breast, a whiter chin, a paler throat, and pure white lores. Both subspecies have a pale olive to yellowish white iris, a thin black bill, and gray to slate legs and feet.

== Distribution and habitat ==
The nominate subspecies of the pale-tipped inezia is found in the Llanos of northeastern Colombia through central and eastern Venezuela and the Guianas into the upper Branco River basin and extreme northern Amapá state of northern Brazil. Subspecies I. c. intermedia is found from the lower Magdalena River valley and Santa Marta region in northern Colombia east through northern Venezuela to northern Anzoátegui state. The species inhabits a variety of landscapes including deciduous and semi-deciduous woodlands, gallery forest, and shrubby areas with trees. In some areas it also is found in várzea forest and in the Guianas in mangroves. In most of its range it occurs at elevations between sea level and 400 m (1,300 ft) but reaches 450 m (1,500 ft) in Colombia.

== Behavior ==
=== Movement ===
The pale-tipped inezia is a year-round resident.

=== Feeding ===
The pale-tipped inezia feeds on arthropods. It typically forages alone or in pairs at all levels of the forest and has been observed feeding on the ground. It occasionally joins mixed-species feeding flocks. It takes prey from foliage and twigs by gleaning while perched and by briefly hovering after a short flight.

=== Breeding ===
The pale-tipped inezia is known to breed between January and July in Venezuela and Suriname but other records hint that it might breed in any month. Its nest is an open cup on a tree branch or in a fork, typically placed 1.7 to 2.5 m (6 to 8 ft) above the ground but sometimes higher. The clutch size, incubation period, time to fledging, and details of parental care are not known.

=== Vocalization ===
The pale-tipped inezia is "often quite vocal". Its song during the day is "a rather loud TEEP! tedede, or Teep, tee'r'r...or longer, descending TEEP! tee-de-dear". Its dawn song is similar "but faster and repeated over and over". Members of a pair often sing in duet. The species' calls include "an abbreviated pit note [and] pew or chew notes". The last two may be single or repeated up to about 15 times.

== Status ==
The IUCN has assessed the pale-tipped inezia as being of Least Concern. It has a large range; its population size is not known and is believed to be stable. No immediate threats have been identified. It is considered locally fairly common in Colombia and common in Venezuela. Its range includes many protected areas.
