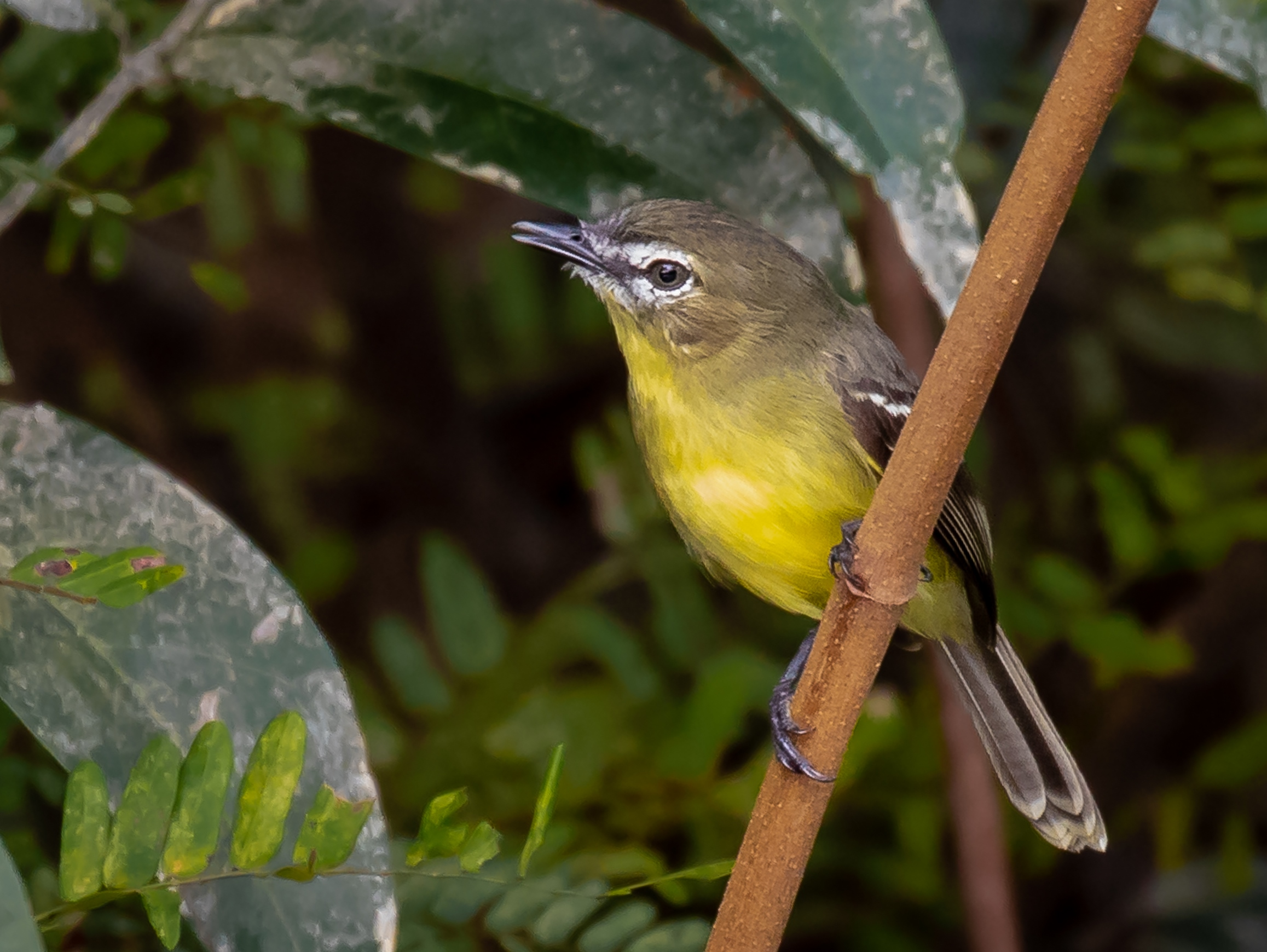

Conservation status
- Least Concern (IUCN 3.1)

Scientific classification
- Kingdom: Animalia
- Phylum: Chordata
- Class: Aves
- Order: Passeriformes
- Family: Tyrannidae
- Genus: Inezia
- Species: I. subflava

Binomial name
- Inezia subflava (Sclater, PL & Salvin, 1873)

= Amazonian inezia =

Species of bird

The Amazonian inezia, or Amazonian tyrannulet, (Inezia subflava) is a species of passerine bird in the family Tyrannidae, the tyrant flycatchers. It is found in Bolivia, Brazil, Colombia, and Venezuela.

== Taxonomy and systematics ==
The Amazonian inezia was originally described as Serpophaga subflava. Some early twentieth century authors later placed it in genus Capsiempis.

The Amazonian inezia has two subspecies, the nominate I. s. subflava (Sclater, PL & Salvin, 1873) and I. s. obscura (Zimmer, JT, 1939). The two subspecies of what is now I. caudata were previously considered subspecies of I. subflava all under the name pale-tipped inezia. They were separated based on differences in their plumage and vocalizations that were detailed in a study published in 2000. Confusingly, the English name pale-tipped inezia (or tyrannulet) that originally applied to the four-subspecies I. subflava was assigned to I. caudata.

== Description ==
The Amazonian inezia is about 12 cm (4.7 in) long and weighs 7 to 8 g (0.25 to 0.28 oz). The sexes have the same plumage. Adults of the nominate subspecies have a brownish olive to olive crown with a duskier lower edge. Their face is mostly olive to yellowish olive with a wide white supercilium, thin white broken eye-ring "spectacles", and a dusky line through the eye. Their back and rump are brownish olive to olive. Their wings are dusky with white outer edges on the flight feathers and tips of the wing coverts; the latter show as two wing bars that sometimes appear as rows of spots. Their tail is dusky olive with whitish outer edges and tips to the feathers. Their chin is whitish and the rest of their underparts pale to bright yellow. The sides of their breast often have a dusky wash that resembles a vest. Subspecies I. s. obscura is slightly larger than the nominate, with much darker and browner upperparts and duller yellow underparts. The shading on the sides of the breast is wider and darker. Both subspecies have a pale grayish olive iris, a thin black bill, and gray to slate legs and feet.

== Distribution and habitat ==
The Amazonian inezia has a disjunct distribution. The nominate subspecies has two separate ranges. One is along the border of extreme northern Bolivia and Brazil. The other is along the Amazon River from the lower Negro River east to the Atlantic in Pará and on the lower Madeira River. It probably also occurs in much of the rest of the Brazilian Amazon Basin. Subspecies I. s. obscura is found from southern Venezuela's Amazonas state and Colombia's eastern Guainía and Vaupés departments east into northwestern Brazil to the upper Negro River. The species is almost always associated with water. It occurs in shrubby areas along watercourses, in swamp forest, and in várzea forest. In elevation it ranges from sea level to about 200 m (650 ft).

== Behavior ==
=== Movement ===
The Amazonian inezia is a year-round resident.

=== Feeding ===
The Amazonian inezia feeds on arthropods. It typically forages alone or in pairs, usually in dense vegetation between about 1 and 3 m (3 and 10 ft) above the ground, and usually with its tail cocked up. It takes prey from foliage and twigs by gleaning while perched and by briefly hovering after a short flight.

=== Breeding ===
The Amazonian inezia's breeding season has not been fully defined but is known to span at least from May to October in Brazil. Its nest is a small cup of grass attached deep in a shrub with spider web. The clutch is one or two eggs; both parents incubate. The incubation period, time to fledging, and other details of parental care are not known.

=== Vocalization ===
What is thought to be the male Amazonian inezia's song is a "clear double note which is repeated several times at a pace of about 1.2‒1.7/s: pee-chew..pee-chew..pee-chew...". The apparent female song is a "rattled double or triple note which is repeated several times at a pace of about 1.5‒2/s: kit-up..kit-up..kit-up.. or kit-tr-up..kit-tr-up..kit-tr-up..". Pairs often sing in duet. The species' "long call", which is seldom heard, is "3‒10 near-identical nasal downslurred notes introduced by a short note: pee-tyew-tyew-tyew-tyew-tyew". Its notes are more nasal and longer than those of the similar male song. It also makes a "short staccato pit!". the species mostly sings around dawn but also intermittently during the day.

== Status ==
The IUCN has assessed the Amazonian inezia as being of Least Concern. It has a large range; its population size is not known and is believed to be decreasing. No immediate threats have been identified. It is considered very local in Colombia and uncommon (and perhaps local) in Venezuela. Its range includes several large national parks and other protected areas.
