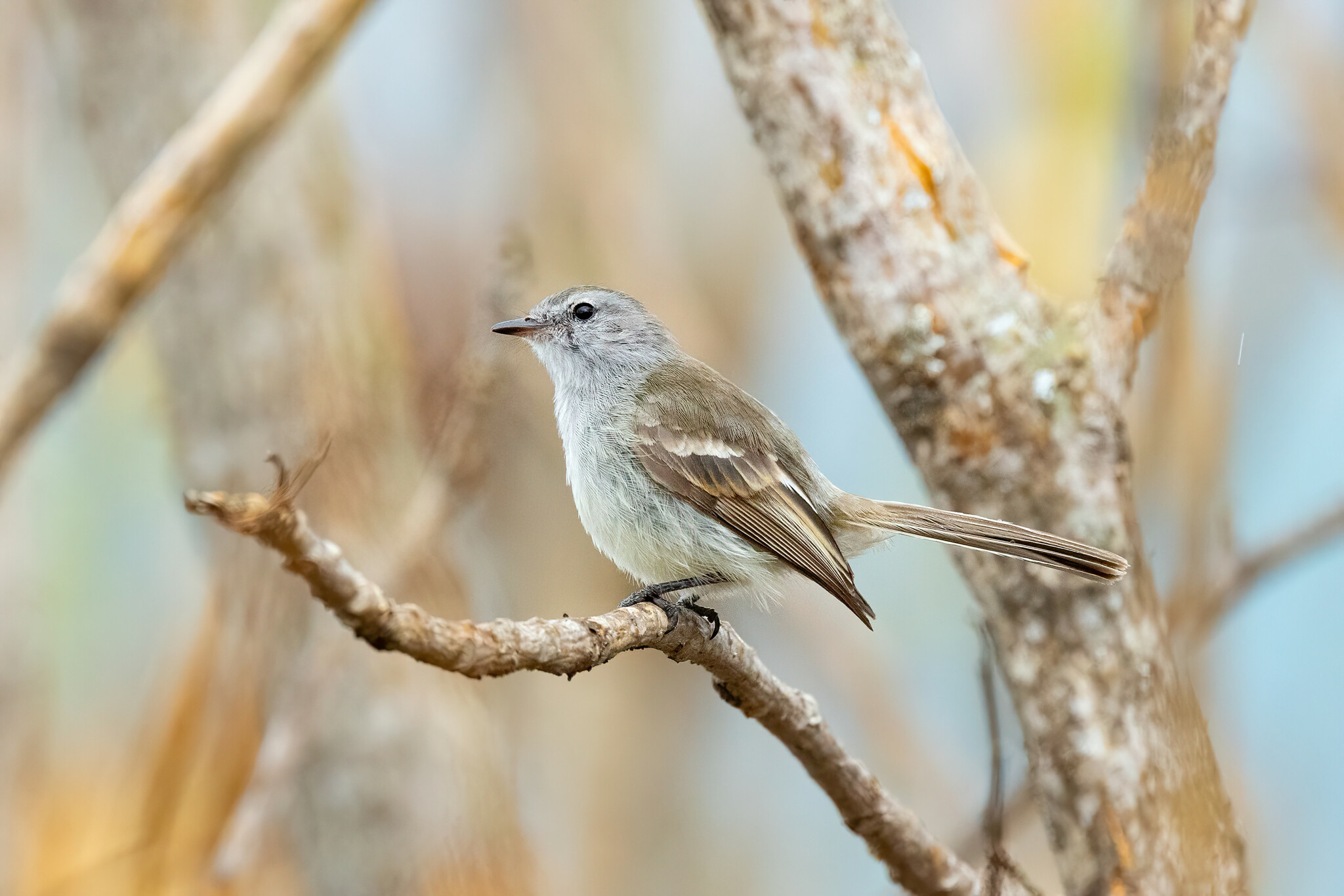

Scientific classification
- Kingdom: Animalia
- Phylum: Chordata
- Class: Aves
- Order: Passeriformes
- Family: Tyrannidae
- Genus: Nesotriccus
- Species: N. maranonicus

Binomial name
- Nesotriccus maranonicus (Zimmer, JT, 1941)

= Maranon tyrannulet =

Species of bird

The Maranon tyrannulet or Marañon tyrannulet (Nesotriccus maranonicus) is a species of bird in subfamily Elaeniinae of family Tyrannidae, the tyrant flycatchers. It is found in Ecuador and Peru.

== Taxonomy and systematics ==
What is now the Maranon tyrannulet was previously considered a subspecies of what was then the mouse-colored tyrannulet. The unsplit species bore the binomial Phaeomyias murina. Genetic analysis showed that Phaeomyias was embedded within Nesotriccus and by the principle of priority, beginning in 2018 most taxonomists moved the species to Nesotriccus. However, as of late 2024 BirdLife International's Handbook of the Birds of the World (HBW) retained the species in genus Phaeomyias.

Beyond the move to genus Nesotriccus the Maranon tyrannulet's taxonomy is unsettled. Based on multiple lines of evidence the mouse-colored tyrannulet was split into several species, one of which is the Maranon tyrannulet. The International Ornithological Committee (IOC) and the Clements taxonomy treat it as a monotypic species. However, HBW treats the taxon as a subspecies of the Tumbesian tyrannulet (N. tumbezanus).

== Description ==
The Maranon tyrannulet is about 12 cm (4.7 in) long. The sexes have the same plumage. Adults have a brownish gray head with an indistinct whitish supercilium. Their upperparts and tail are brownish gray. Their wings are dusky with buff tips on the coverts that show as two wing bars. Their throat, breast, and flanks are grayish and their belly yellowish. Both sexes have a dark brown iris, a stubby bill with whitish or pinkish at the base of the mandible, and blackish legs and feet.

== Distribution and habitat ==
The Maranon tyrannulet is listed by some sources as found only in the Marañón River valley in northern Peru's Amazonas, Cajamarca, and La Libertad departments. Other sources also include southern Ecuador's Loja Province. It inhabits arid scrublands and woodlands.

== Behavior ==
=== Movement ===
The Maranon tyrannulet is believed to be a year-round resident.

=== Feeding ===
As far as is known, the Maranon tyrannulet's diet and foraging behavior are the same as those of the southern mouse-colored tyrannulet, which see here.

=== Breeding ===
Nothing is known about the Maranon tyrannulet's breeding biology.

=== Vocalization ===
The Maranon tyrannulet's dawn song is "a scratchy, sneezy dji'dji'dji'dji DJZZEE! interspersed with a rising, buzzy dzzzrrrEEE?". Its call is "a sharp DJZZEE!".

== Status ==
The IUCN follows HBW taxonomy and so has not separately assessed the Maranon and Tumbesian tyrannulets. The combined taxon is assessed as of Least Concern with no immediate threats identified. It "may benefit from some limited degree of habitat modification, and it is unlikely to be threatened in the near future".
