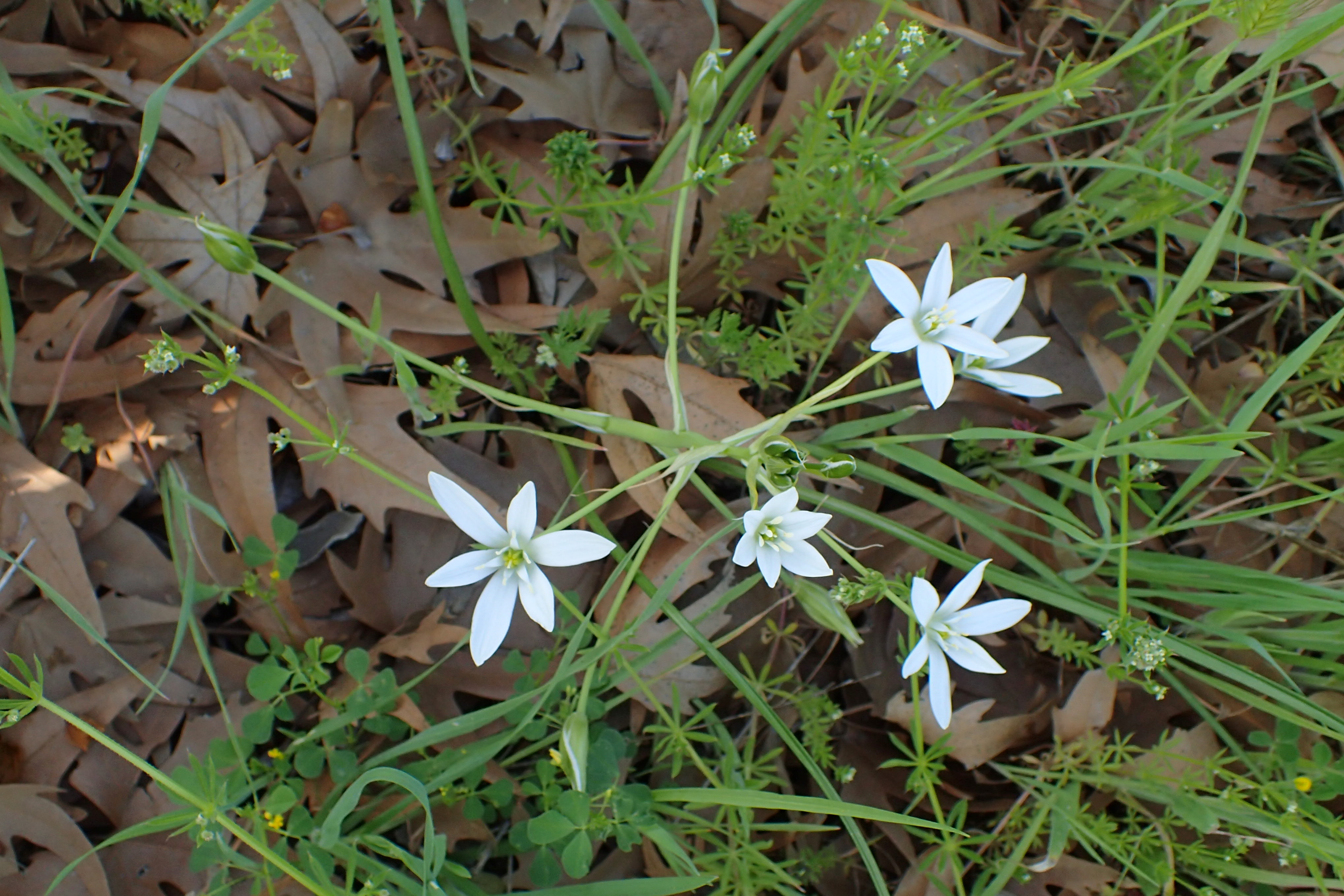
- In Cyprus
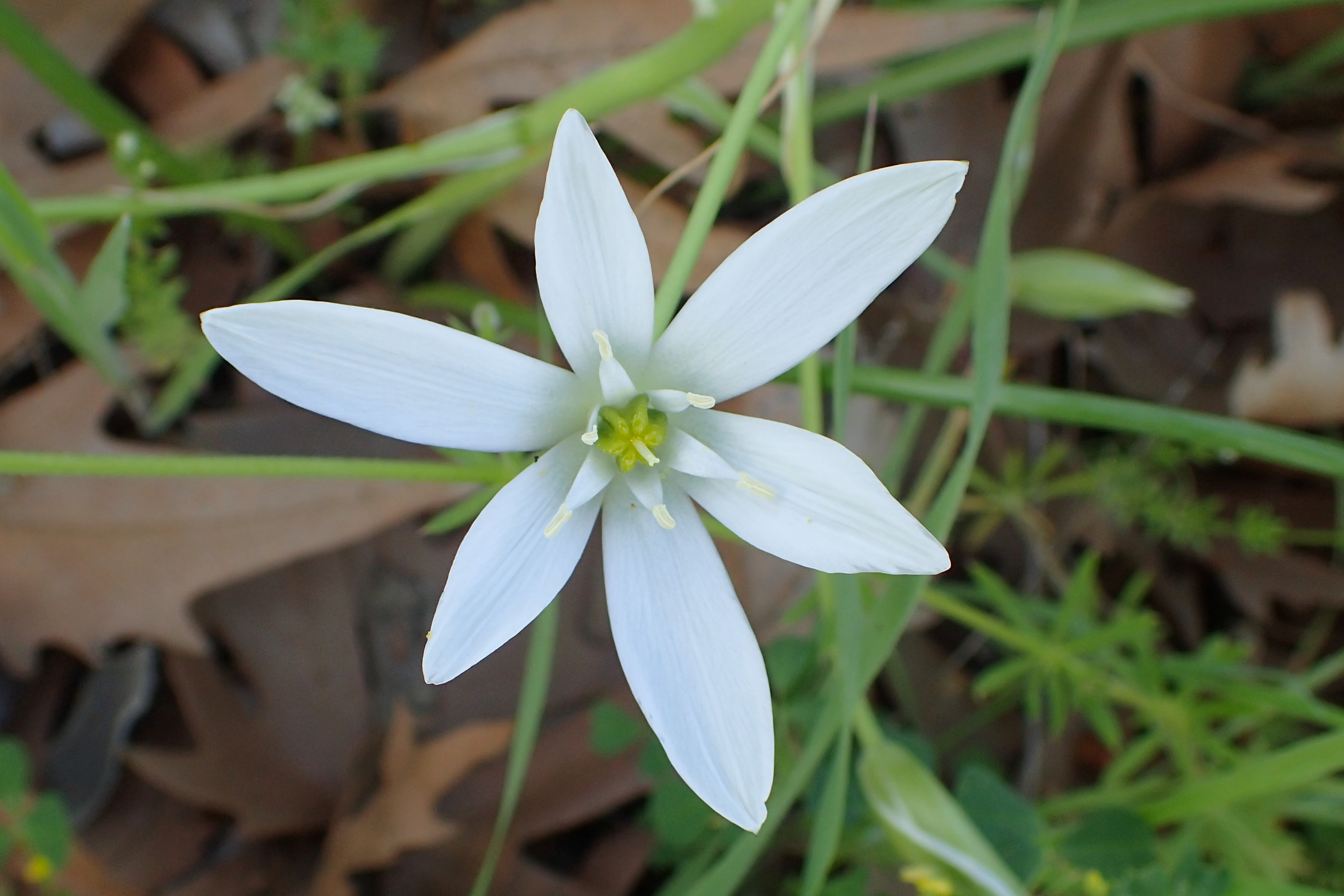
- Close-up of flower

Scientific classification
- Kingdom: Plantae
- Clade: Tracheophytes
- Clade: Angiosperms
- Clade: Monocots
- Order: Asparagales
- Family: Asparagaceae
- Subfamily: Scilloideae
- Genus: Ornithogalum
- Species: O. divergens

Binomial name
- Ornithogalum divergens Boreau

Synonyms
- List: Ornithogalum declinatum Jord. & Fourr.; Ornithogalum hortense (Neilr.) Jord. & Fourr.; Ornithogalum pater-familias Godr.; Ornithogalum proliferum Jord. & Fourr.; Ornithogalum refractum Guss.; Ornithogalum siculum Ucria; Ornithogalum umbellatum subsp. divergens (Boreau) Asch. & Graebn.; Ornithogalum umbellatum subsp. divergens (Boreau) Bonnier & Layens; Ornithogalum umbellatum subsp. pater-familias (Godr.) Asch. & Graebn.; Ornithogalum umbellatum subsp. paterfamilias (Godr.) Asch. & Graebn.

= Ornithogalum divergens =

Species of flowering plant

Ornithogalum divergens is a species of flowering plant in the star-of-Bethlehem genus Ornithogalum (family Asparagaceae). Native to central Europe and the Mediterranean region, it is characterised by its flattened, oval-shaped bulb surrounded by numerous small bulbils, linear green leaves with a white central stripe, and flat-topped clusters of white flowers with green stripes on the back of each petal. The plant typically grows in cultivated areas, disturbed habitats, and river valleys, often in sandy lowland soils. It represents the hexaploid form of the Ornithogalum umbellatum complex, having 54 chromosomes compared to the 27 chromosomes of the triploid O. umbellatum.

== Description ==
Ornithogalum divergens is characterised by a flattened, oval-shaped bulb surrounded by numerous small bulbils—tiny secondary bulbs measuring about 5 to 8 mm in diameter. These bulbils grow on slender stalks (2–8 mm long) and are typically leafless, though occasionally they may produce small, weak leaves. The main leaves of the plant are linear, narrowing gradually towards the tip, smooth, and coloured green with a distinct white stripe running down their central length.

The plant produces a broad, flat-topped cluster of flowers (known as a corymb), where the lower flower stalks (pedicels) are exceptionally long, spreading outwards or sometimes bending slightly downwards. Each flower is accompanied by small leafy structures (bracts) that are much shorter than the flower stalks beneath them, usually about half their length. The flowers themselves are relatively large, typically measuring between 35 and 45 mm across when fully open. Each flower has six elongated, white petals (tepals), usually about 23 to 28 mm long, each bearing a green stripe on the back.

The fruit of O. divergens is a capsule—an oval to slightly rounded seed pod measuring approximately 11–18 mm long and 7–13 mm wide. It has a truncated (flattened) top and is marked by six evenly spaced ribs or ridges.

== Habitat and distribution ==
Ornithogalum divergens typically grows in cultivated areas, disturbed habitats, and river valleys, often favouring sandy soils in lowland regions. It is widely distributed across southern Europe, extending eastward into western parts of the Middle East, and reaching northwards to Germany and the Netherlands. Additionally, scattered populations exist in central-western France and Portugal. Historical records from North Africa have not been recently confirmed and remain uncertain.

== Taxonomy ==
Ornithogalum divergens was first described by Alexandre Boreau in 1847, based on plants collected from various locations in the Loire Valley of central-northern France, the region also designated as the type locality for Ornithogalum umbellatum. Historically, O. divergens has been placed within the subgenus Ornithogalum (also referred to as subgenus Heliocharmos), a grouping characterised by inflorescences arranged in corymbs or pseudocorymbs, white tepals featuring a longitudinal green stripe on their underside, 6-ribbed capsules, and spherical seeds with a net-like (reticulate) surface.

Ornithogalum divergens is part of a complex involving multiple related taxa which are differentiated primarily through subtle morphological features and polyploidy (varying numbers of chromosome sets). It is commonly recognised as the hexaploid form (with 54 chromosomes) within the broader polyploid complex of O. umbellatum, distinguishing itself from the triploid cytotype (with 27 chromosomes), which typically represents O. umbellatum sensu stricto. Morphologically, O. divergens is characterised by its widely spread inflorescences with lower flower stalks that are long and either spread outward or slightly bent backwards, along with bulbs that produce numerous small, spherical bulbils attached by long stalks directly to the bulb base. These bulbils rarely bear leaves, differentiating O. divergens clearly from O. umbellatum, which generally has fewer, larger, leaf-bearing bulbils.

Several other taxa described in the 19th century, including Ornithogalum paterfamilias, O. hortense, O. declinatum, and O. proliferum, have since been synonymised with O. divergens due to their minimal morphological differences. The confusion in the taxonomy of these taxa largely stems from the subtle variations in flower and bulbil characteristics that have historically led to misidentifications and nomenclatural errors.

To stabilise its taxonomy, a lectotype for Ornithogalum divergens was designated from specimens collected near Angers (Maine-et-Loire, France) in May 1847, now housed at the ANG herbarium. Similarly, lectotypes or neotypes have been designated for related taxa such as O. paterfamilias, O. hortense, O. declinatum, and O. proliferum, consolidating their identities under O. divergens.

Chromosome studies confirm that although the species predominantly comprises hexaploid forms, tetraploid and pentaploid forms (with 36 and 45 chromosomes, respectively) also exist. Morphologically, pentaploids closely resemble hexaploids, while tetraploids have intermediate features between triploids and hexaploids. Due to these complex relationships, ongoing research and biosystematic analyses continue to refine the understanding and classification within this group.
