= Inezia (plant) =

Scientific classification
- Kingdom: Plantae
- Clade: Tracheophytes
- Clade: Angiosperms
- Clade: Eudicots
- Clade: Asterids
- Order: Asterales
- Family: Asteraceae
- Subfamily: Asteroideae
- Tribe: Anthemideae
- Genus: Inezia; E.Phillips

Type species
- Inezia integrifolia (Klatt) E.Phillips

Genus of flowering plants

Inezia is a genus of South African plants in the sunflower family.

== Etymology ==
The genus name honours Inez Clare Verdoorn (1896–1989), a South African taxonomist.

== Description ==
The species Inezia integrifolia was first described by Klatt as Lidbeckia integrifolia and occurs in Mpumalanga and Eswatini. It is described by Phillips as "a perennial herb with unbranched stems from a woody rootstock; leaves alternate, linear to lanceolate, punctate, pilose; heads solitary, terminal, peduncled."

Species

- Inezia integrifolia (Klatt) E.Phillips - Mpumalanga, Eswatini
- Inezia speciosa Brusse - Limpopo
