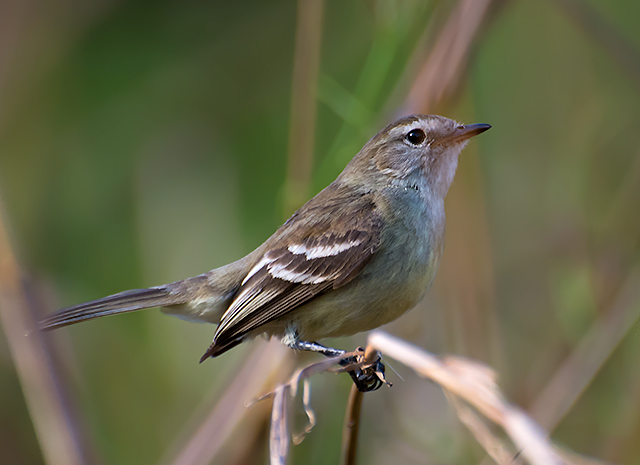
- Mouse-colored tyrannulet (Nesotriccus murinus)

Scientific classification
- Kingdom: Animalia
- Phylum: Chordata
- Class: Aves
- Order: Passeriformes
- Family: Tyrannidae
- Genus: Nesotriccus; Townsend, CH, 1895

Type species
- Nesotriccus ridgwayi C.H. Townsend, 1895

= Nesotriccus =

Genus of birds

Nesotriccus is a genus of Central and South American birds in the tyrant flycatcher family Tyrannidae.

== Taxonomy ==
The genus Nesotriccus was introduced in 1895 by the American zoologist Charles Haskins Townsend with Nesotriccus ridgwayi Townsend CH 1895, the Cocos tyrannulet as the type species. The genus name combines the Ancient Greek νησος/nēsos meaning "island" with the genus Triccus that had been introduced in 1846 by Jean Cabanis for a tody-tyrant.

== Species ==
The genus contains four species:

Image	Scientific name	Common name	Distribution
	Nesotriccus murinus	Mouse-colored tyrannulet	from Costa Rica and Panama south to Brazil and northern Argentina
	Nesotriccus ridgwayi	Cocos tyrannulet	Cocos Island
	Nesotriccus tumbezanus	Tumbesian tyrannulet	southwest Ecuador and northwest Peru
	Nesotriccus maranonicus	Maranon tyrannulet	northeastern Peru

The Tumbesian tyrannulet was formerly considered conspecific with the widespread mouse-colored tyrannulet. The two species are visually very similar, but vocally distinct.
