= Ornithogalum adseptentrionesvergentulum =

Scientific classification
- Kingdom: Plantae
- Clade: Embryophytes
- Clade: Tracheophytes
- Clade: Angiosperms
- Clade: Monocots
- Order: Asparagales
- Family: Asparagaceae
- Subfamily: Scilloideae
- Genus: Ornithogalum
- Species: O. adseptentrionesvergentulum

Binomial name
- Ornithogalum adseptentrionesvergentulum U.Müll.-Doblies & D.Müll.-Doblies

Synonyms
- Nicipe adseptentrionesvergentula (U.Müll.-Doblies & D.Müll.-Doblies) Mart.-Azorín, M.B.Crespo & Juan

Species of flowering plant

Ornithogalum adseptentrionesvergentulum is a species of flowering plant in the family Asparagaceae, native to the Cape Provinces of South Africa. This monocot from the Great Karoo desert is one of the world's smallest bulb species, under 3 cm (1.2 in) tall, and yet it has the longest valid plant name. The specific epithet means "inclined towards the north".
