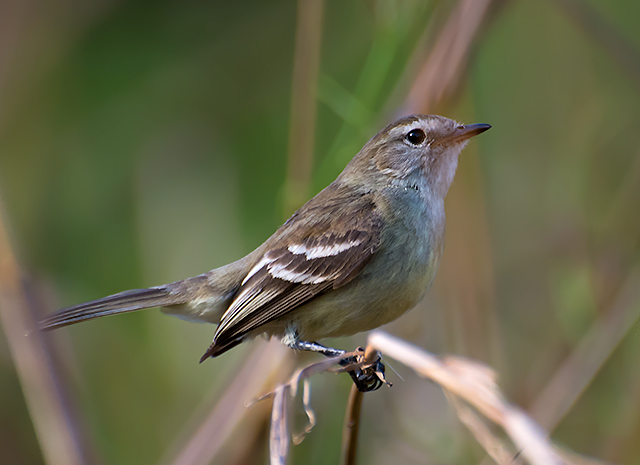
- At Piraju, São Paulo State, Brazil

Conservation status
- Least Concern (IUCN 3.1)

Scientific classification
- Kingdom: Animalia
- Phylum: Chordata
- Class: Aves
- Order: Passeriformes
- Family: Tyrannidae
- Genus: Nesotriccus
- Species: N. murinus

Binomial name
- Nesotriccus murinus (Spix, 1825)

Synonyms
- Platyrhynchus murinus (protonym); Phaeomyias murina

= Mouse-colored tyrannulet =

Species of bird

The mouse-colored tyrannulet (Nesotriccus murinus) is a species of bird in subfamily Elaeniinae of the tyrant flycatchers family Tyrannidae. It is found from Costa Rica and Panama south to Brazil and northern Argentina. The mouse-colored tyrannulet has sometimes been split into two species, the northern mouse-colored tyrannulet and the southern mouse-colored tyrannulet.

== Taxonomy and systematics ==
The mouse-colored tyrannulet was formally described in 1825 by the German naturalist Johann Baptist von Spix under the binomial name Platyrhynchus murinus based on a specimen from Brazil. The specific epithet is Modern Latin meaning "mouse-grey" from Latin murinus meaning "of mice". The type locality has been restricted to Juazeiro in the state of Bahia in eastern Brazil. The mouse-colored tyrannulet is now one of four species placed in the genus Nesotriccus that was introduced by Charles Haskins Townsend in 1895.

Four subspecies are recognised:

- N. m. eremonomus (Wetmore, 1953) – Pacific lowlands of south Costa Rica and Panama
- N. m. incomtus (Cabanis & Heine, 1860) – Colombia, northeast Ecuador, Venezuela, Trinidad and Guyana
- N. m. murinus (Spix, 1825) – central, east, south Brazil; central, south Bolivia, Paraguay, and northwest, northeast Argentina
- N. m. wagae (Taczanowski, 1884) – the Guianas, Amazonian Brazil, east Peru, and north Bolivia

The mouse-colored tyrannulet has sometimes been split into two species with the subspecies N. m. eremonomus and N. m. incomtus known as the northern mouse-colored tyrannulet and the subspecies N. m. murinus and N. m. wagae known as the southern mouse-colored tyrannulet.

The mouse-colored tyrannulet was formerly placed in the genus Phaeomyias. Genetic analysis showed that Nesotriccus was embedded within Phaeomyias making Phaeomyias paraphyletic and by the principle of priority, beginning in 2018 most taxonomists moved the species to Nesotriccus. Nesotriccus murinus formerly also included what are now the tumbesian tyrannulet (N. tumbezanus) and Maranon tyrannulet (N. maranonicus).

== Description ==
The mouse-colored tyrannulet is 10.5 to 12.5 cm (4.1 to 4.9 in) long and weighs about 7 to 12 g (0.25 to 0.42 oz). The sexes have the same plumage. Adults of the nominate subspecies have an olive-brown to gray-brown crown, a wide but ill-defined whitish to creamy supercilium, and a thin whitish eye ring on a face that is otherwise pale grayish white to white. Their upperparts are olive-brown to gray-brown. Their wings are dusky with wide whitish to dull cinnamon edges on the innermost flight feathers and tips on the coverts. Their tail is dusky. Their throat is pale grayish white to white. The center of their breast is whitish and the sides grayish, both with a pale olive wash. Their belly and undertail coverts are pale yellow. Juveniles are like adults. Subspecies N. m. wagae has less white on the throat, a darker green shade to its upperparts, and more intense yellow underparts than the nominate. Both sexes have a brown iris, a thick, rounded, horn-colored bill with pale pink at the base of the mandible, and gray legs and feet.

== Distribution and habitat ==
The mouse-colored tyrannulet is found from southern Costa Rica and Panama to Colombia, northeastern Ecuador, Venezuela, Trinidad, the Guianas and Amazonia to east Brazil, Paraguay and northwest Argentina. It inhabits a variety of open to semi-open landscapes, most of which are arid to only moderately humid. These include lowland and lower montane scrublands (especially those with Acacia and other loosely foliaged trees), cactus- and thorn scrub, cerrado, deciduous woodlands, gallery forest, young secondary forest, mangroves, parks, and gardens. In elevation it overall ranges from sea level up to 2,400 m (7,900 ft) but mostly occurs below 1,000 m (3,300 ft) and reaches only 500 m (1,600 ft) in Peru.

== Behavior ==
=== Movement ===
The southern mouse-colored tyrannulet is found year-round in the Amazon Basin. In northern Bolivia it migrates from higher to lower elevation after the breeding season. The populations in southern Brazil, southern Bolivia, Argentina, and Paraguay move north after breeding, apparently into the Amazon Basin.

=== Feeding ===
Most of the data on the southern mouse-colored tyrannulet's diet and foraging behavior are from studies of the pre-split mouse-colored tyrannulet, and it is not certain how much of it applies to this species. As best is known, it primarily feeds on insects though fruits of mistletoe (Loranthaceae) and some other plants are a significant part of its diet. It usually forages singly or in pairs and only occasionally joins mixed-species feeding flocks. It tends to feed in dense foliage between about 2 and 8 m (7 and 26 ft) above the ground. It usually takes food by hover-gleaning and jumping up from a perch but also feeds by gleaning while perched.

=== Breeding ===
The southern mouse-colored tyrannulet's breeding season varies geographically but is not fully understood. It appears to breed between October and December in Argentina and eastern Amazonian Brazil, between December and April in northeastern Brazil, and in at least January and February in eastern Bolivia. As with the data on feeding, breeding data are from the mouse-colored tyrannulet; as far as is known the data apply to both the northern and southern species. The female alone builds the nest, an open cup of plant fibers and roots, grasses, mosses, and spider web with feathers in the structure and as a lining. It is typically placed in a branch fork or tree crotch within about 4 m (13 ft) of the ground, though occasionally higher. The clutch size is two eggs; the female alone incubates. The incubation period is 14 to 17 days and fledging occurs about 17 days after hatch. Both parents provision nestlings.

=== Vocalization ===
The mouse-colored tyrannulet's dawn song is a "short husky phrase of some 3‒5 notes which is repeated for a long period rwee-chee-chew....tsee-rwee-chee-chew.....rwee-chee-chew...". Its day song is a "rising series of buzzy notes that increase in amplitude till the last few notes, which are variable in pitch and amplitude chu-chu-chu-chu-chu-chee!-chu-chew". It also makes a nasal "tjew-tjew-tju.....tjew-tjew-tee-tju...." call, "fainter short buzzy notes", and "emphatic pip notes".

== Conservation status ==
The International Union for Conservation of Nature (IUCN) judges that the species is of Least concern as it has an extremely large range and although the population size has not been quantified, it is not believed to be rapidly decreasing.
