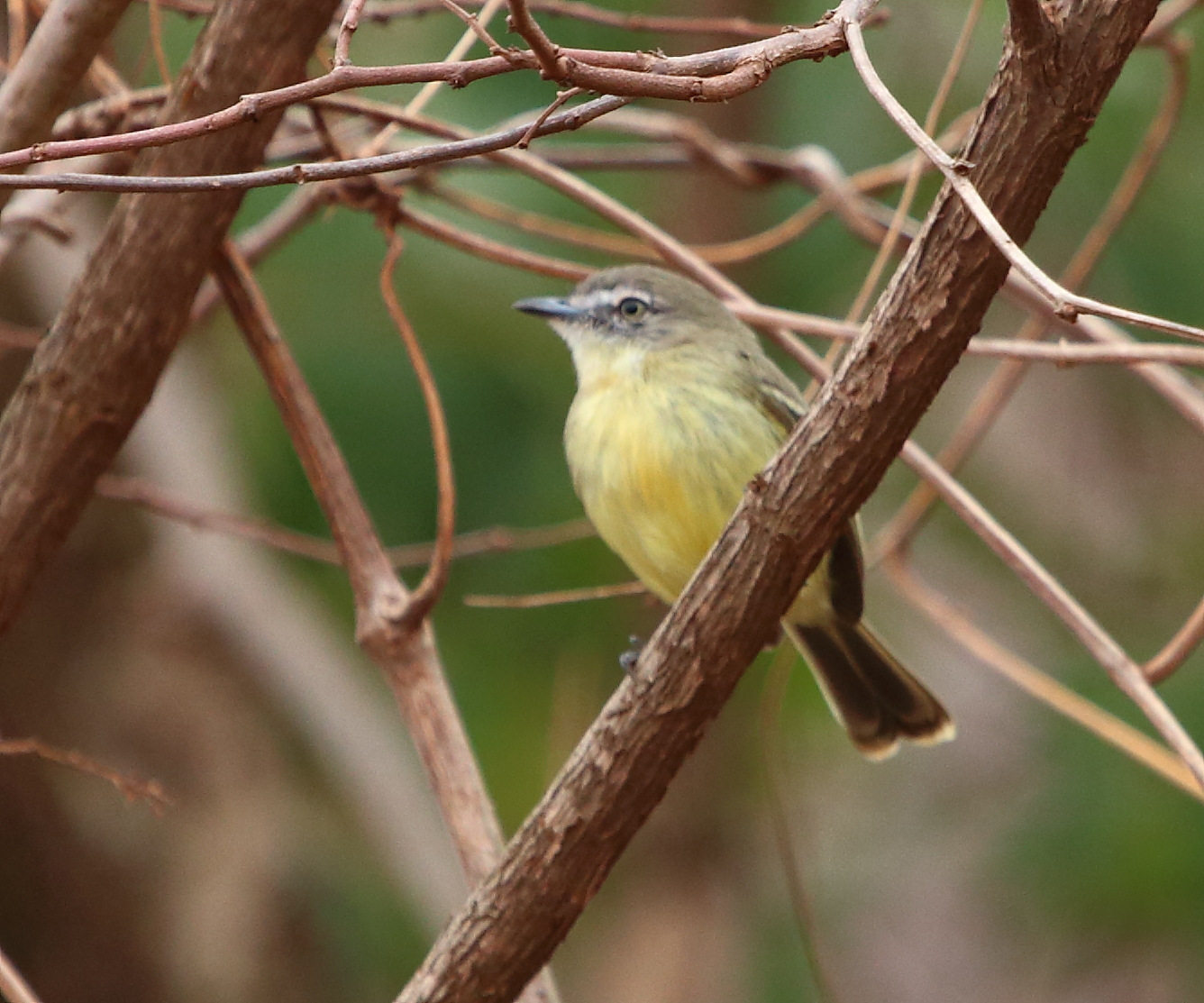

Scientific classification
- Kingdom: Animalia
- Phylum: Chordata
- Class: Aves
- Order: Passeriformes
- Family: Tyrannidae
- Genus: Inezia; Cherrie, 1909

Type species
- Capsiempis caudata Salvin, 1897

= Inezia (bird) =

Genus of birds

Inezia is a genus of birds in the tyrant-flycatcher family Tyrannidae.

== Species ==
It contains the following species:

Genus Inezia – Cherrie, 1909 – four species
Common name	Scientific name and subspecies	Range	Size and ecology	IUCN status and estimated population
Slender-billed inezia	Inezia tenuirostris (Cory, 1913)	Northeastern Colombia and Northwestern Venezuela	Size: Habitat: Diet:	LC
Plain inezia	Inezia inornata (Salvadori, 1897)	Argentina, Bolivia, Brazil, Paraguay, and Peru.	Size: Habitat: Diet:	LC
Amazonian inezia	Inezia subflava (Sclater, PL & Salvin, 1873)	Bolivia, Brazil, Colombia, and Venezuela.	Size: Habitat: Diet:	LC
Pale-tipped inezia	Inezia caudata (Salvin, 1897)	Brazil, Colombia, French Guiana, Guyana, Suriname, and Venezuela.	Size: Habitat: Diet:	LC
