= Ornithogalum libanoticum =

Conservation status
- Endangered (IUCN 3.1)

Scientific classification
- Kingdom: Plantae
- Clade: Embryophytes
- Clade: Tracheophytes
- Clade: Angiosperms
- Clade: Monocots
- Order: Asparagales
- Family: Asparagaceae
- Subfamily: Scilloideae
- Genus: Ornithogalum
- Species: O. libanoticum

Binomial name
- Ornithogalum libanoticum Boiss.

Synonyms
- Honorius libanoticus (Boiss.) Holub

Species of flowering plant

Ornithogalum libanoticum, or Lebanon ornithogalum, is a species of Ornithogalum in the subfamily Scilloideae of family Asparagaceae.

== Description ==
The plant grows 50 to 80 centimetres (20 to 31 in) tall from an oval bulb. Leaves are glabrous, measuring around 2.5 centimetres (0.98 in) wide; they are lanceolate and acute, and grow shorter or equal in length to the erect flower stem. The white flowers are born in April and May on simple racemes in an inflorescence of 10 to 20 flowers. Highly acuminate bracts attach to short pedicels measuring 5 to 6 millimetres (0.20 to 0.24 in) long. Bell-shaped, 2 to 2.5 centimetres (0.79 to 0.98 in) long perianth. It has linear, lanceolate, obtuse and subacute clear white tepals. The backside of the tepals is marked by a single green or brown band. The fruit is a six-side oval capsule.

== Distribution and habitat ==
The plant is endemic to Lebanon and Syria, It favors rocky terrain.
