= Ornithogalum lebaense =

Scientific classification
- Kingdom: Plantae
- Clade: Tracheophytes
- Clade: Angiosperms
- Clade: Monocots
- Order: Asparagales
- Family: Asparagaceae
- Subfamily: Scilloideae
- Genus: Ornithogalum
- Species: O. lebaense

Binomial name
- Ornithogalum lebaense van Jaarsv.

Species of flowering plant

Ornithogalum lebaense is a flowering plant that grows in southwest Angola. It was discovered in January 2009 by Ernst Jacobus van Jaarsveld. The word "lebaense" refers to Leba Pass, where the plant lives. O. lebaense does not have a known common name, most likely because its habitat is not one that is easily accessible by local people. There are three other Ornithogalum species identified in Angola: Ornithogalum tenuifolium, O. pulchrum and O. benguellens.

== Distribution ==
Ornithogalum lebaense is an obligatory cremnophyte that grows on steep cliffs in the Serra de Chela escarpment, an Angolan mountain range. O. lebaense grows 1800 meters above sea level in Leba Pass.

== Habitat and ecology ==
Ornithogalum lebaense is often found growing with Aloe mendesii, a plant that is also an obligatory cremnophyte of the area. O. lebaense flowers in the winter and is also winter deciduous. Winters in the subtropical Serra de Chela last from June until August and are mild, without frost. While this plant grows in the wild, it also grows well if cultivated in the right conditions. The plant prefers sandy soil with low mineral content, and organic fertilizer. It does best with no water in the winter.

== Morphology ==
O. lebaense's bulbs, long leaves; and short, white, cone-shaped inflorescence grow pendent. This is the main characteristic which sets O. lebaense apart from other Ornithogalum species. Each plant has four or five semi-succulent leaves that curve in a spiral, and one or two inflorescences. The inflorescence is usually between 200 mm and 300 mm long, with clearly visible bracts. The flowers have a sweet scent, and both the flowers and pollen are white. The stamens are 8 mm long with white filaments. The style matures up to 5 mm long. The ovary is a yellow-green color. The seeds are black, with a shiny epidermis and an angular shape.

== Pollination and dispersion ==
Ornithogalum lebaense is pollinated by insects. Its flowers are usually in bloom for thirty to forty-five days, and will abort if they are not fertilized. The seeds are wind-dispersed in the spring, which starts in September. In late spring (November), the plant acquires its glaucous leaves. Beginning in August (early spring), the fruiting capsules start to ripen, until the black seeds inside are finally wind-dispersed.
