= Ornithogalum gabrielianiae =

Conservation status
- Critically Endangered (IUCN 3.1)

Scientific classification
- Kingdom: Plantae
- Clade: Tracheophytes
- Clade: Angiosperms
- Clade: Monocots
- Order: Asparagales
- Family: Asparagaceae
- Subfamily: Scilloideae
- Tribe: Ornithogaleae
- Genus: Ornithogalum
- Species: O. gabrielianiae

Binomial name
- Ornithogalum gabrielianiae Agapova

Species of plant

Ornithogalum gabrielianiae, commonly known as the Gabrielyan's starflowers, is a flowering plant in the family Asparagaceae. It is endemic to Armenia.

It is classified as critically endangered by the International Union for Conservation of Nature.

== Distribution ==
It is found in Armenia.

== Taxonomy ==
It was described by Natalija Agapova, in Willdenowia 27: 199. in 1997.
