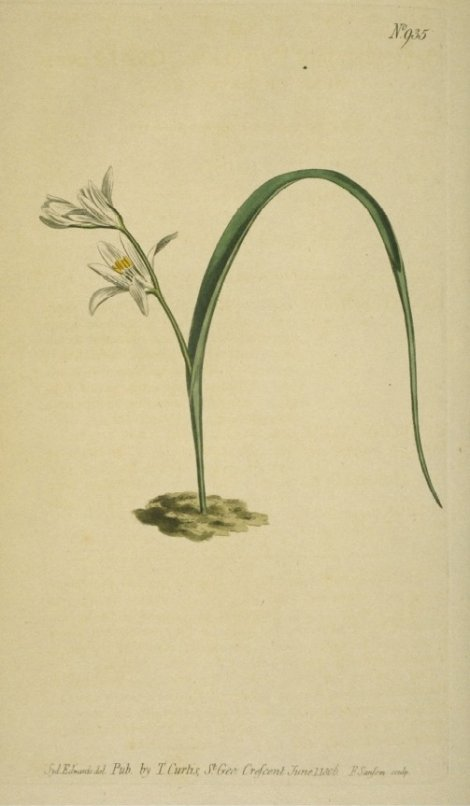

Conservation status
- Least Concern (IUCN 3.1)

Scientific classification
- Kingdom: Plantae
- Clade: Embryophytes
- Clade: Tracheophytes
- Clade: Angiosperms
- Clade: Monocots
- Order: Asparagales
- Family: Asparagaceae
- Subfamily: Scilloideae
- Genus: Ornithogalum
- Species: O. broteroi

Binomial name
- Ornithogalum broteroi M.Lainz

Synonyms
- List: Cathissa broteroi (M.Laínz) Speta; Cathissa unifolia (L.) Mart.-Azorín, M.B.Crespo & Juan; Ornithogalum nanum Brot.; Ornithogalum spicatum Planellas; Ornithogalum unifolium (L.) Ker Gawl.; Scilla unifolia L.

= Ornithogalum broteroi =

Species of flowering plant

Ornithogalum broteroi, a species of the genus Ornithogalum, is a perennial bulbous flowering plant in the asparagus family (Asparagaceae). It is classed in the Cathissa group of the genus. It bears white flowers and usually a single leaf. It is found in open woods and pastures in the western part of the Iberian Peninsula and also Morocco.

== Description ==
Ornithogalum broteroi shares a number of features with the other two members of the Cathissa group, namely spicate to subspicate (spiked) inflorescences and corolla segments that lack conspicuous green stripes on the reverse surface.

O. broteroi is characterised by scapes that have a single leaf, which are usually single but occasionally two–three. The plant arises from a bulb, that is about 8–12 mm in diametre, and reaches a height of 2–10 cm (0.8–3.9 in), occasionally up to 25 cm (9.8 in).

The leaves, which are 5–15 cm (2.0–5.9 in) in length and 2–6.5 mm wide, are lanceolate and glabrous with a wide sheath at the base, then tapering to an appendage that is cuspidate and cylindrical and nearly as long as the leaf blade. The short pedicels are 1.5–3 mm (but may be up to 4 mm) long, while the much longer bracts are 8–10 mm long. The inflorescence typically has 3-5 (sometimes 8) flowers, and has perianth segments that are 10–16 mm long and white. The ovary, which is rounded at the apex (obovate-lanceolate to obtusely truncate apex) is up to two times longer than it is wide, and the style is longer than it. The fruit is a capsule, oblong to ovoid in shape. The seeds, which are 1.6–1.9 mm long are subglobose, with one pointed edge, and have a seed coat that is made up of numerous irregular pieces delimited by ridges.

Chromosome number: 2n=34

== Taxonomy ==
Ornithogalum broteroi has a complicated history. Known at least, to Theophrastus and Clusius, the species was first formally described by Carl Linnaeus in 1753, as Scilla unifolium, one of eight Scilla species. This was his name for a plant from Portugal previously known as Bulbus monophphyllus, flore albo. Subsequently (1799) Link reclassified it in the related genus Ornithogalum, as O. unifolium, which was an illegitimate combination. It was fully described and illustrated under that name in 1806 by Ker Gawler (two specimens) in Sims' Botanical Magazine, and it is still referred to by that name in some texts. The Portuguese botanist Félix de Avelar Brotero had also renamed it as O. nanum, but this too was shown to be illegitimate, there being pre-existing homonyms for both, and also the alternative O. spicatum Planellas. the only legitimate name is Ornithogalum broteroi, proposed by M. Lainz in 1971, and consequently bears his name as the botanical authority.

The infrageneric relationships (and hence the phylogeny) of Ornithogalum has been controversial. Briefly The sensu stricto classification of Martinez-Azorin et al. (2011) reduces the number of species to 50 as originally proposed by Speta. Thus, any consideration of the genus needs to be examined as to whether it refers to sensu stricto, the 50 species considered by Speta (1998) and Martinez-Azorin et al. (2011), or sensu lato, the much larger genus envisaged by Manning et al. (2009). Under the sensu stricto construction, O. broteroi and two other species (O. concinnum Salisb. and O. reverchonii Lange) are segregated to a separate genus, Cathissa Salisb. and is designated Cathissa broteroi (M.Laínz) Speta. Under the sensu lato construction Cathissa is treated as a subgenus of Ornithogalum (subg. Cathissa (Salisb.) Baker.

=== Etymology ===
The specific epithet broteroi recognises the contribution of Félix de Avelar Brotero.

== Distribution and habitat ==
Littoral areas of the Western Iberian Peninsula, from northern Cabo de Finisterre, and along the coast of Portugal to Gibraltar and in some parts inland to the Spanish border and northwestern Morocco to Marrakech. It is found in open woods and pastures.

== Ecology ==
Flowering time is February to March.

== Bibliography ==
=== Books ===
- Bauhin, Johann; Cherler, Johann Heinrich (1650–1651). "Bulbus monophyllos". Historia plantarvm vniuersalis, nova, et absolvtissima: cvm consensv et dissensv circa eas. 3 vols (in Latin). Vol. ii. Yverdon. pp. 622–623.
- Brotero, Félix de Avellar (1804). "Ornithogalum nanum". Flora lusitanica, seu, Plantarum, quae in Lusitania vel sponte crescunt, vel frequentius coluntur, ex florum praesertim sexubus systematice distributarum, synopsis. 2 vols (in Latin). Lisbon. p. ii 529.
- Kubitzki, K., ed. (1998). The families and genera of vascular plants. Vol.3 Monocotyledons: Lilianae (except Orchidaceae). Berlin, Germany: Springer-Verlag. ISBN 978-3-540-64060-8.
- Linnaeus, Carl (1753). "Scilla". Species Plantarum: exhibentes plantas rite cognitas, ad genera relatas, cum differentiis specificis, nominibus trivialibus, synonymis selectis, locis natalibus, secundum systema sexuale digestas. Vol. 1. Stockholm: Impensis Laurentii Salvii. pp. 308–309., see also Species Plantarum
- Tutin, T. G.; Heywood, V H; Burges, N. A.; Moore, D. M.; Valentine, D. H.; Walters, S. M.; Webb, D. A., eds. (1980). "Ornithogalum unifolium". Flora Europaea. Volume 5, Alismataceae to Orchidaceae (monocotyledones). Cambridge, England: Cambridge University Press. p. 40. ISBN 0-521-20108-X. (available here at Internet Archive; see also Flora Europaea)
- Speta, F. "Hyacinthaceae". In Kubitzki (1998), pp. 261–285.

=== Articles ===
- Lainz, Manuel [in Spanish] (November 1971). "Aportaciones al conocimiento de la flora gallega, VII: Ornithogalum broteroi". Nova Acta Científica Compostelana, Bioloxía: 30.(see Talk)
- Link, Johann Heinrich Friedrich (1799). "Nachricht von einer Reise nach Portugal nebst botanischen Bemerkungen. In einem Schreiben an den Herausgeber von dem Hrn. Prof. Link". Journal für die Botanik (Schrader). 2: 297–326.
- Manning JC, Forest F, Devey DS, Fay MF, Goldblatt P (2009). "A molecular phylogeny and a revised classification of Ornithogaloideae (Hyacinthaceae) based on an analysis of four placid DNA regions". Taxon. 58 (1): 77–107. doi:10.1002/tax.581011. JSTOR 27756826.
- Martínez-Azorín, Mario; Crespo, Manuel B.; Spencer, Mark (November 2006). "Typification of names of taxa in Ornithogalum L. subg. Cathissa (Salisb.) Baker ( Hyacinthaceae )". Taxon. 55 (4): 1014–1018. doi:10.2307/25065699. JSTOR 25065699.
- Martinez-Azorin, Mario; Crespo, Manuel B.; Juan, Ana; Fay, Michael F. (2011). "Molecular phylogenetics of subfamily Ornithogaloideae (Hyacinthaceae) based on nuclear and plastid DNA regions, including a new taxonomic arrangement". Annals of Botany. 107 (1): 1–37. doi:10.1093/aob/mcq207. PMC 3002468. PMID 21163815.
- Sims, John (1806a). "Ornithogalum unifolium: One-leaved Star of Bethlehem". Curtis's Botanical Magazine. 23. Ker Gawler (text); Sydenham Edwards (illustrator); Francis Sansom (engraver): 935.
- Sims, John (1806b). "Ornithogalum unifolium (β): Gibraltar Star of Bethlehem". Curtis's Botanical Magazine. 23. Ker Gawler (text);Sydenham Edwards (illustrator); Francis Sansom (engraver): 953.

=== Websites ===
- POWO (2022). "Ornithogalum broteroi M.Laínz". Plants of the World Online. Royal Botanic Gardens, Kew.
