= Inez Clare Verdoorn =

South African botanist (1896–1989)

- Born: 15 June 1896; Pretoria, South African Republic
- Died: 2 April 1989 (aged 92)
- Known for: Major revisions of plant families and genera
- Scientific career
- Fields: Botany, taxonomy
- Institutions: Royal Botanic Gardens, Kew
- Author abbrev. (botany): I.Verd.

Inez Clare Verdoorn (15 June 1896 – 2 April 1989) was a South African botanist and taxonomist, noted for her major revisions of plant families and genera. She is also a niece of Eugène Nielen Marais, lawyer, naturalist, poet and writer.

She matriculated in 1916 from Loreto Convent School in Pretoria, worked for a while in the office of the Controller and Auditor General before being appointed in 1917 as a herbarium assistant at the Division of Botany and Plant Pathology. Between 1925 and 1927 she worked at Kew as liaison officer for the National Herbarium. On her return to Pretoria, she assumed charge of the herbarium and was promoted to Senior Professional Officer in 1944. Despite having arrived at retirement age in 1951, Verdoorn opted to work on as a temporary staff member until 1968, and thereafter as an unpaid research worker.

She has more than 200 botanical publications to her credit, including major revisions, appearing mainly in Bothalia, Flowering Plants of Africa, Flora of Southern Africa, Kew Bulletin, and the Journal of South African Botany.

This botanist is denoted by the author abbreviation I.Verd. when citing a botanical name.

== Honours and fellowships ==
- 1952 Senior Capt. Scott Medal by the SA Biological Society
- 1957 President of the SA Biological Society
- 1964 President of Section B of the SA Association for the Advancement of Science
- 1967 PhD (honorary) from the University of Natal

She is commemorated by the Composite genus Inezia Phill., Aloe verdoorniae Reynolds, Senecio verdoorniae R.A.Dyer, Teclea verdoorniana Exell & Mendonça, and also Volume 28 of the book, Flowering Plants of Africa, which was specially dedicated to her.

Her collected specimens total some 4000. Many were collected with Leslie Edward Wostall Codd, Robert Allen Dyer, Anna Amelia Obermeyer and Herold Georg Wilhelm Johannes Schweickerdt.
