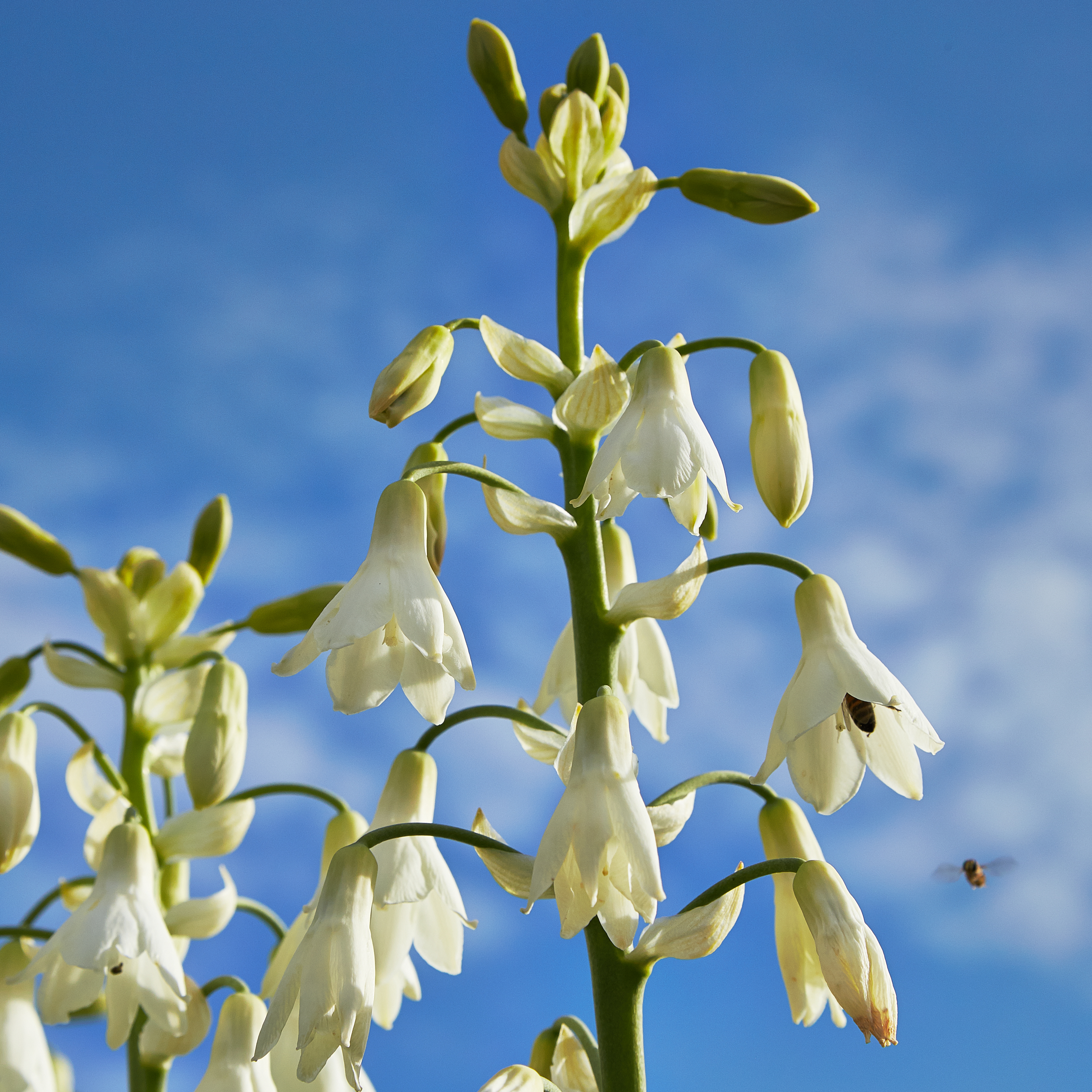

Scientific classification
- Kingdom: Plantae
- Clade: Tracheophytes
- Clade: Angiosperms
- Clade: Monocots
- Order: Asparagales
- Family: Asparagaceae
- Subfamily: Scilloideae
- Genus: Ornithogalum
- Species: O. candicans

Binomial name
- Ornithogalum candicans (Baker) J.C.Manning & Goldblatt

Synonyms
- Galtonia candicans (Baker) Decne.; Hyacinthus candicans Baker

= Ornithogalum candicans =

Species of plant

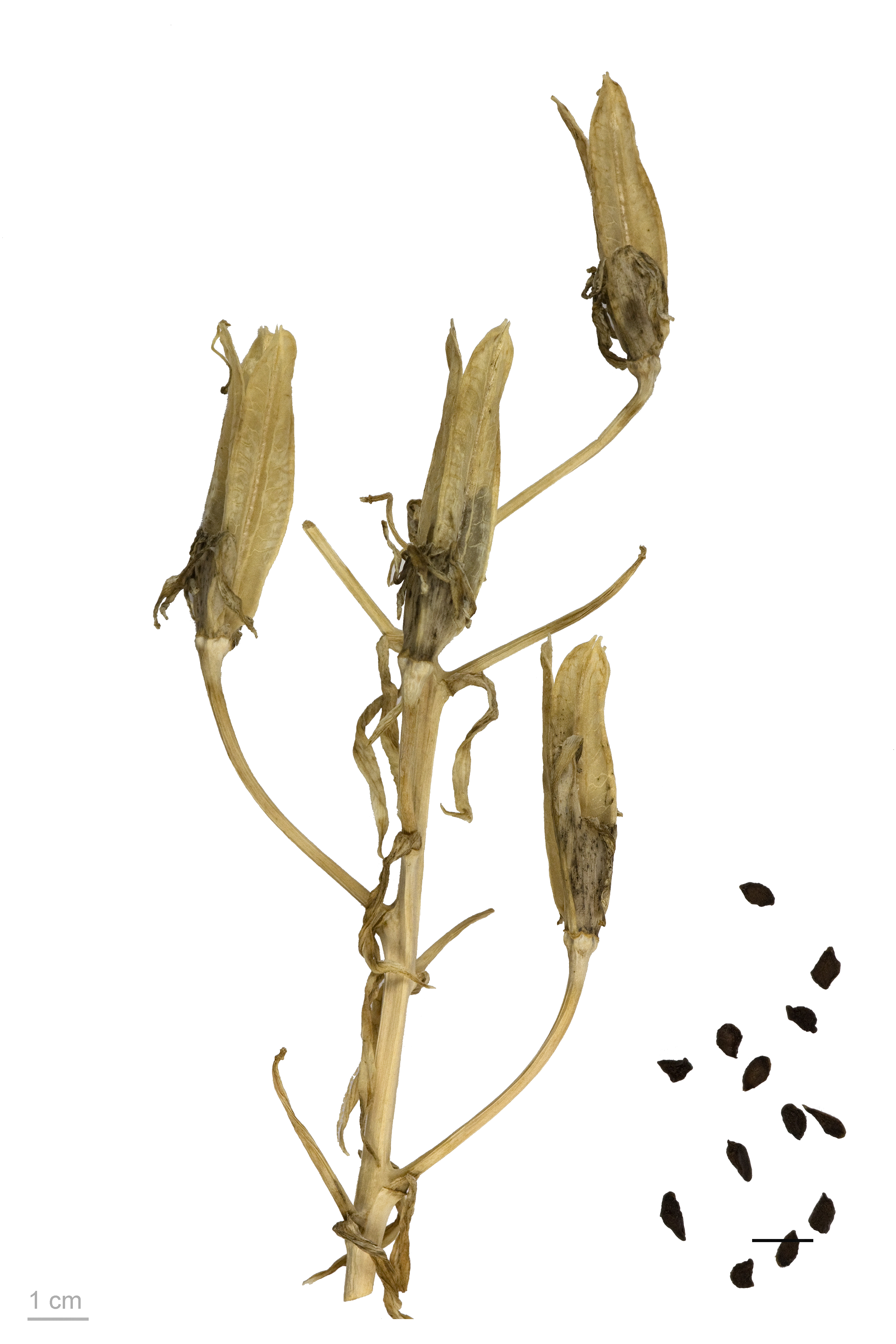
Ornithogalum candicans - MHNT

Ornithogalum candicans, known as the summer hyacinth, is a species of flowering plant in the family Asparagaceae, native to moist grassland in South Africa (Limpopo, Mpumalanga, Free State, Kwazulu/Natal, Eastern Cape). It is a bulbous perennial growing to 100–120 cm (39–47 in), with strap-shaped leaves and white snowdrop-like flowers in late summer. It is still widely referenced under its synonym Galtonia candicans. Originally it had been designated as Hyacinthus candicans, by Baker in 1870.

This plant has gained the Royal Horticultural Society's Award of Garden Merit.

== Cultivation ==
Hardiness: Z 7-10

== Bibliography ==
- Hughes, David (2014). "Galtonia candicans - Galtonia viridiflora". Gardenseeker.co.uk.
- Klopper, Ronell R (2005). "Galtonia candicans (Baker) Decne". PlantZAfrica.com. South African National Biodiversity Institute.
- Fine Gardening (2015). "Summer hyacinth: Galtonia candicans". Taunton’s Women’s Network.
- The Plant List (2013). "Ornithogalum candicans (Baker) J.C.Manning & Goldblatt".
