= Starflower =

Starflower or star flower may refer to:

== Plants ==
- Borage (Borago officinalis), an annual herb, and its product starflower oil
- Calytrix, a shrub of the myrtle family, native to Australia
- Erinus alpinus, an alpine plant
- Isotoma axillaris, a herbaceous perennial from Australia
- Grewia occidentalis (crossberry or lavender star flower)
- Ipheion, a genus of small bulbous perennials
- Orbea variegata, a succulent from South Africa
- Ornithogalum, a genus of perennial bulbous plants, including:
  - O. arabicum (star-of-Bethlehem)
  - O. dubium (sun star or orange star)
  - O. narbonense (pyramidal star-of-Bethlehem)
  - O. nutans (drooping star-of-Bethlehem)
  - O. pyrenaicum (Bath asparagus, Prussian asparagus, spiked star-of-Bethlehem)
  - O. umbellatum (common star-of-Bethlehem)
- Pentas, starcluster or starflower
- Trientalis/Lysimachia, shrubs of the primrose family including:
  - Trientalis borealis, northern starflower
  - Trientalis europaea, European starflower or Arctic starflower
  - Trientalis latifolia, Pacific starflower

== Other uses ==
- Starflower (album), 2017 Jennifer Paige album
- Starflower (My Little Pony), a pony character in the My Little Pony franchise
- Starflower, 2012 novel by Anne Elisabeth Stengl
