= Star of Bethlehem (disambiguation) =

The Star of Bethlehem is a Christian tradition regarding the birth of Jesus.

Star of Bethlehem may also refer to:

== Art ==
- Bethlehem Star, a metal star on the top of South Mountain above Bethlehem, Pennsylvania
- Star of Bethlehem (painting), a painting by Edward Burne-Jones

== Film and TV ==
- The Star of Bethlehem (1912 film), a 1912 silent film
- The Star of Bethlehem (2007 film), a 2007 film from filmmaker Frederick Larson about his use of astronomy software

== Music ==
- "Star of Bethlehem", a composition by John Williams from Home Alone and Home Alone 2: Lost in New York
- "Star of Bethlehem", an instrumental track on the 2007 Angels & Airwaves album I-Empire
- "Star of Bethlehem", a song from the 1977 Neil Young album American Stars 'n Bars

== Botany ==
- Angraecum sesquipedale, an orchid
- Calectasia cyanea, the "blue tinsel lily", of the family Dasypogonaceae
- Campanula isophylla, the Italian bellflower
- Gagea, a genus of Liliaceae and its species:
  - Gagea bohemica, the "early star of Bethlehem", of the family Liliaceae
  - Gagea lutea, the "yellow star of Bethlehem", of the family Liliaceae
- Hippobroma longiflora, the "star of Bethlehem", of the family Campanulaceae
- Ornithogalum, a genus of Hyacinthaceae, and to its species:
  - Ornithogalum arabicum, "Star-of-Bethlehem"
  - Ornithogalum narbonense, "Pyramidal star-of-Bethlehem"
  - Ornithogalum nutans, "Drooping star-of-Bethlehem"
  - Ornithogalum pyrenaicum, "Spiked star-of-Bethlehem"
  - Ornithogalum umbellatum, "Common star-of-Bethlehem"
