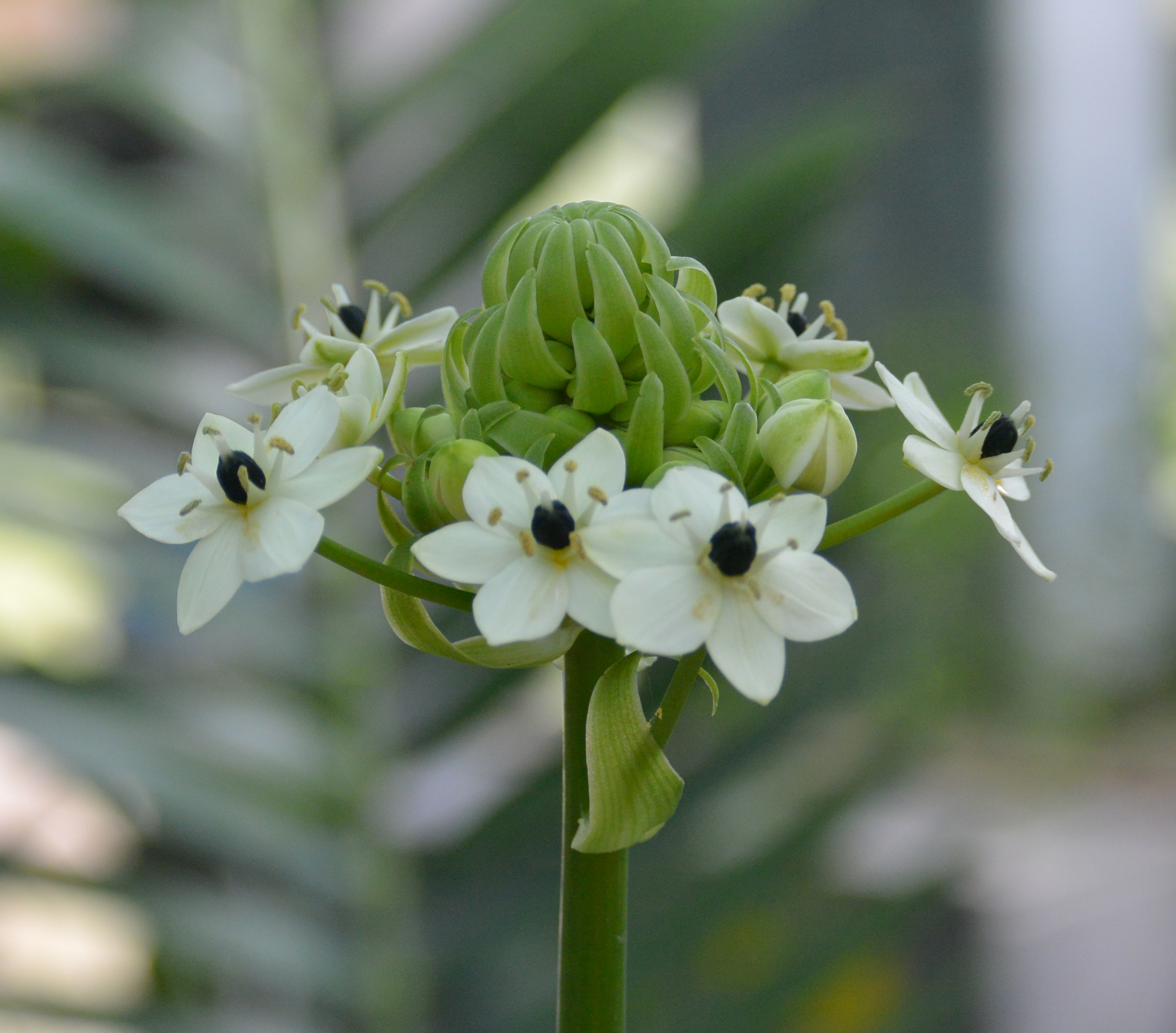

Scientific classification
- Kingdom: Plantae
- Clade: Tracheophytes
- Clade: Angiosperms
- Clade: Monocots
- Order: Asparagales
- Family: Asparagaceae
- Subfamily: Scilloideae
- Tribe: Ornithogaleae
- Genus: Ornithogalum
- Species: O. saundersiae

Binomial name
- Ornithogalum saundersiae Baker

Synonyms
- Galtonia saundersiae (Baker) Mart.-Azorín, M.B.Crespo & Juan; Ornithogalum excelsum Diels ex Engl.

= Ornithogalum saundersiae =

Species of flowering plant

Ornithogalum saundersiae, or giant chincherinchee, is a species of Ornithogalum (star of Bethlehem) in the subfamily Scilloideae of family Asparagaceae.

== Description ==
Ornithogalum saundersiae is a perennial, herbaceous bulbous plant. It reaches 30 to 100 cm. in height. The leaves measure 60 x 5 cm. and are less than half as long as the flower stem. The upper leaf surface is a shiny dark green. The inflorescence consists of numerous flowers and is conical. The flower stems are long. The tepals are white, 10 to 15 millimeters long. The ovary is a very dark green. The plant flowers from June to August.

== Distribution and habitat ==
Ornithogalum saundersiae is found in South Africa in the Eastern Transvaal, Natal, and Eswatini. It grows best on rocky glades.

== Uses ==
Sold as bulbs for ornamental garden flowers and as cut flowers.

== Bibliography ==
- Eckehardt J. Jäger, Friedrich Ebel, Peter Hanelt, Gerd K. Müller (eds.): Rothmaler Exkursionsflora von Deutschland. Band 5: Krautige Zier- und Nutzpflanzen. Spektrum Akademischer Verlag, Berlin Heidelberg 2008, ISBN 978-3-8274-0918-8.
- Gard. Chron. ser. 3, 16:452. 1894
- "Ornithogalum saundersiae". Germplasm Resources Information Network. Agricultural Research Service, United States Department of Agriculture.
- Global plants
