= Clout's Wood =

Protected area in Wiltshire, England

Coordinates: 51.51516°N 1.80396°W

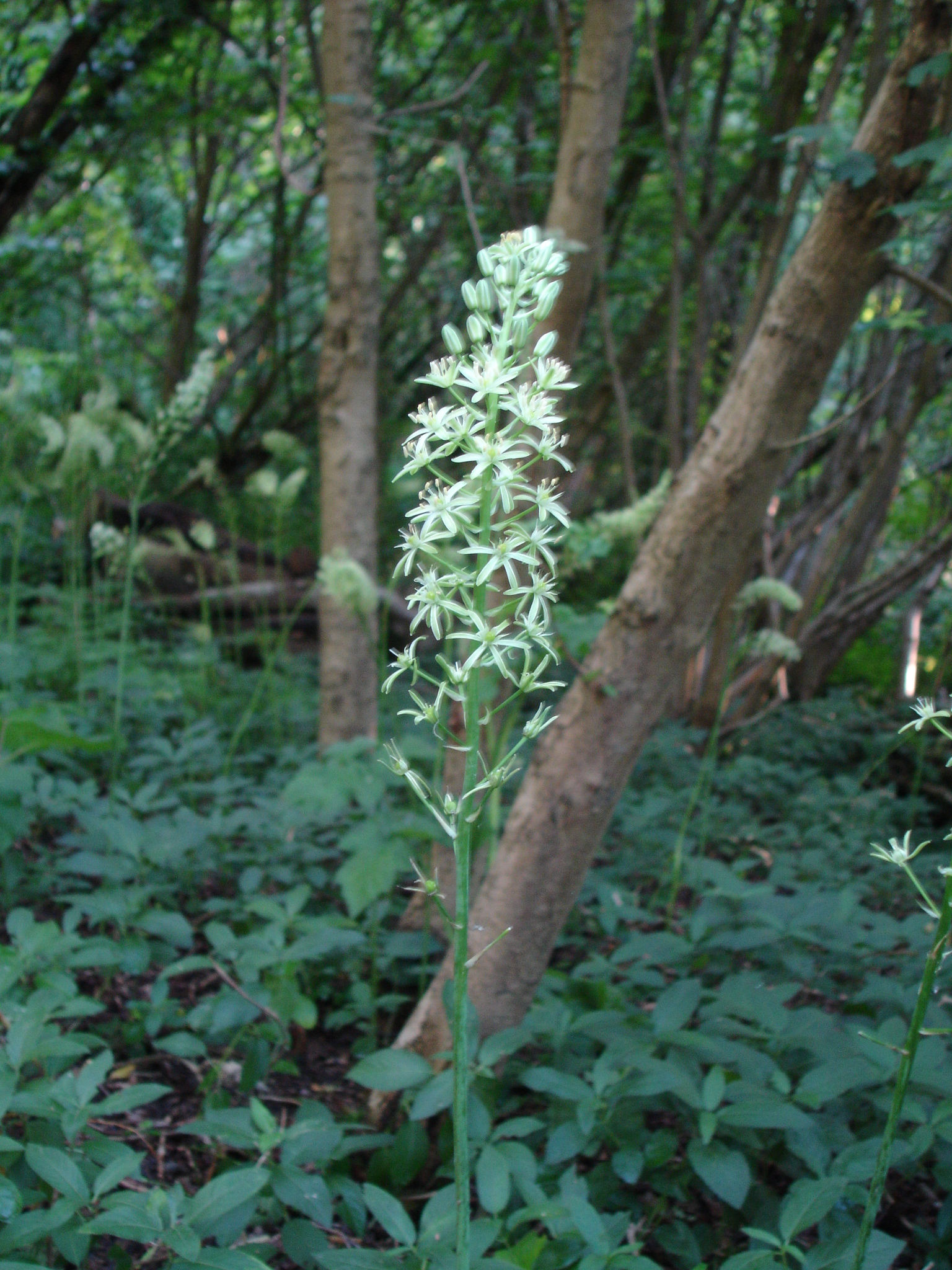
Flowering Bath asparagus in Clout's Wood, Wroughton

Clout's Wood (grid reference SU137796) is an 11.78 hectare biological Site of Special Scientific Interest in Wiltshire, notified in 1951.

The site is managed as a nature reserve by Wiltshire Wildlife Trust.

== Sources ==
- Natural England citation sheet for the site (accessed 23 March 2022)
