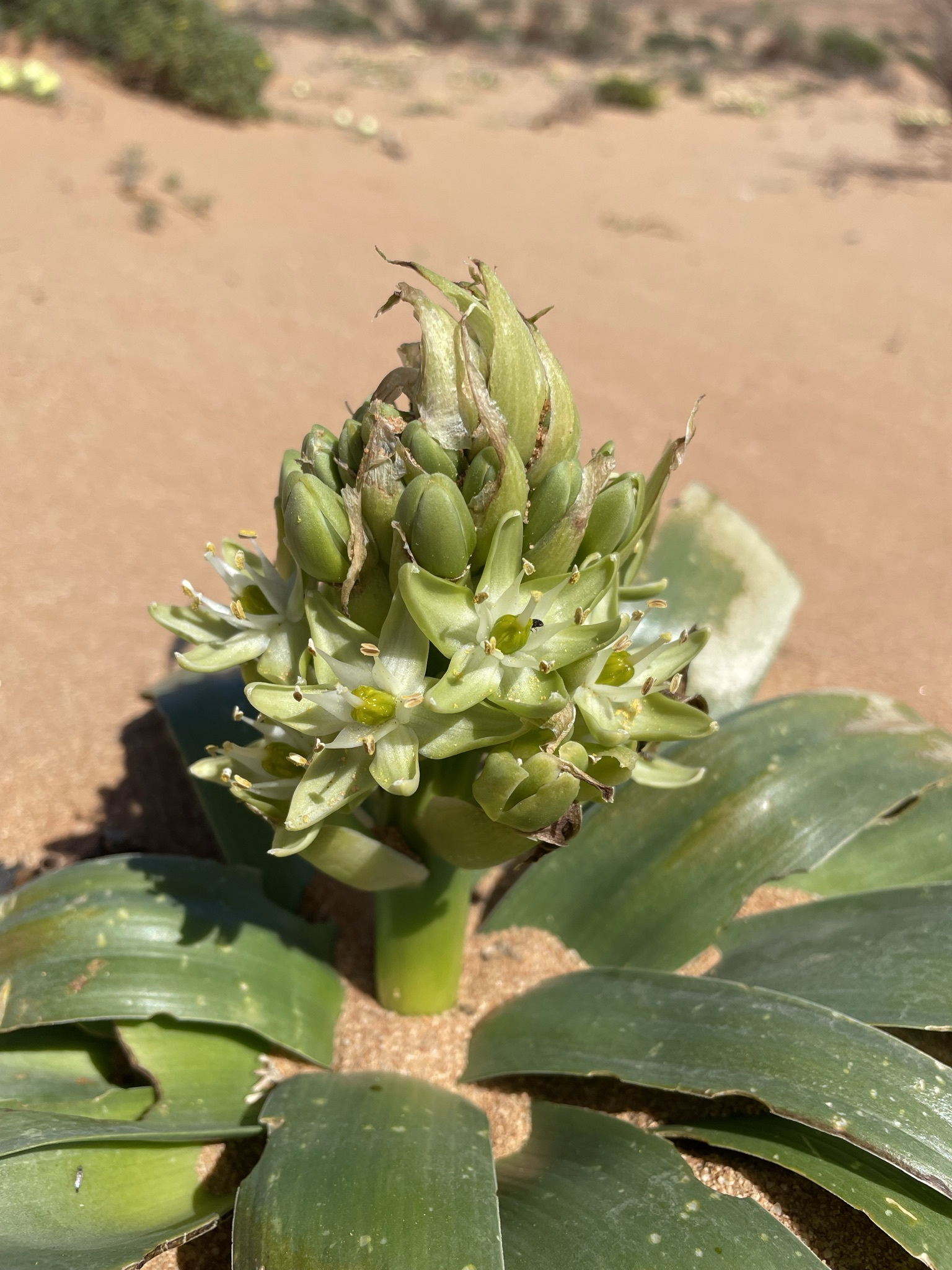

Conservation status
- Least Concern (SANBI Red List)

Scientific classification
- Kingdom: Plantae
- Clade: Tracheophytes
- Clade: Angiosperms
- Clade: Monocots
- Order: Asparagales
- Family: Asparagaceae
- Subfamily: Scilloideae
- Tribe: Ornithogaleae
- Genus: Ornithogalum
- Species: O. xanthochlorum

Binomial name
- Ornithogalum xanthochlorum Baker

Synonyms
- Ethesia xanthochlora (Baker) Mart.-Azorín, M.B.Crespo & Juan

= Ornithogalum xanthochlorum =

Species of plant endemic to the Cape Provinces

Ornithogalum xanthochlorum is a species of flowering plant in the genus Ornithogalum. It is endemic to the Cape Provinces of South Africa. It also known as the Namaqua chink or slangkop (Afrikaans for snake head).

== Distribution ==
Ornithogalum xanthochlorum is found in the Northern Cape and the Western Cape.

== Conservation status ==
Ornithogalum xanthochlorum is classified as Least Concern.

== Gallery ==
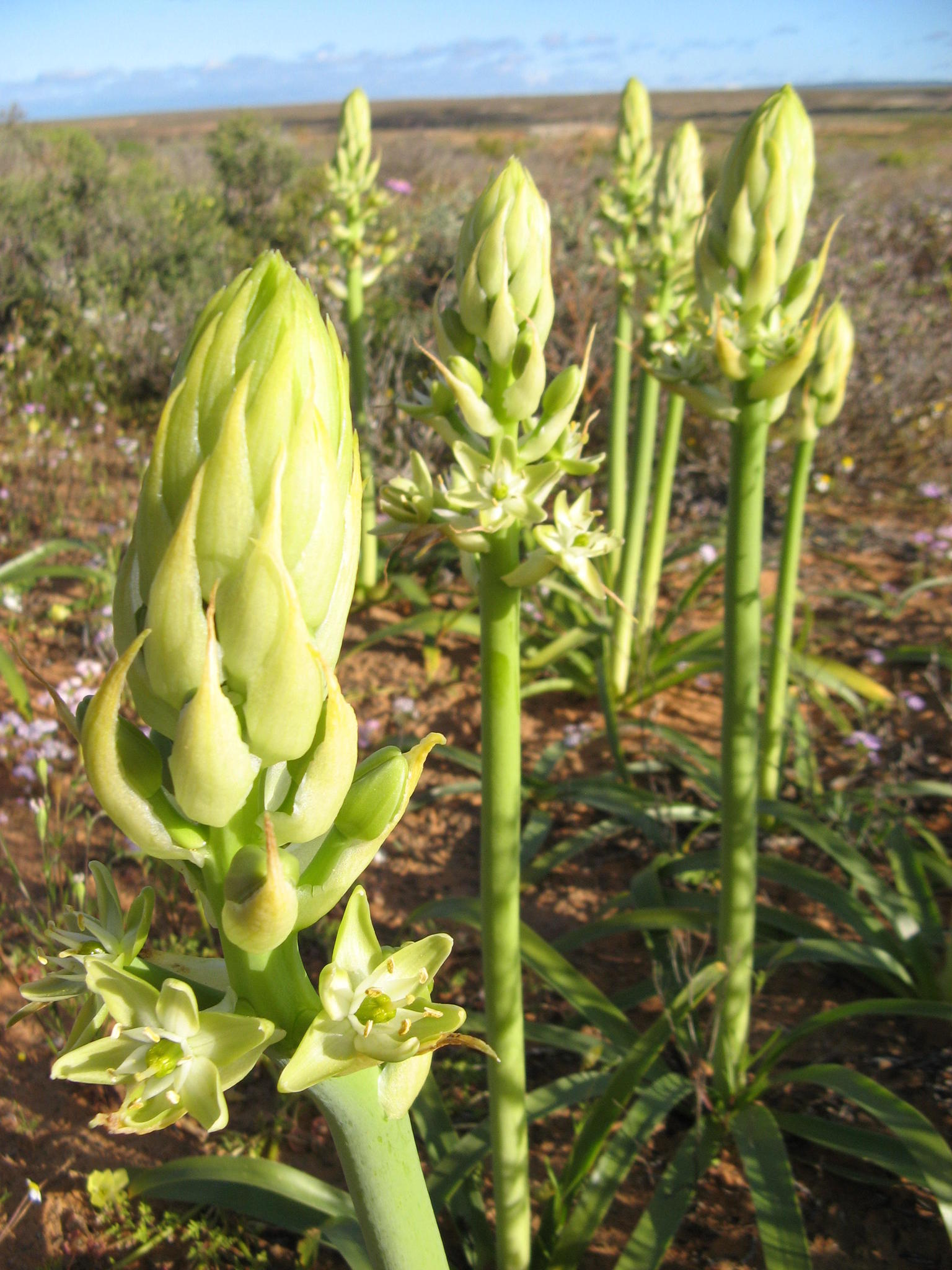

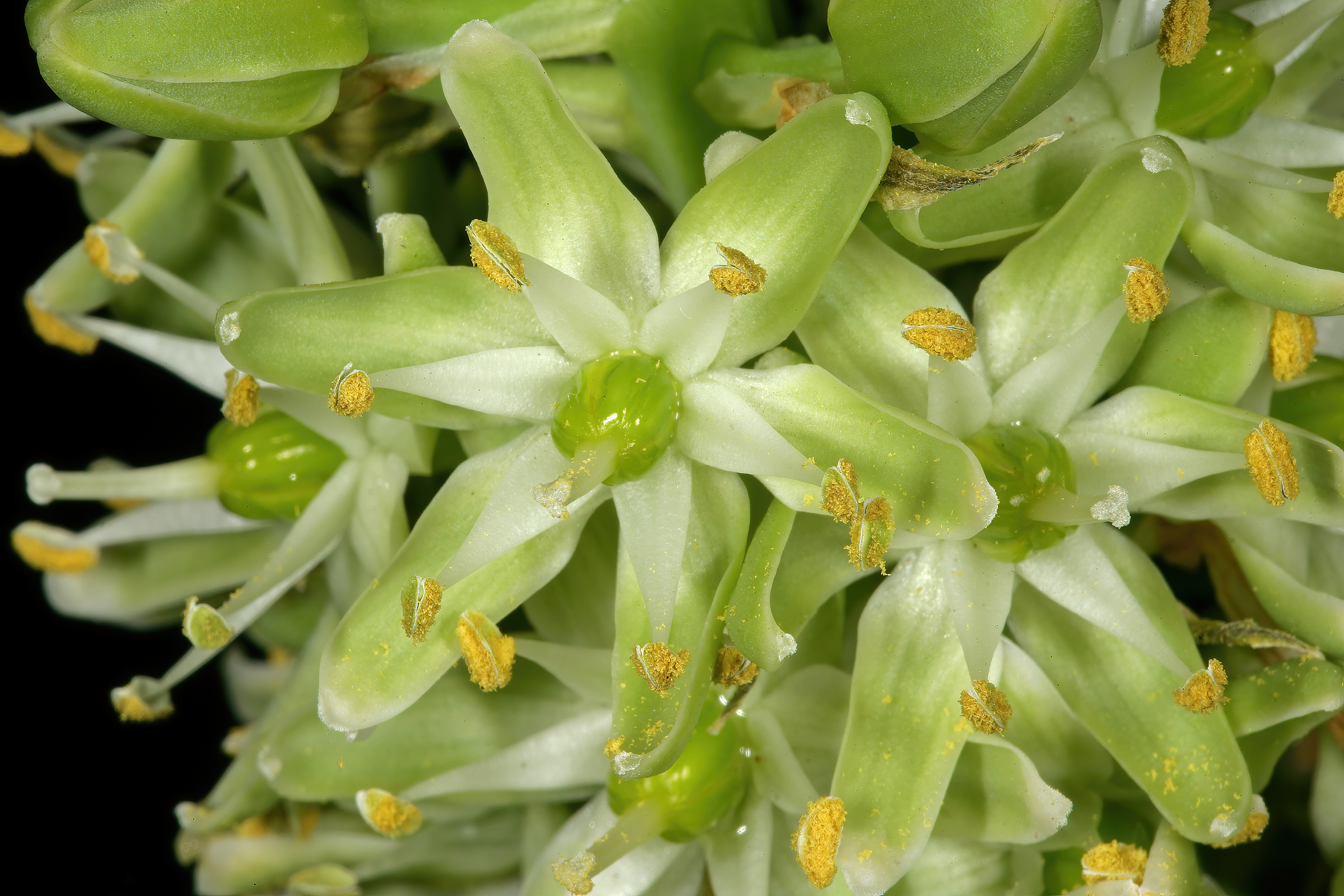

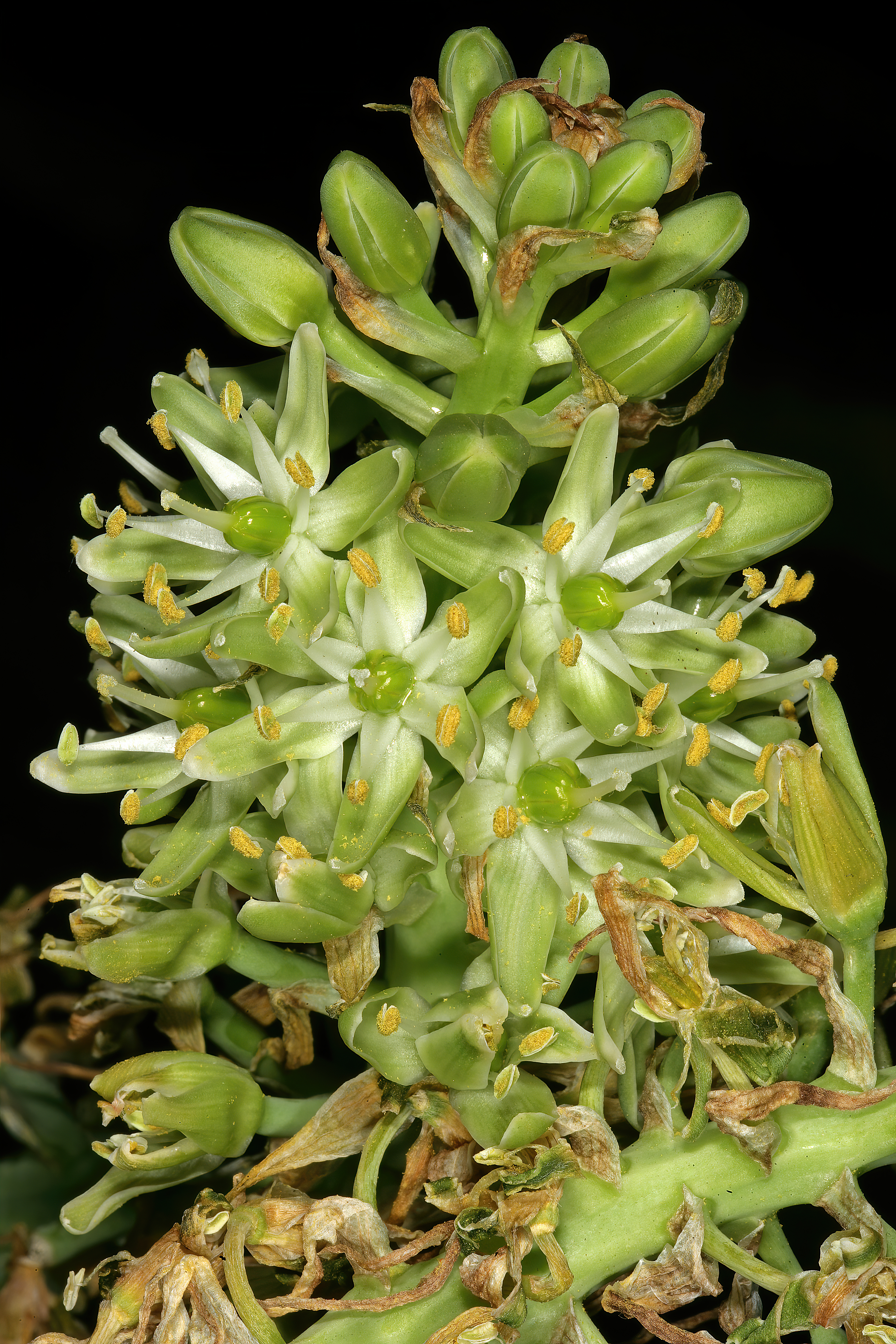
