= Anne Elisabeth Stengl =

American novelist (born 1986)

- Born: April 11, 1986 (age 40); McChord AFB, Washington, U.S.
- Occupation: Writer
- Spouse: Rohan de Silva
- Children: 4
- Writing career
- Period: 2010-present
- Genres: Children's literature, Fantasy, Fairy tale, Allegory
- Notable works: Heartless; Veiled Rose; Starflower
- Notable awards: Christy Award 2010 and 2011
- Website: www.anneelisabethstengl.blogspot.com

Anne Elisabeth Stengl (born April 11, 1986) is the Christy Award-winning author of the fantasy series Tales of Goldstone Wood, published by Bethany House Publishers. USA Today called the series "epically driven high fantasy". Her books Heartless and Veiled Rose both won Christy Awards, and Starflower was nominated in 2013. Stengl is known for her use of third-person omniscient narrative and non-chronological series progression. She studied illustration at Grace College and English literature at Campbell University.

== Bibliography ==
=== Tales of Goldstone Wood ===
- 2010 Heartless Her most widely held book, according to WorldCat; it is held in 605 libraries
- 2011 Veiled Rose
- 2012 Moonblood
- 2012 Starflower
- 2013 Dragonwitch
- 2013 Goddess Tithe (Novella).
- 2014 Shadow Hand
- 2014 Golden Daughter
- 2015 Draven's Light

=== Other works ===
- 2016 A Branch of Silver, a Branch of Gold
