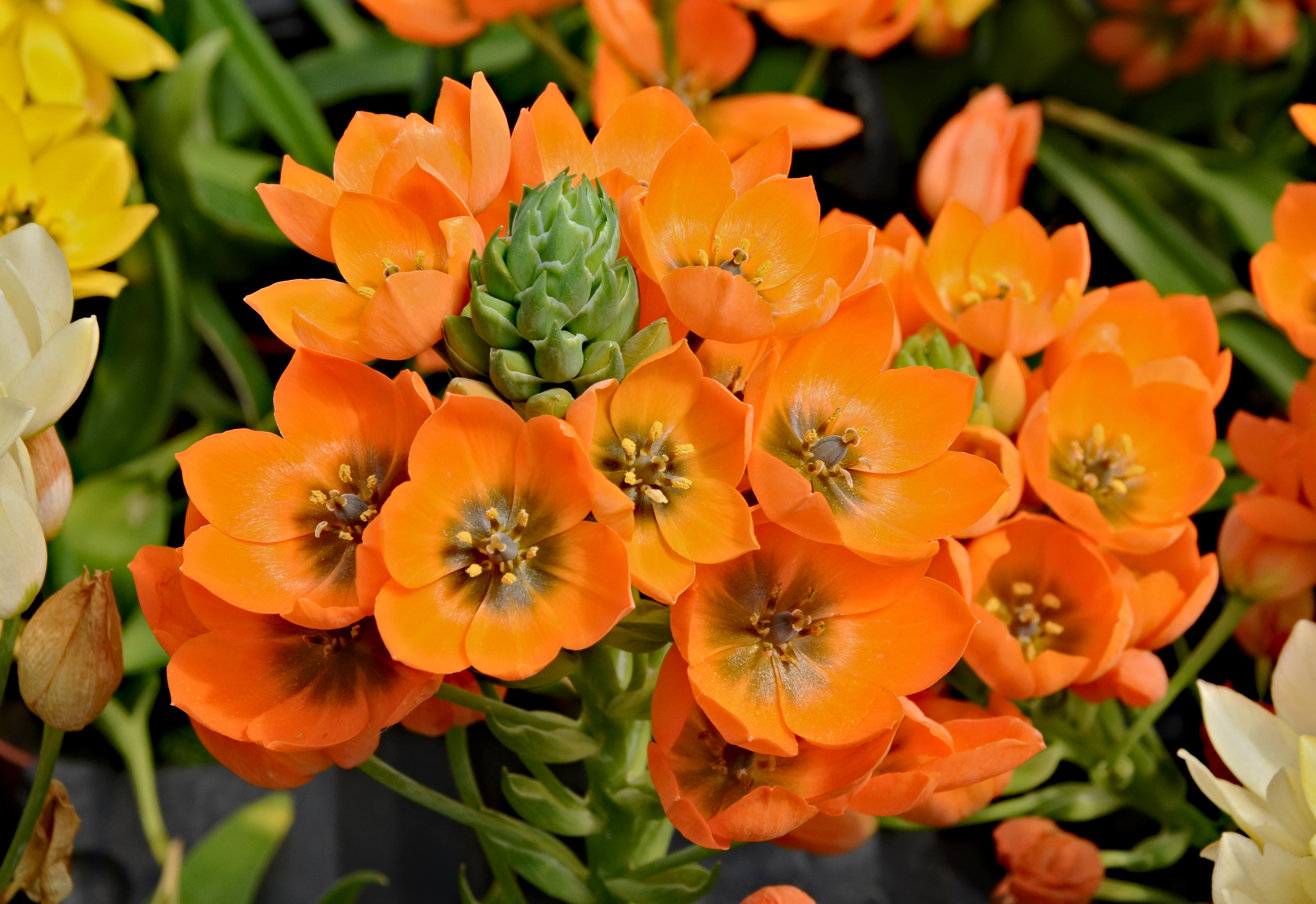

Scientific classification
- Kingdom: Plantae
- Clade: Tracheophytes
- Clade: Angiosperms
- Clade: Monocots
- Order: Asparagales
- Family: Asparagaceae
- Subfamily: Scilloideae
- Genus: Ornithogalum
- Species: O. dubium

Binomial name
- Ornithogalum dubium Houtt.

Synonyms
- Synonyms list: Eliokarmos dubius (Houtt.) Mart.-Azorín, M.B.Crespo & Juan; Myogalum flavescens Endl.; Ornithogalum alticola F.M.Leight.; Ornithogalum aureum Curtis; Ornithogalum brownleei F.M.Leight.; Ornithogalum citrinum Schltr. ex Poelln.; Ornithogalum fergusoniae L.Bolus; Ornithogalum flavescens Jacq. nom. illeg.; Ornithogalum flavissimum Jacq.; Ornithogalum leipoldtii L.Bolus; Ornithogalum miniatum Jacq.; Ornithogalum pillansii F.M.Leight.; Ornithogalum vandermerwei E.Barnes

= Ornithogalum dubium =

Species of flowering plant

Ornithogalum dubium, common names sun star, star of Bethlehem orange star, or yellow chincherinchee, is a species of flowering plant in the family Asparagaceae, subfamily Scilloideae. It is a South African (Cape Province) endemic.

The Latin specific epithet dubium means "dubious" or "unlike others of the genus".

== Description ==
Growing to 50 cm (20 in) tall, O. dubium is a bulbous perennial with 3-8 yellowish green leaves. The leaf margins are ciliate with scapes 10–25 cm (4–10 in) long. The flowers are borne in winter or spring, in cylindrical to almost spherical racemes consisting of 5-25 flowers. The tepals may be orange, red, yellow or rarely white, often with a green or brown center. The common name of the genus Ornithogalum, Star-of-Bethlehem, is based on its star-shaped flowers, after the Star of Bethlehem that appeared in the biblical account of the birth of Jesus. The genus Ornithogalum contains about 180 species.

== Cultivation ==
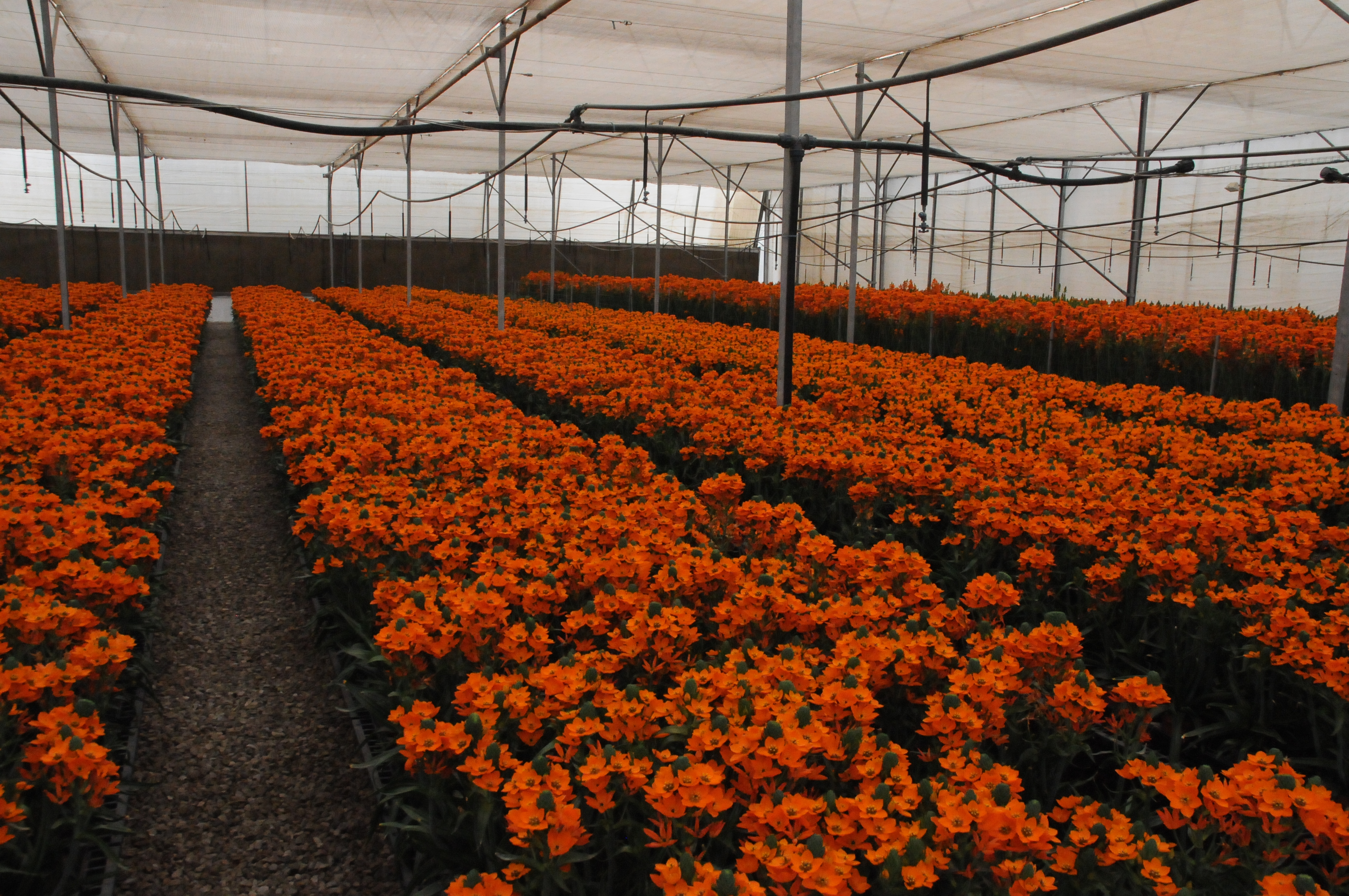
Ornithogalum dubium commercially grown in Israel

O. dubium is frost-tender and is best overwintered in a dry, frost-free place, then re-potted in spring. The main soil requirement is excellent drainage, with ample water early in the growth cycle, but dry during the dormant season. The plant should be grown in a sheltered spot in full sun. It is reported to be toxic by ingestion, and the leaves cause irritation.

This plant has gained the Royal Horticultural Society's Award of Garden Merit.
