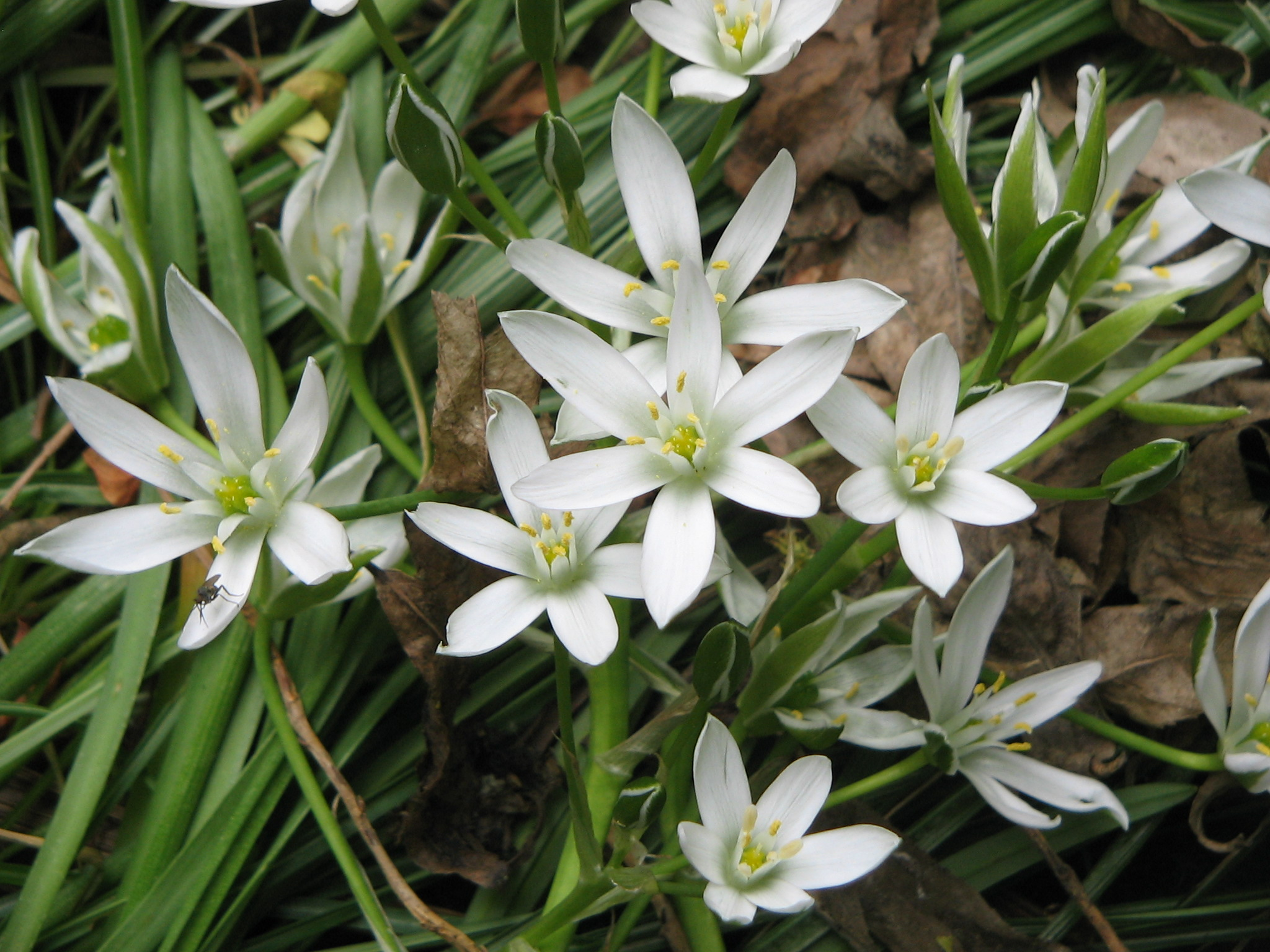
- Ornithogalum umbellatum

Scientific classification
- Kingdom: Plantae
- Clade: Tracheophytes
- Clade: Angiosperms
- Clade: Monocots
- Order: Asparagales
- Family: Asparagaceae
- Subfamily: Scilloideae
- Tribe: Ornithogaleae
- Genus: Ornithogalum; L.

Type species
- Ornithogalum umbellatum

Species
- See text

Synonyms
- List: Albucea Rchb.; Aspasia Salisb.; Avonsera Speta; Beryllis Salisb.; Brizophile Salisb. nom. superfl.; Caruelia Parl.; Cathissa Salisb.; Celsia Heist. ex Fabr. nom. illeg.; Eliokarmos Raf.; Elsiea F.M.Leight.; Eustachys Salisb. nom. illeg.; Fenelonia Raf.; Galtonia Decne.; ×Honogalum Holub; Honorius Gray; Ifuon Raf.; Lomaresis Raf.; Loncomelos Raf.; Loncoxis Raf.; Melomphis Raf.; Myanthe Salisb.; Myogalum Link; Neopatersonia Schönland; Nicipe Raf.; Parthenostachys Fourr.; Phaeocles Salisb.; Raphelingia Dumort.; Raxamaris Raf.; Tomoxis Raf.; Tritriela Raf.; Virdika Adans.

= Ornithogalum =

Genus of plants in the asparagus family

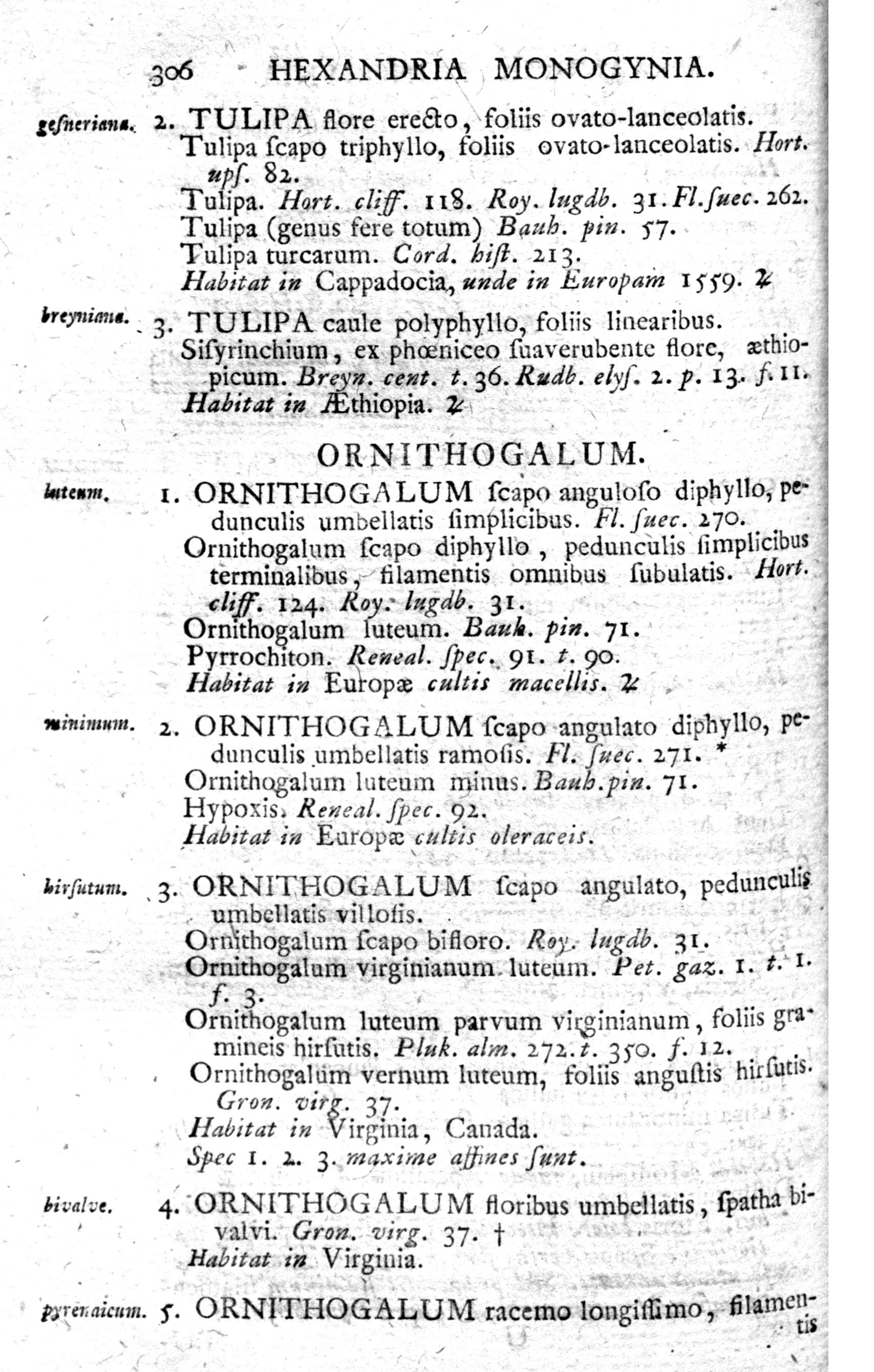
Linnaeus' description of Ornithogalum 1753

Ornithogalum is a genus of perennial plants mostly native to southern Europe and southern Africa belonging to the family Asparagaceae. Some species are native to other areas such as the Caucasus. Some species are classified as noxious invasive weeds in some portions of North America. Growing from a bulb, species have linear basal leaves and a slender stalk, up to 30 cm (12 in) tall, bearing clusters of typically white star-shaped flowers, often striped with green. The common name of the genus, star-of-Bethlehem, is based on its star-shaped flowers, after the Star of Bethlehem that appears in the biblical account of the birth of Jesus. The number of species has varied considerably, depending on authority, from 50 to 300.

== Description ==
Ornithogalum species are perennial bulbous geophytes with basal leaves. Sensu lato, the genus has the characteristics of the tribe Ornithogaleae as a whole, since the tribe is monotypic in that sense. Sensu stricto, the genus is characterised by long linear to oblong-lanceolate (lance-shaped) leaves, sometimes with a white longitudinal band on the adaxial (upper) side, an inflorescence that is corymbose or pseudocorymbose, tepals that are white with a longitudinal green band only visible on the abaxial (lower) side, a capsule that is obovate or oblong, and truncate with six noticeable ribs in section and seeds that are globose with a prominently reticulate (net-like pattern) testa. The bulbs are ovoid with free or concrescent scales.

The longitudinal band on the leaves is thought to be caused by an interruption of palisade tissue in the central portion of the leaf. This is an apomorphy that was not present in the early lineage of this clade, but is also seen in some Albuca species.

== Taxonomy ==
Ornithogalum was originally described by Linnaeus in 1753, with 12 species, which he placed in the Hexandria Monogynia (six stamens, one carpel). When Michel Adanson formed the family Liliaceae in 1763, he placed Ornithogalum there, where it largely remained till this very large family was dismembered towards the end of the 20th century. Specifically, he included the genus with the onions (now Allioideae).

By the 1870s, as Baker describes in his revision of the family, the taxonomy of Liliaceae had become vast and complicated. Baker placed Ornithogalum in the tribe Scilleae, one of eight tribes into which he divided the Liliaceae. He then further subdivided the genus into seven subgenera. Of those, the first, Heliocharmos, corresponds to the modern Ornithogalum sensu stricto, with 23 species.

Later, in the United Kingdom, Bentham and Hooker published their volume on the Liliaceae in Latin in 1883. They divided the family into 20 tribes and placed Ornithogalum in the tribe Scilleae with 19 other genera, and indicated 70 species existed. In the German literature the taxonomic system of Engler completed its classification of the Liliaceae in 1888. He divided the family into 12 subfamilies and subordinate tribes. Ornithogalum was then placed in the subfamily Lilioideae and tribe Scilleae together with 21 other genera. The 70 species of Ornithogalum were then further divided into six sections, with section Heliocharmos corresponding to Baker's subgenus.

Ornithogalum is one of four genera in the tribe Ornithogaleae, the largest tribe within the subfamily Scilloideae of the Asparagaceae. Historically, it was treated as part of the subfamily Ornithogaloideae of Hyacinthaceae, now obsolete terms. The preferred treatment is to consider the Hyacinthaceae as subfamily Scilloideae of the Asparagaceae. The original subfamilies within Hyacinthaceae became tribes of subfamily Scilloideae. Thus subfamily Ornithogaloideae became tribe Ornithogaleae.

The precise taxonomy of the Ornithogaloideae/Ornithogaleae has been problematic since at least the time of Linnaeus. The Ornithogaloideae were one of four major clades within the Hyacinthaceae. Phylogenetic analysis subsumed all of that subfamily into the genus Ornithogalum with about 300 species. This sensu lato reduction of Speta's 14 genera into one was not widely accepted, though they were polyphyletic, and had a number of problems. (This also had the effect of eliminating Galtonia as a genus, under which a number of Ornithogalum species are still sold.)

Further analysis with wider sampling (70 compared to 40 taxa) and a third plastid region (matK) revealed the presence of three clades (A, B and C) within Ornithogaleae/Ornithogalum. Consequently, a new classification was proposed with three tribes and four genera, Ornithogalum corresponding to clade C, placed in tribe Ornithogaleae, but further subdivided into subgenera and sections, with 160 species. Galtonia was retained as a taxon, but at the subgenus level. An alternative approach was suggested by combining plastid gene sequences with nuclear DNA sequences, morphology, and biogeography. This supported Manning's clade C within which Ornithogalum was contained, but the very large subgenus Ornithogalum was noted to still be heterogeneous, which they had managed by treating it as seven sections. This study suggested reversing the sensu lato (lumping) approach of Manning et al., reverting to separate genera (splitting), thus resurrecting Galtonia.

The sensu stricto classification of Martinez-Azorin et al. (2011) reduces the number of species to 50 as originally proposed by Speta. Thus, any consideration of the genus needs to be examined as to whether it refers to sensu stricto, the 50 species considered by Speta (1998) and Martinez-Azorin et al. (2011), or sensu lato, the much larger genus envisaged by Manning et al. (2009).

=== Subdivision ===
This very large genus has long been divided into many subgenera. The Flora Europaea (1980) lists 15 subgenera, many of which had at various times been separate distinct genera. Having originally subsumed all of the Ornithogaleae genera into the single genus Ornithogalum, Manning et al. (2009) later subdivided this now very large genus into four subgenera after resurrecting three of the original subsumed genera (Albuca, Pseudogaltonia, Dipcadi). As proposed by them the genus has the following structure:

- subgenus Avonsera (Speta) J.C.Manning & Goldblatt (monotypic: Ornithogalum convallarioides)
- subgenus Galtonia (Decne.) J.C.Manning & Goldblatt (7 species)
- subgenus Aspasia (Salisb.) Oberm. (30 species)
- subgenus Ornithogalum (7 sections, 120 species)

=== Species ===
Of the roughly 180 species, the best known are O. umbellatum, O. saundersiae, O. arabicum, and O. thyrsoides.

- Ornithogalum arabicum (Star-of-Bethlehem)
- Ornithogalum dubium (Sun star, yellow chincherinchee)
- Ornithogalum maculatum (Snake flower)
- Ornithogalum narbonense (Pyramidal star-of-Bethlehem)
- Ornithogalum nutans (Drooping star-of-Bethlehem)
- Ornithogalum pyrenaicum (Bath asparagus/Prussian asparagus/spiked star-of-Bethlehem)
- Ornithogalum saundersiae (Giant chincherinchee)
- Ornithogalum thyrsoides (Chincherinchee)
- Ornithogalum umbellatum (Garden star-of-Bethlehem) Type species
- Ornithogalum xanthochlorum (Namaqua chink/slangkop)

Species formerly placed in Galtonia include:

- Ornithogalum candicans (Baker) J.C.Manning & Goldblatt (Summer hyacinth, Cape hyacinth)
- Ornithogalum princeps (Baker) J.C.Manning & Goldblatt
- Ornithogalum regalis (Hilliard & B.L.Burtt) J.C.Manning & Goldblatt
- Ornithogalum saundersiae Baker
- Ornithogalum viridiflorum (I.Verd.) J.C.Manning & Goldblatt

=== Etymology ===
The Latin genus name ornithogalum derives from Greek ὀρνιθόγαλον ornithogalon referring to ornithogalum umbellatum, itself deriving from ὄρνις ornis "bird" (GEN ὄρνιθος ornithos) and γάλα gala "milk". The name is thought to be related to the white colour of the flowers; in some species, they resemble bird droppings. The possible (non-attested) alternative form in ancient Greek ὀρνιθογάλη ornithogalē seems to be the source of classical Latin ornithogale as used by Pliny the Elder.

== Distribution and habitat ==
When the genus is broadly circumscribed, as for example by Plants of the World Online, species are widely distributed over several continents including Africa (other than the tropics), Madagascar, Europe, and temperate Asia (as far as Afghanistan).

== Uses ==
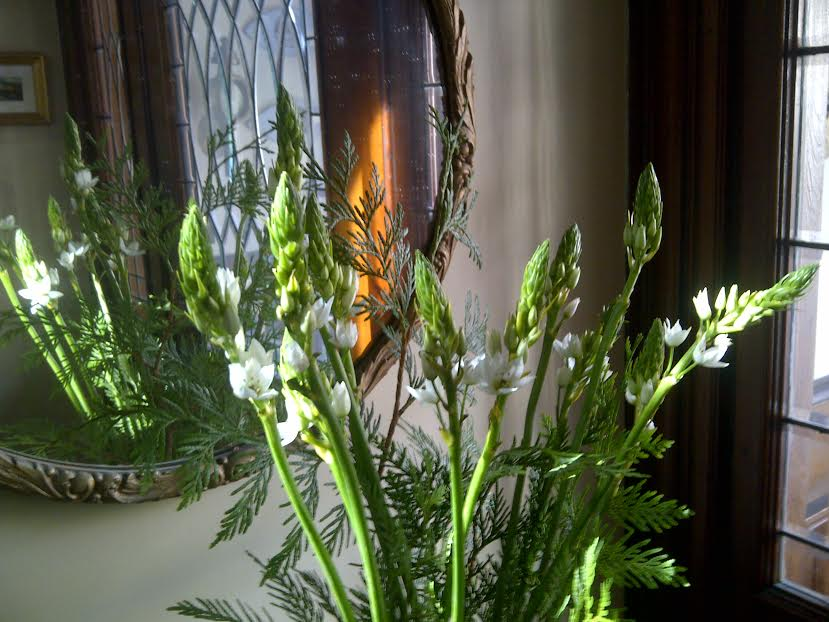
Vase of cut Ornithogalum thyrsoides flower stems

Ornithogalum species may be sold as cut flowers, particularly O. arabicum, O. dubium, O. saundersiae, and O.thyrsoides. They are also sold as ornamental garden flowers.

== Toxicity and use in alternative medicine ==
Some of the plants in the genus are poisonous, and have been known to kill grazing animals. Others are edible and used as vegetables. The bulbs contain various toxic alkaloids and steroids.

Ornithogalum has been listed as one of the 38 plants used to prepare Bach flower remedies, a kind of alternative medicine promoted for its effect on health. However, according to Cancer Research UK, "there is no scientific evidence to prove that flower remedies can control, cure or prevent any type of disease, including cancer".

== Gallery ==
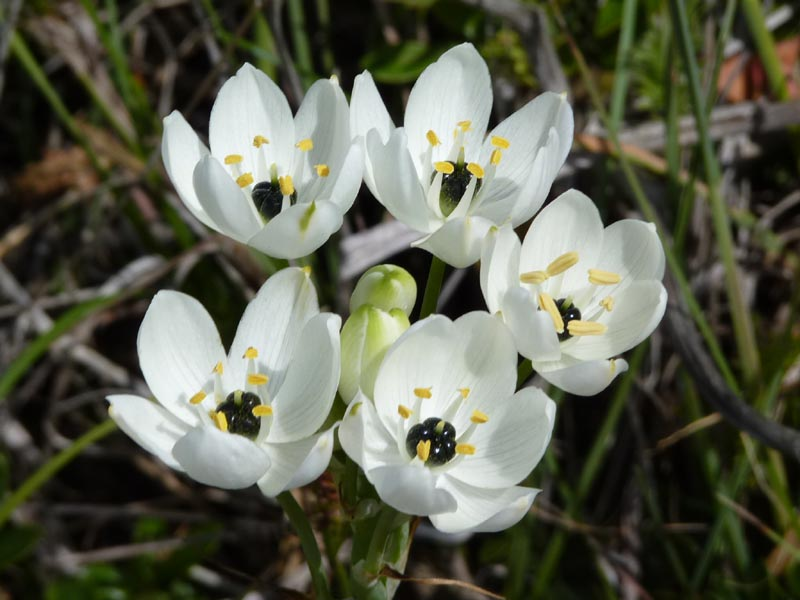
O. arabicum

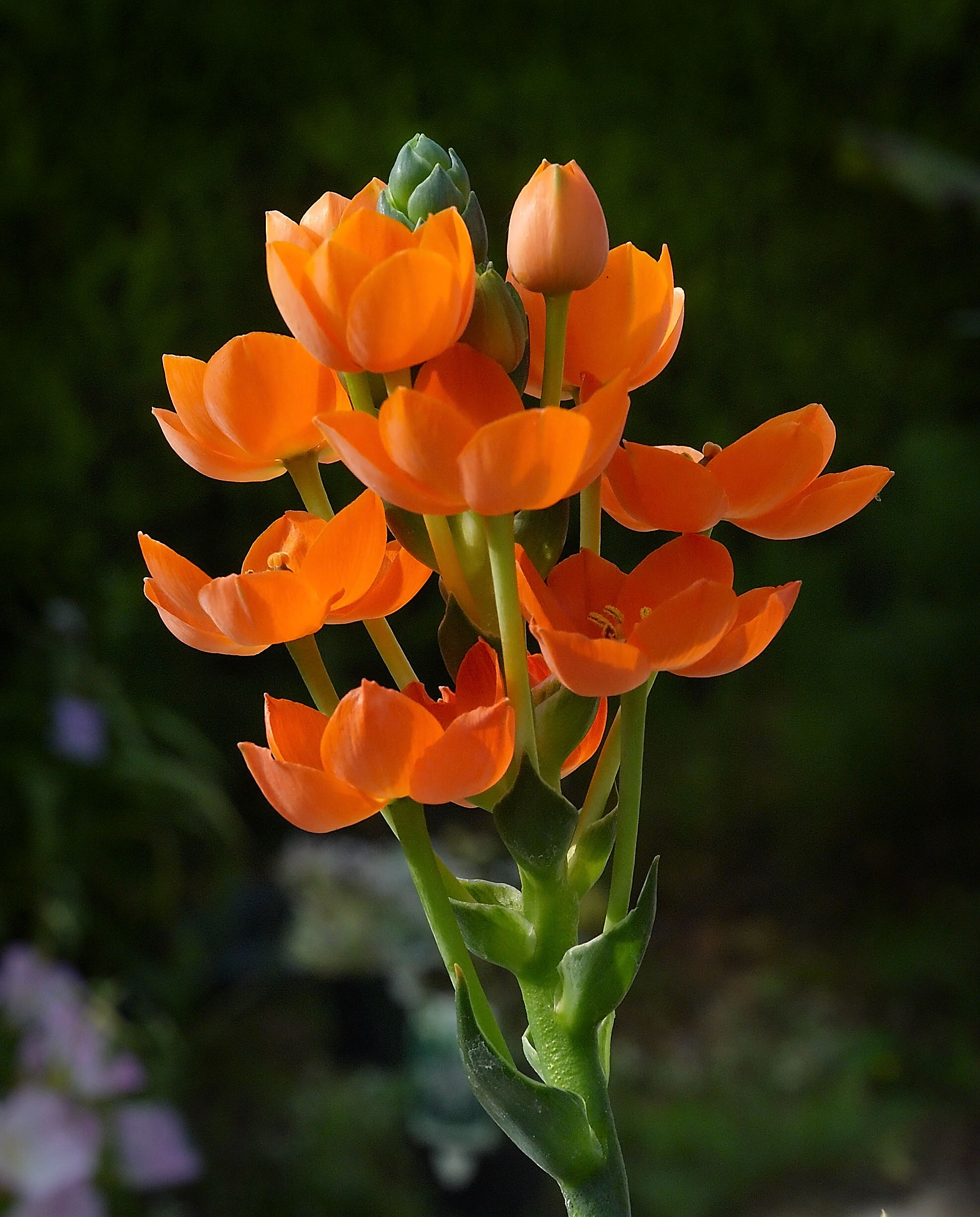
O. dubium

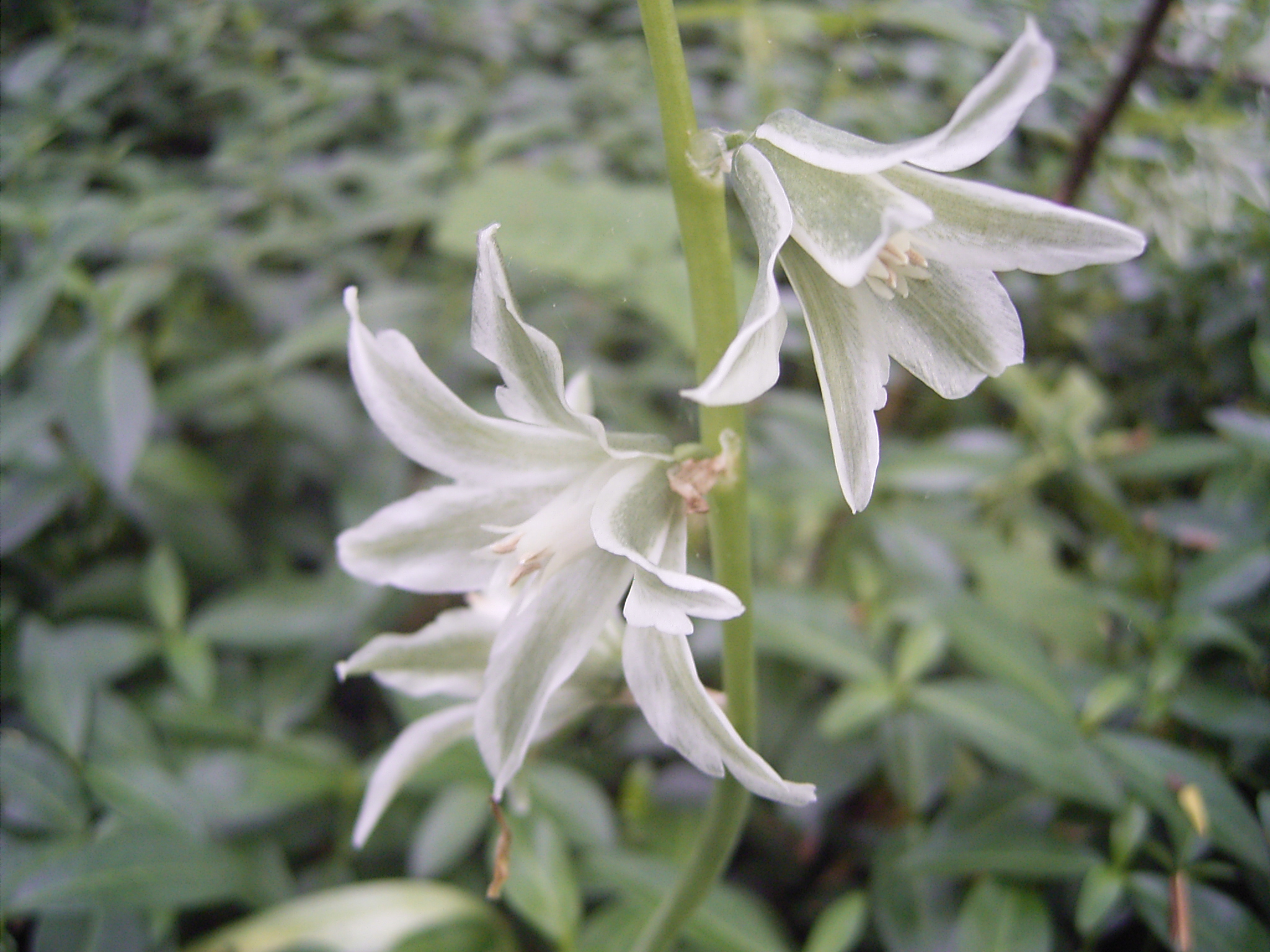
O. nutans

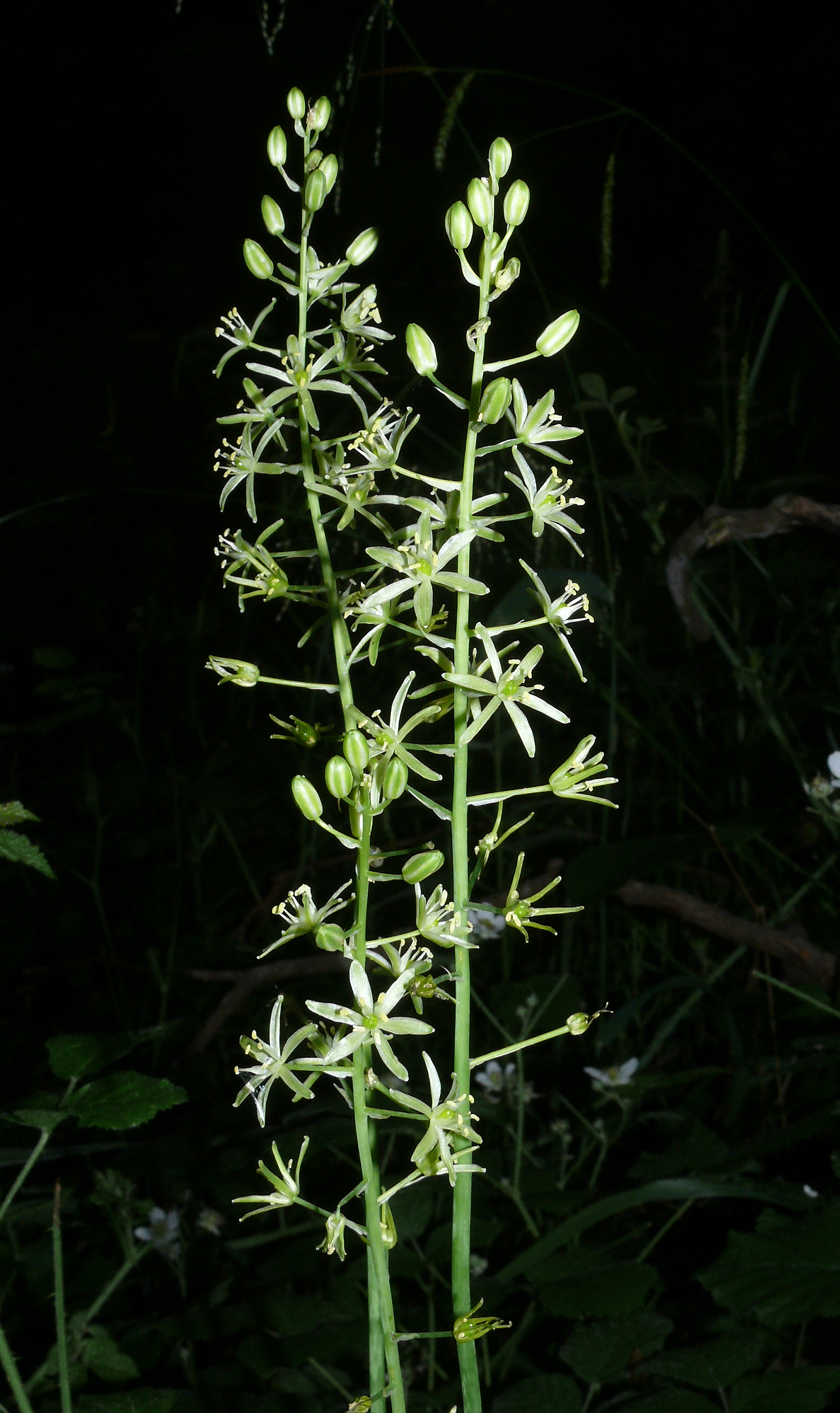
O. pyrenaicum

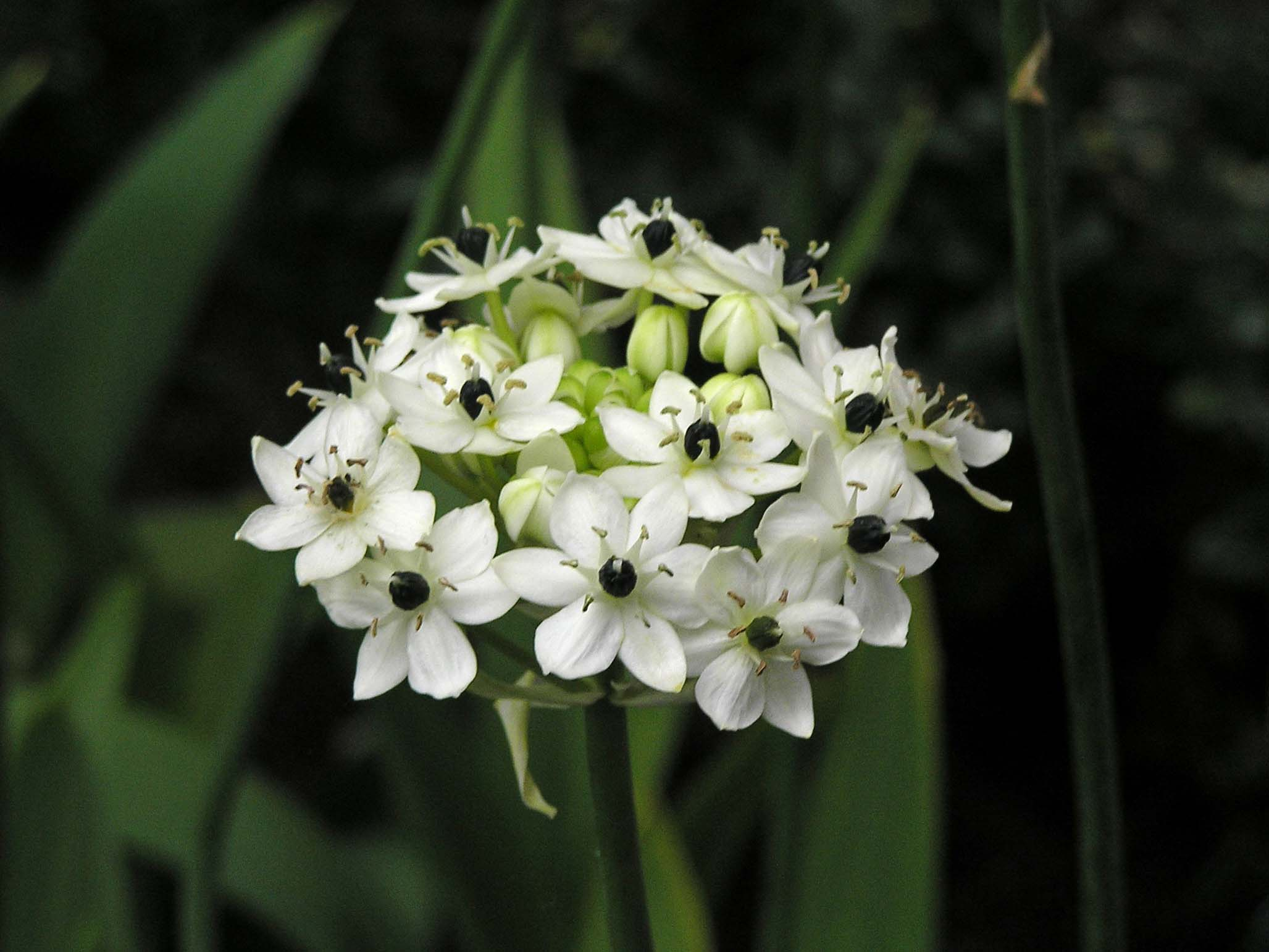
O. saundersiae

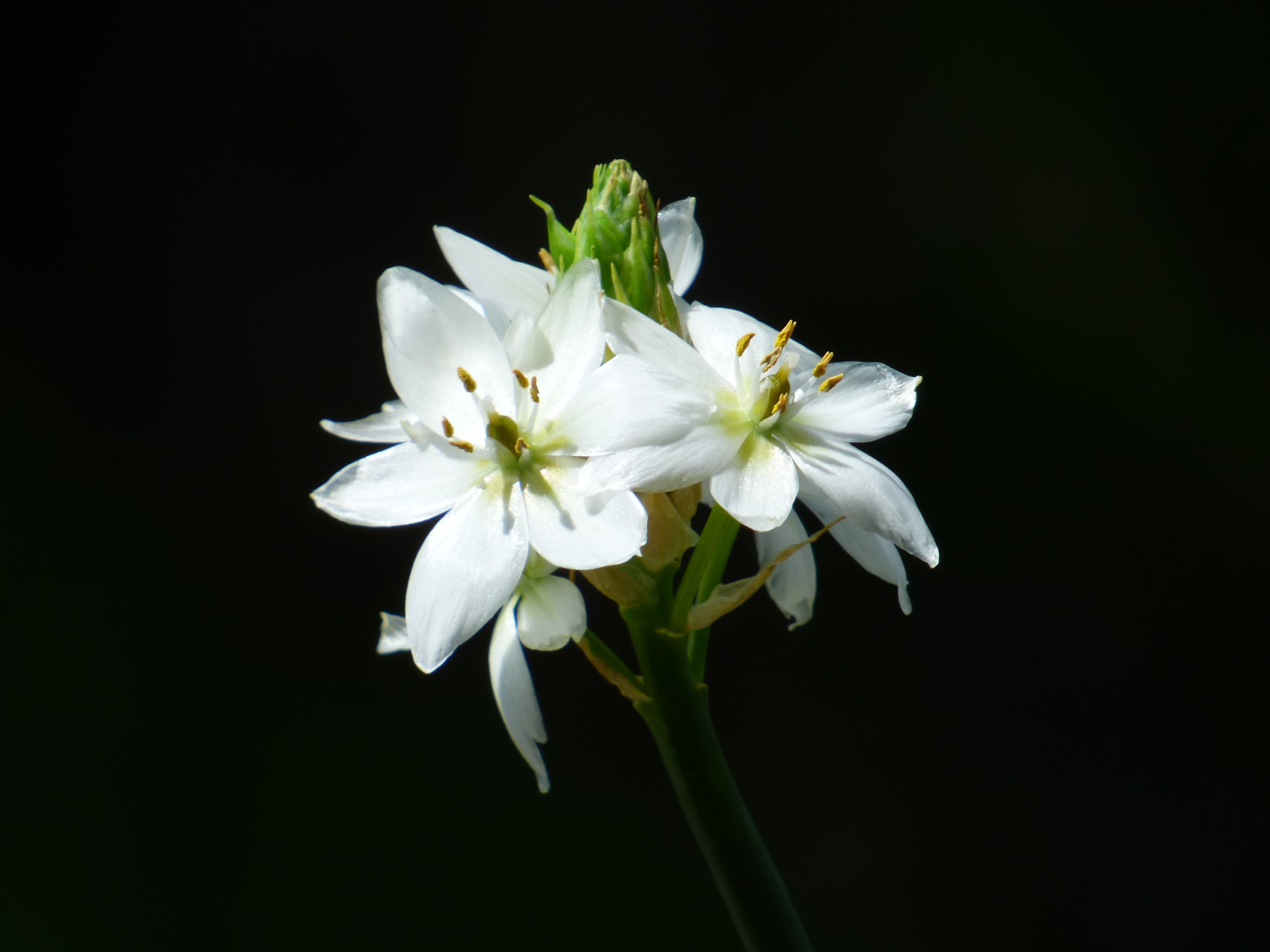
O. thyrsoides

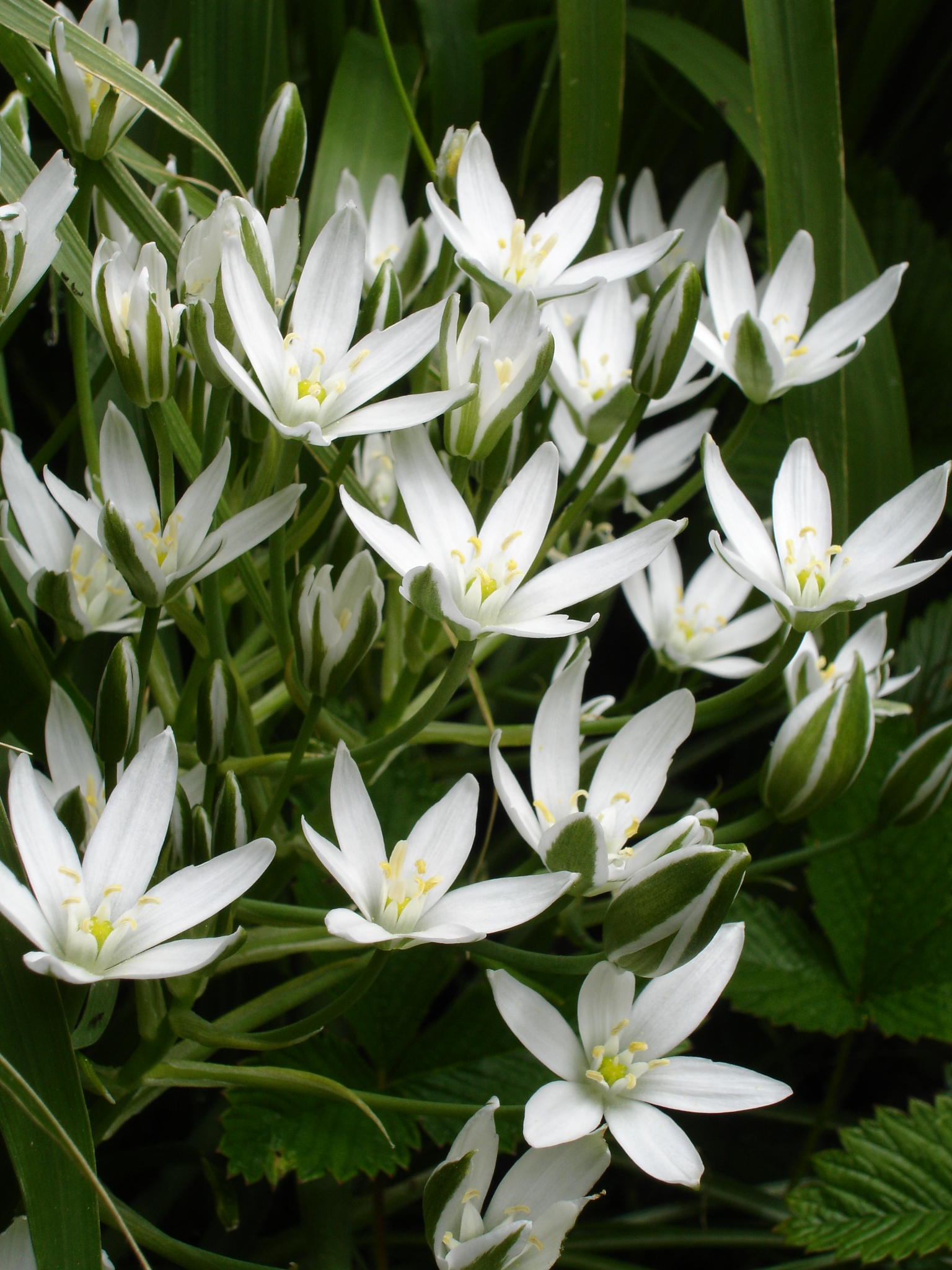
O. umbellatum

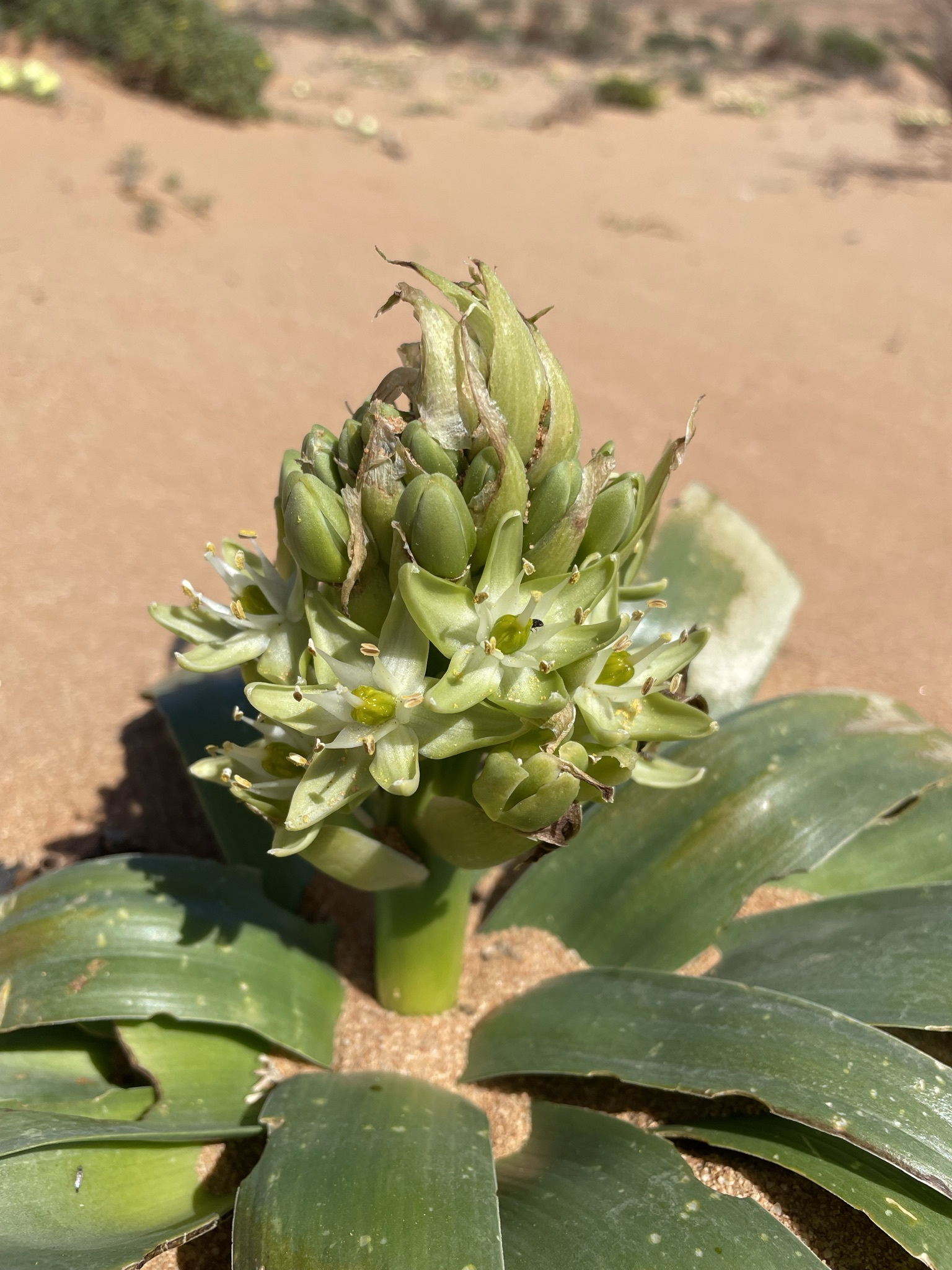
O. xanthochlorum

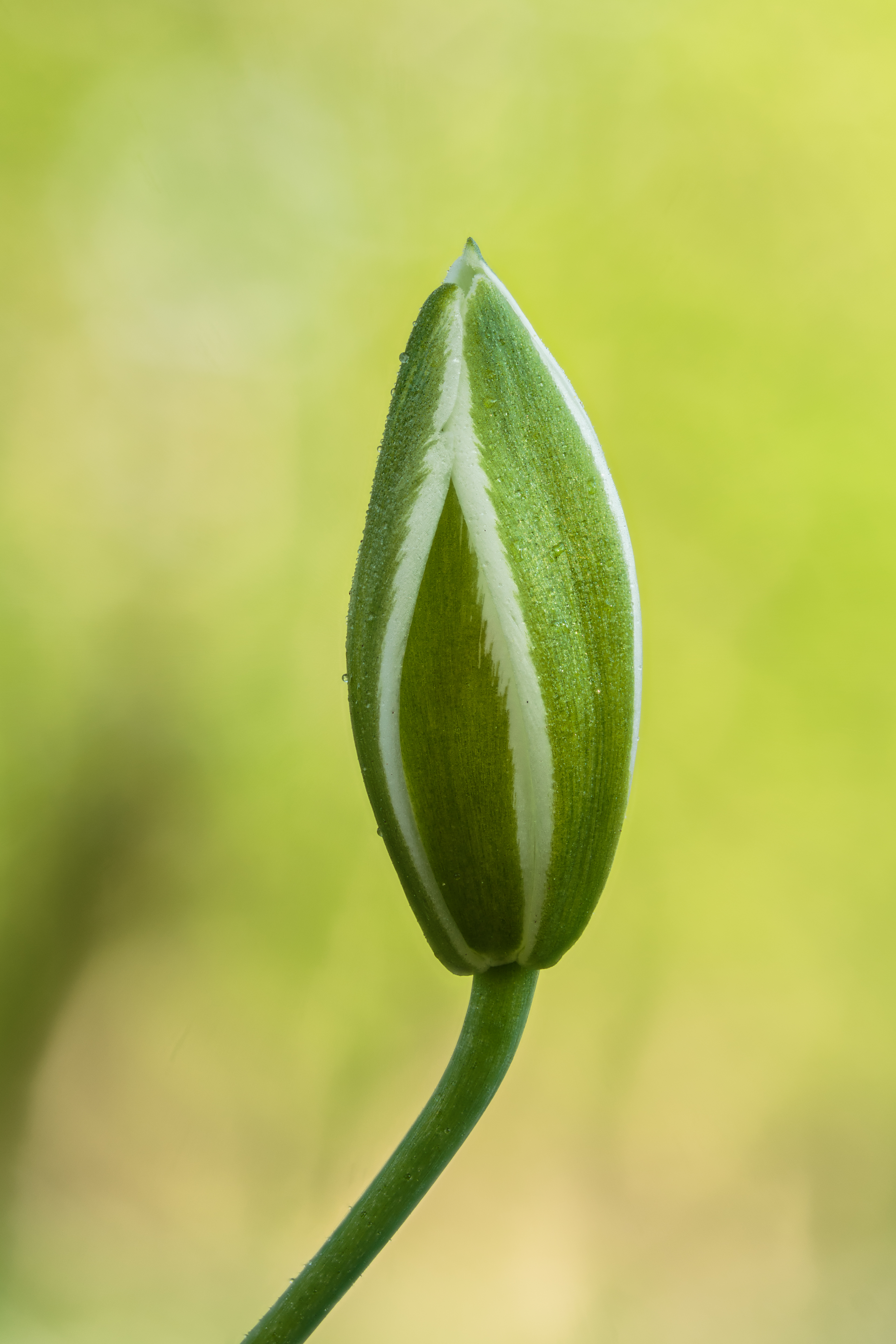
Closed flower bud

== See also ==
- Taxonomy of Liliaceae

== Bibliography ==
- Garbari, F; Giordani, A; Marcucci, R; Tomadore, N (2003). "The genus Ornithogalum L. (Hyacinthaceae) in Italy, XIV: Towards a redefinition of infrageneric taxa, with new proposals" (PDF). Bocconea. 16 (1): 269–281.
- Gilbert-Carter, H. (1955). Glossary of the British Flora (2nd ed.). Cambridge University Press.
- Kubitzki, K., ed. (1998). The families and genera of vascular plants. Vol.3 Monocotyledons: Lilianae (except Orchidaceae). Berlin, Germany: Springer-Verlag. ISBN 978-3-540-64060-8.
- Liddell, H.G.; Scott, R. (1940). A Greek-English Lexicon. Revised and augmented throughout by Sir Henry Stuart Jones with the assistance of Roderick McKenzie. Oxford: Clarendon Press.
- Manning, J.C.; Goldblatt, P.; Fay, M.F. (2004). "A revised generic synopsis of Hyacinthaceae in sub-Saharan Africa, based on molecular evidence, including new combinations and the new tribe Pseudoprospereae". Edinburgh Journal of Botany. 60 (3): 533–568. doi:10.1017/S0960428603000404. S2CID 86097586.
- Manning JC, Forest F, Devey DS, Fay MF, Goldblatt P (2009). "A molecular phylogeny and a revised classification of Ornithogaloideae (Hyacinthaceae) based on an analysis of four placid DNA regions". Taxon. 58 (1): 77–107. doi:10.1002/tax.581011. JSTOR 27756826.
- Martínez-Azorín, Mario; Crespo, Manuel B.; Spencer, Mark (November 2006). "Typification of names of taxa in Ornithogalum L. subg. Cathissa (Salisb.) Baker ( Hyacinthaceae )". Taxon. 55 (4): 1014–1018. doi:10.2307/25065699. JSTOR 25065699.
- Martínez-Azorín, Mario; Crespo, Manuel B.; Ana Juan, Ana (2007). "Taxonomic revision of Ornithogalum subgen. Cathissa (Salisb.) Baker (Hyacinthaceae)". Anales del Jardín Botánico de Madrid. 64 (1): 7–25. doi:10.3989/ajbm.2007.v64.i1.47. hdl:10045/22450. ISSN 0211-1322.
- Martinez-Azorin, Mario; Crespo, Manuel B.; Juan, Ana (2009). "Taxonomic revision of Ornithogalum subg. Beryllis (Hyacinthaceae) in the Iberian Peninsula and the Balearic Islands". Belg. J. Bot. 142 (2): 139–161.
- Martínez-Azorín, Mario; Crespo, Manuel B.; Juan, Ana (23 September 2010). "Taxonomic revision of Ornithogalum subg. Ornithogalum (Hyacinthaceae) in the Iberian Peninsula and the Balearic Islands". Plant Systematics and Evolution. 289 (3–4): 181–211. Bibcode:2010PSyEv.289..181M. doi:10.1007/s00606-010-0343-9. S2CID 28222390.
- Martinez-Azorin, Mario; Crespo, Manuel B.; Juan, Ana; Fay, Michael F. (2011). "Molecular phylogenetics of subfamily Ornithogaloideae (Hyacinthaceae) based on nuclear and plastid DNA regions, including a new taxonomic arrangement". Annals of Botany. 107 (1): 1–37. doi:10.1093/aob/mcq207. PMC 3002468. PMID 21163815.
- Obermeyer, A. A. (1978). "Ornithogalum: a revision of the southern African species". Bothalia. 12 (3): 323–376. doi:10.4102/abc.v12i3.1793.
- Schubert, R.; Wagner, G. (1988). Botanisches Wörterbuch (9th ed.). Stuttgart: Gustav Fischer.
- Speta, F. "Hyacinthaceae". In Kubitzki (1998), pp. 261–285.
- Stedje, Brita; Nordal, Inger (December 1984). "Taxonomy and cytology of the genus Ornithogalum (Liliaceae) in East Africa". Nordic Journal of Botany. 4 (6): 749–759. doi:10.1111/j.1756-1051.1984.tb02004.x.
- Stedje, Brita (1989). "Chromosome evolution within the Ornithogalum tenuifolium complex (Hyacinthaceae), with special emphasis on the evolution of bimodal karyotypes". Plant Systematics and Evolution. 166 (1–2): 79–89. Bibcode:1989PSyEv.166...79S. doi:10.1007/BF00937877. S2CID 30809941.
- Tutin, T. G.; Heywood, V H; Burges, N. A.; Moore, D. M.; Valentine, D. H.; Walters, S. M.; Webb, D. A., eds. (1980). Flora Europaea. Volume 5, Alismataceae to Orchidaceae (monocotyledones). Cambridge, England: Cambridge University Press. pp. 35–40. ISBN 0-521-20108-X. (see also Flora Europaea)(available here at Internet Archive)
- Vohra, D.S. (2005). Bach Flower Remedies: A Comprehensive Study. B. Jain Publishers. ISBN 978-81-7021-271-3.

=== Historical sources ===
- Adanson, Michel (1763). "VIII Liliaceae IV Cepae". Familles des plantes Part II. Vol. v. 1-2. Paris: Vincent.
- Baker, JG (1871). "A revision of the genera and species of herbaceous gamophyllous Liliaceae". Journal of the Linnean Society, Botany. 11 (54–55): 349–436. doi:10.1111/j.1095-8339.1870.tb00068.x.
- Baker, JG (1873). "Revision of the genera and species of Scilleae and Chlorogaleae". Journal of the Linnean Society, Botany. 13 (68): 209–292. doi:10.1111/j.1095-8339.1872.tb00093.x.
- Bentham, G.; Hooker, J.D. (1883). Genera plantarum ad exemplaria imprimis in herbariis kewensibus servata definita. Vol III Part II. London: L Reeve & Co.
- Engler, Adolf; Prantl, Karl, eds. (1888). Die Natürlichen Pflanzenfamilien nebst ihren Gattungen und wichtigeren Arten, insbesondere den Nutzpflanzen, unter Mitwirkung zahlreicher hervorragender Fachgelehrten 1887–1915 II(5). Leipzig: W. Engelmann.
- Linnaeus, Carl (1753). Species Plantarum: exhibentes plantas rite cognitas, ad genera relatas, cum differentiis specificis, nominibus trivialibus, synonymis selectis, locis natalibus, secundum systema sexuale digestas. Stockholm: Impensis Laurentii Salvii.
- Saalfeld, G.A.E.A. (1884). Tensaurus Italograecus. Ausführliches historisch-kritisches Wörterbuch der Griechischen Lehn- und Fremdwörter im Lateinischen. Wien: Carl Gerold's Sohn.

=== Databases ===
- "Ornithogalum". The Plant List. Version 1.1. 2013.
- "Ornithogalum L". International Plant Names Index. 2005.
- "Ornithogalum". World Checklist of Selected Plant Families. Royal Botanic Gardens, Kew.
- "Ornithogalum L". eMonocot. 2014. Archived from the original on 1 January 2015. Distribution maps
- "Ornithogalum". Euro+Med Plantbase. Botanic Garden and Botanical Museum Berlin-Dahlem. 2011.
- Stevens, P.F. (2015) [2001]. "Ornithogaleae". Angiosperm Phylogeny Website.
