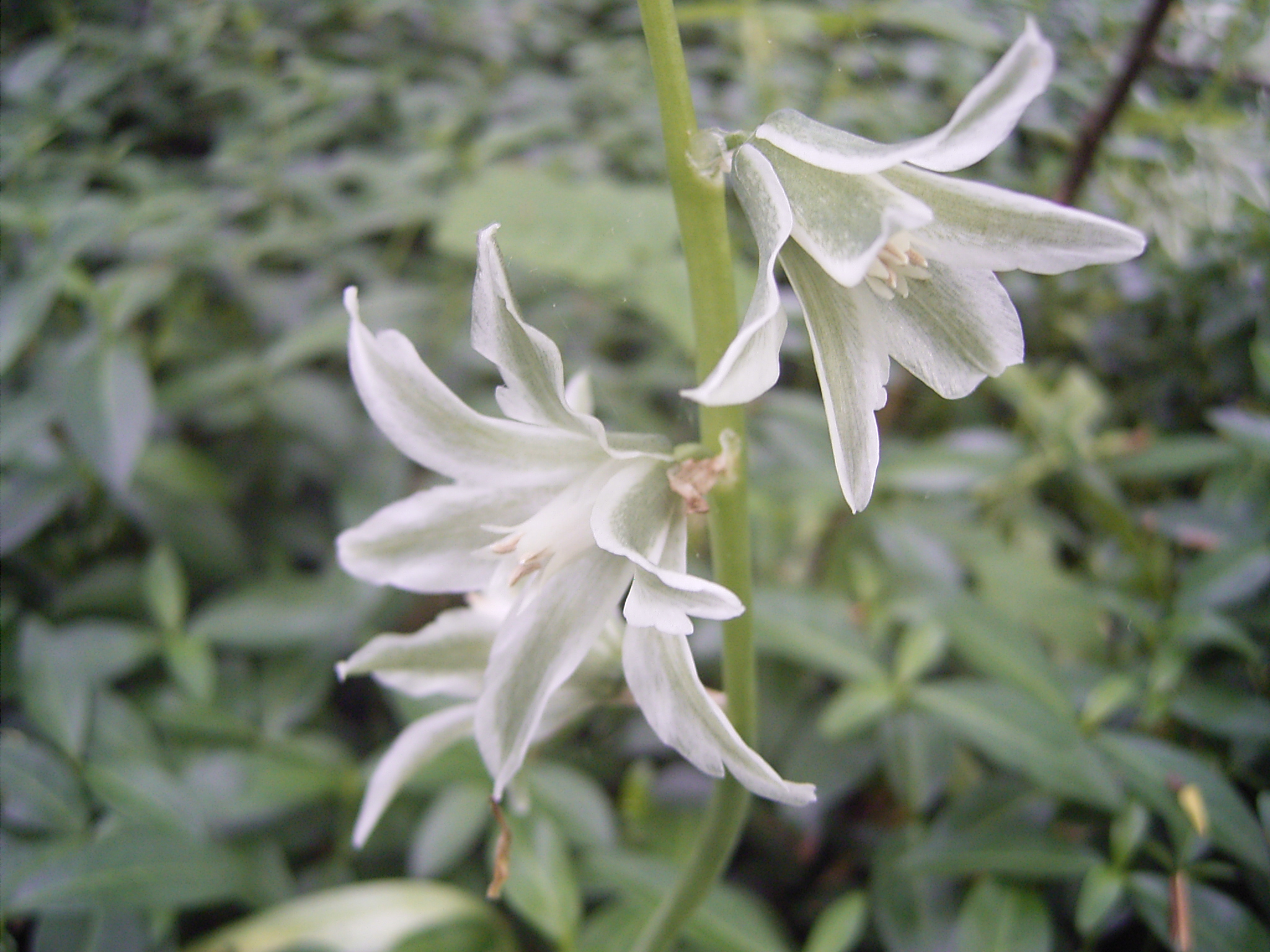

Scientific classification
- Kingdom: Plantae
- Clade: Tracheophytes
- Clade: Angiosperms
- Clade: Monocots
- Order: Asparagales
- Family: Asparagaceae
- Subfamily: Scilloideae
- Genus: Ornithogalum
- Species: O. nutans

Binomial name
- Ornithogalum nutans L.

Synonyms
- list: Albucea chlorantha Rchb.; Albucea neapolitana Montandon; Albucea nutans (L.) Rchb.; Brizophila nutans (L.) Salisb. nom. inval.; Honorius nutans (L.) Gray; Honorius prasandrus (Griseb.) Holub; Hyacinthus myogalea E.H.L.Krause; Ifuon nutans (L.) Raf.; Myogalum affine K.Koch & C.D.Bouché; Myogalum nutans (L.) Link; Myogalum prasandrum (Griseb.) Walp.; Myogalum thirkeanum K.Koch; Ornithogalum asernii Velen.; Ornithogalum chloranthum Saut. ex W.D.J.Koch nom. illeg.; Ornithogalum prasandrum Griseb.

= Ornithogalum nutans =

Species of flowering plant

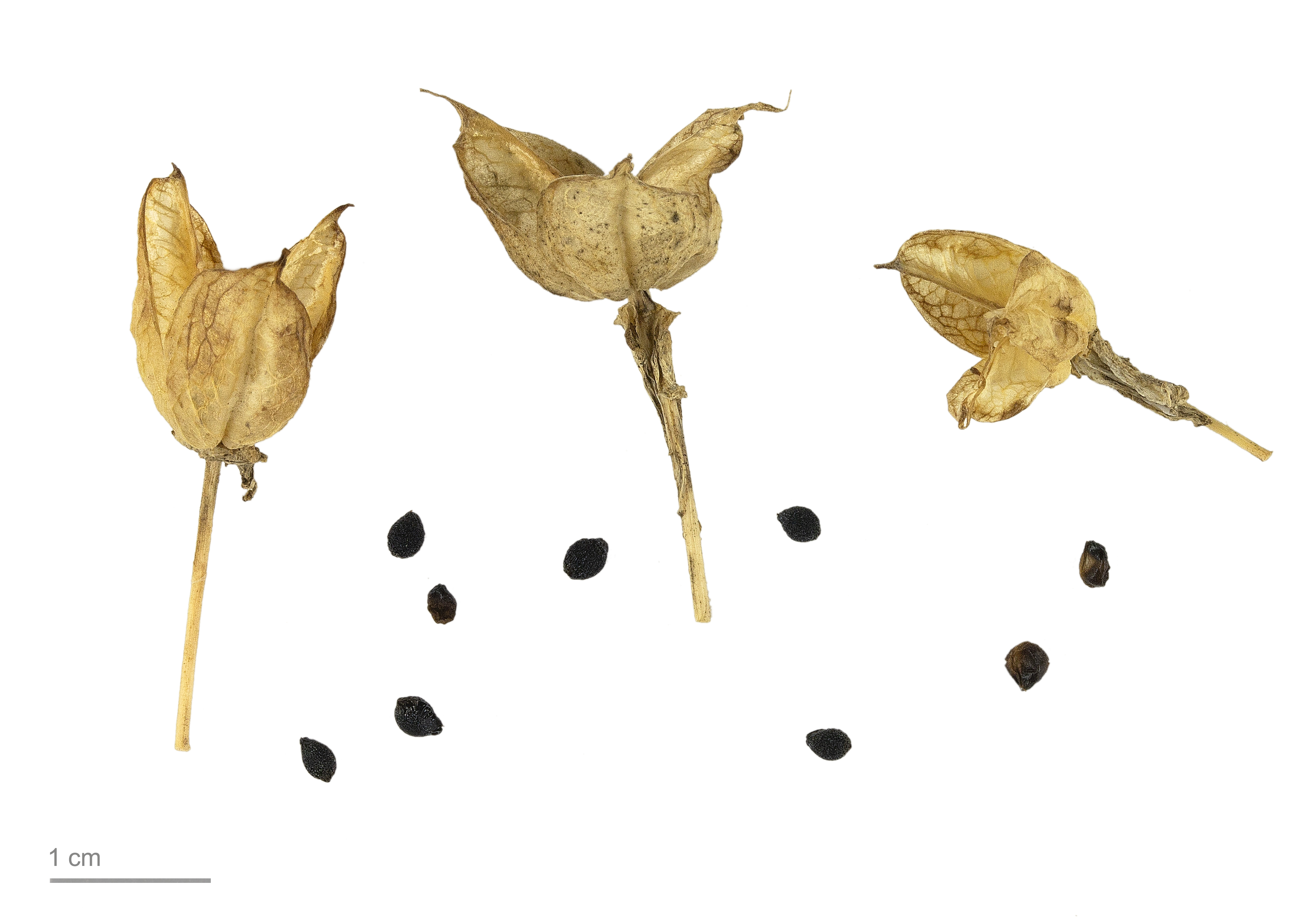
Ornithogalum nutans MHNT

Ornithogalum nutans, known as drooping star-of-Bethlehem, is a species of flowering plant in the family Asparagaceae, native to Europe and South West Asia. It is a bulbous perennial growing to 20–60 cm (8–24 in) tall by 5 cm (2 in) wide, with strap-shaped leaves and green striped, pendent grey-white flowers in spring. It is cultivated, and has naturalized, outside its native range, for example in North America. It has become extremely invasive along the Chesapeake and Ohio Canal in Maryland. At least in North America, it is not as common as Ornithogalum umbellatum.

The specific epithet nutans means "nodding", referring to the flowers' slightly drooping habit.

O. nutans is hardy to USDA Zones 6–10. It has gained the Royal Horticultural Society's Award of Garden Merit.
