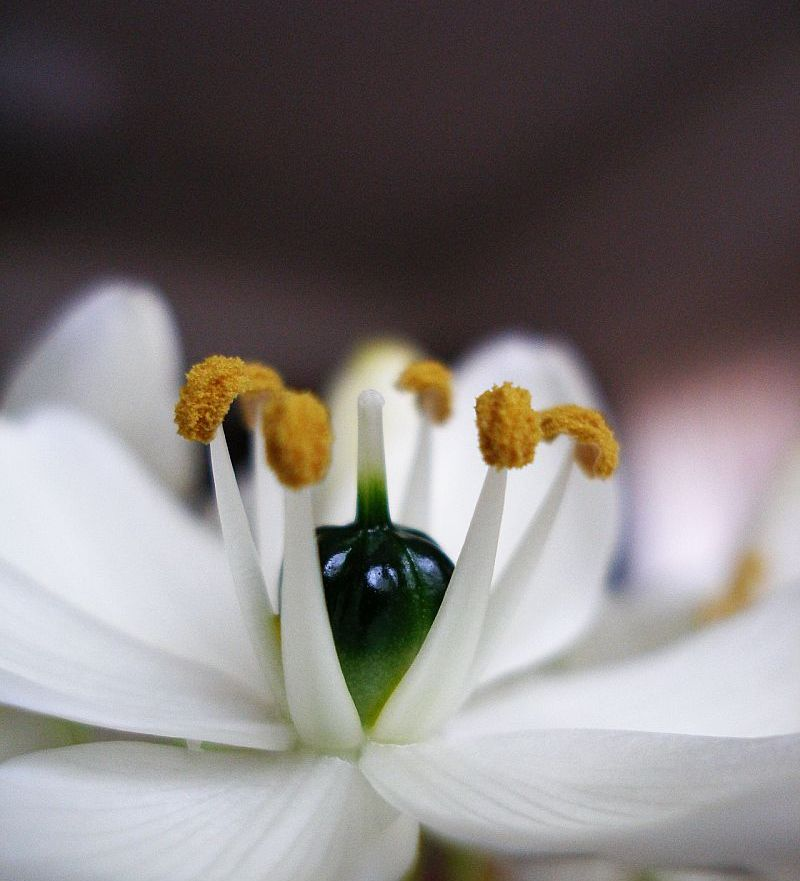

Scientific classification
- Kingdom: Plantae
- Clade: Tracheophytes
- Clade: Angiosperms
- Clade: Monocots
- Order: Asparagales
- Family: Asparagaceae
- Subfamily: Scilloideae
- Tribe: Ornithogaleae
- Genus: Ornithogalum
- Species: O. arabicum

Binomial name
- Ornithogalum arabicum L.

Synonyms
- Caruelia algeriensis Jord.; Caruelia arabica (L.) Parl.; Caruelia hipponensis Jord.; Caruelia macrocoma Jord.; Caruelia ochroleuca Jord.; Caruelia stenopetala Jord.; Eliokarmos aureum Raf.; Eustachys latifolia (L.) Salisb. nom. inval.; Loncomelos latifolium (L.) Raf.; Melomphis arabica (L.) Raf.; Melomphis patens Raf.; Myanthe arabica (L.) Salisb. nom. inval.; Ornithogalum corymbosum Ruiz & Pav. nom. illeg.; Ornithogalum latifolium L.; Ornithogalum speciosum Salisb. nom. illeg.; Stellaris latifolia (L.) Moench

= Ornithogalum arabicum =

Species of flowering plant

Ornithogalum arabicum is a species of star of Bethlehem native to northern Africa and southern Europe. Common names include Arab's eye, lesser cape-lily, and Arabian starflower.

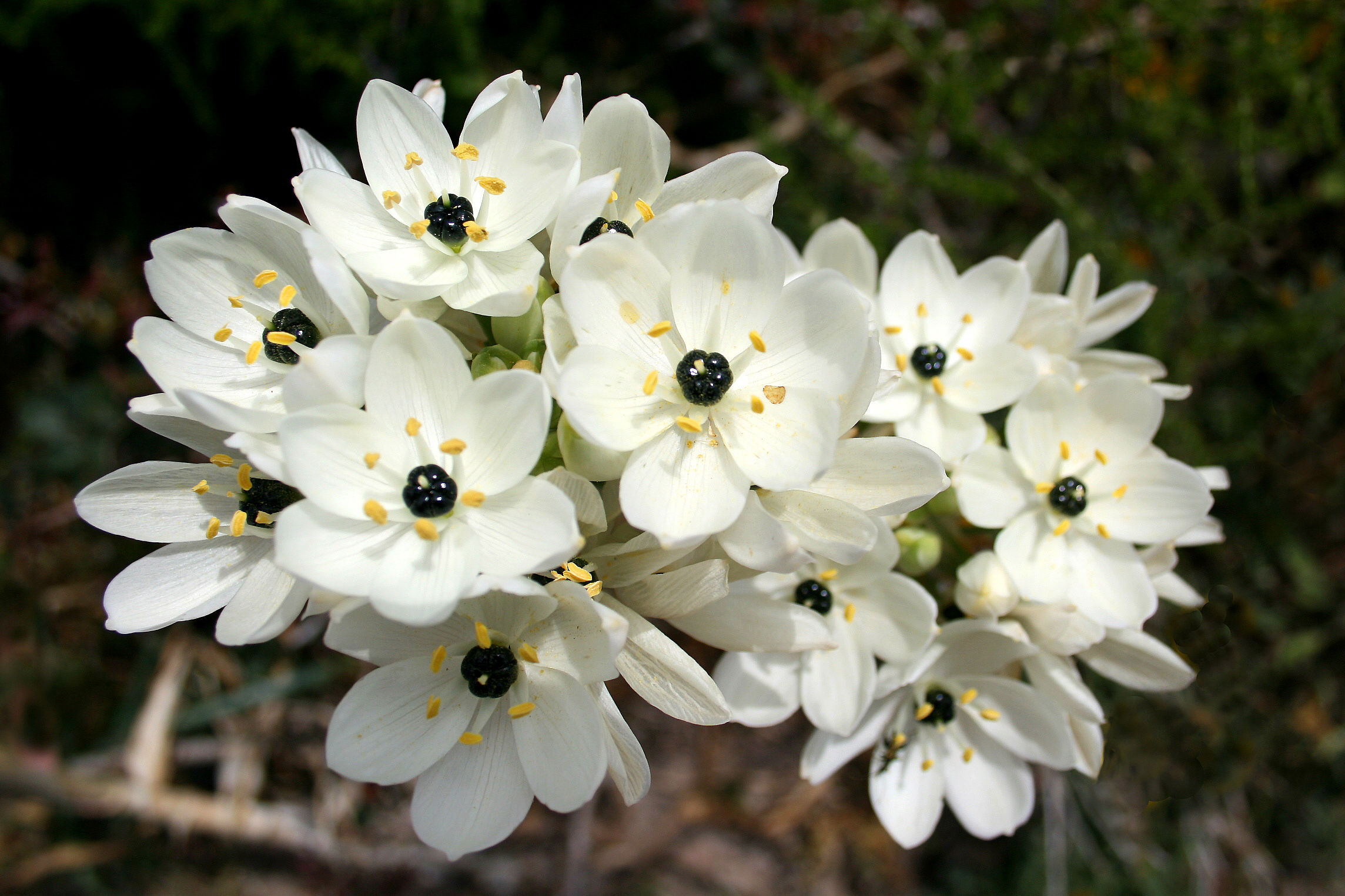
