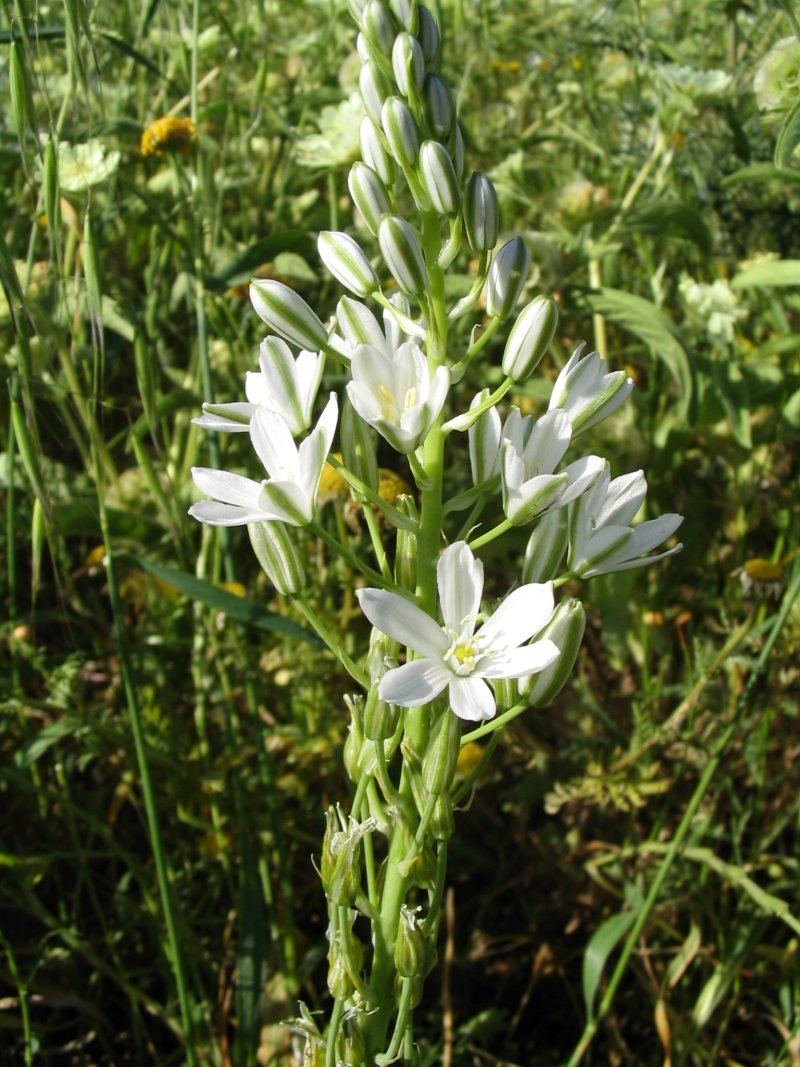

Scientific classification
- Kingdom: Plantae
- Clade: Tracheophytes
- Clade: Angiosperms
- Clade: Monocots
- Order: Asparagales
- Family: Asparagaceae
- Subfamily: Scilloideae
- Genus: Ornithogalum
- Species: O. narbonense

Binomial name
- Ornithogalum narbonense L.

Synonyms
- List: Eremurus iranicus Parsa; Loncomelos brachystachys (K.Koch) Speta; Loncomelos brachystylum (Zahar.) Speta; Loncomelos israelense Ravenna; Loncomelos narbonense (L.) Raf.; Loncomelos prasinantherum (Zahar.) Speta; Ornithogalum arabicum Brot. nom. illeg.; Ornithogalum brachystachys K.Koch; Ornithogalum brachystylum Zahar.; Ornithogalum densum Boiss. & Blanche; Ornithogalum lacteum Vill.; Ornithogalum monspeliense Gueldenst.; Ornithogalum prasinantherum Zahar.; Ornithogalum stachyoides Aiton; Ornithogalum trigynum Delile; Parthenostachys narbonensis (L.) Fourr.; Scilla montana Savi

= Ornithogalum narbonense =

Species of flowering plant

Ornithogalum narbonense, common names Narbonne star-of-Bethlehem, pyramidal star-of-Bethlehem and southern star-of-Bethlehem, is a herbaceous perennial flowering plant with underground bulbs, belonging to the genus Ornithogalum of the family Asparagaceae. The Latin name Ornithogalum of the genus, meaning "bird's milk", derives from the Greek, while the species name narbonense refers to the French town of Narbonne.

== Description ==
Ornithogalum narbonense reaches on average 40–50 centimetres (16–20 in) of height, with a maximum of 70 centimetres (28 in). The bulbs are whitish and ovoid. The stems are erect and the long leaves are fleshy and lance-shaped, 8–15 millimetres (0.31–0.59 in) wide. The raceme is pyramidal, with 25-75 hermaphrodite flowers. Each flower has a long bract of 1–2 centimetres (0.39–0.79 in) and six star-shaped milky white petals bearing a pale green central vein, while the buds are oval, with longitudinal green and white stripes. The six stamens have a white filament holding yellow anthers of 4 millimetres (0.16 in). The flowers are pollinated by insects. The flowering period extends from May through June.

== Gallery ==
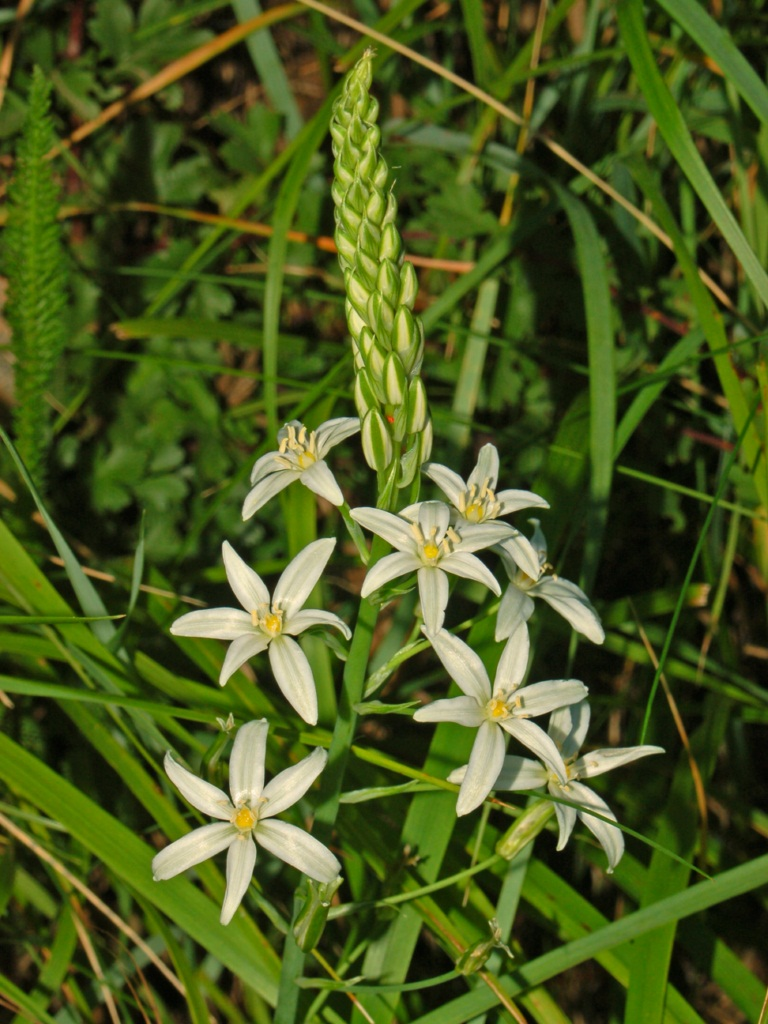
Inflorescence of Ornithogalum narbonense

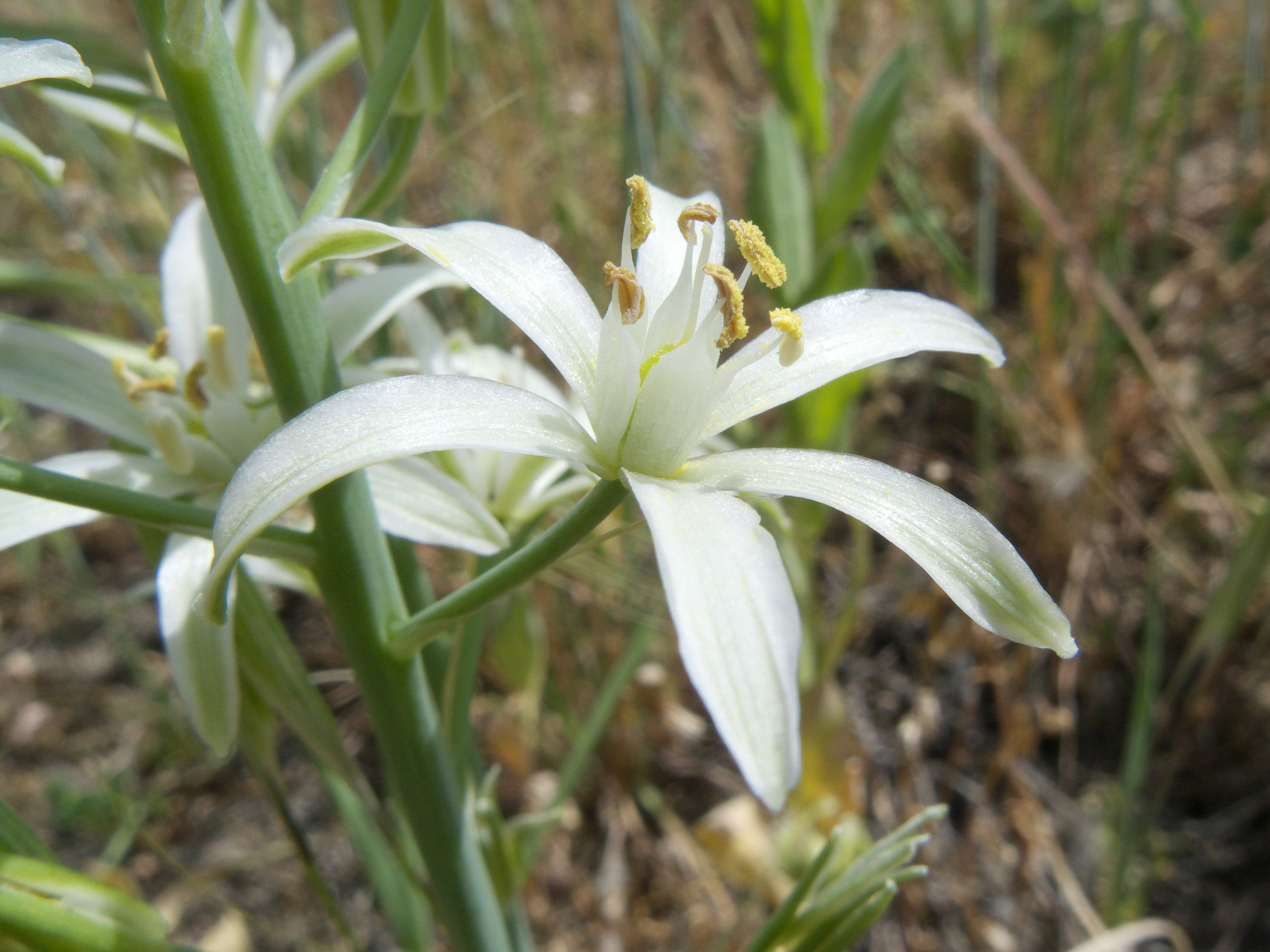
Close-up on a flower of Ornithogalum narbonense

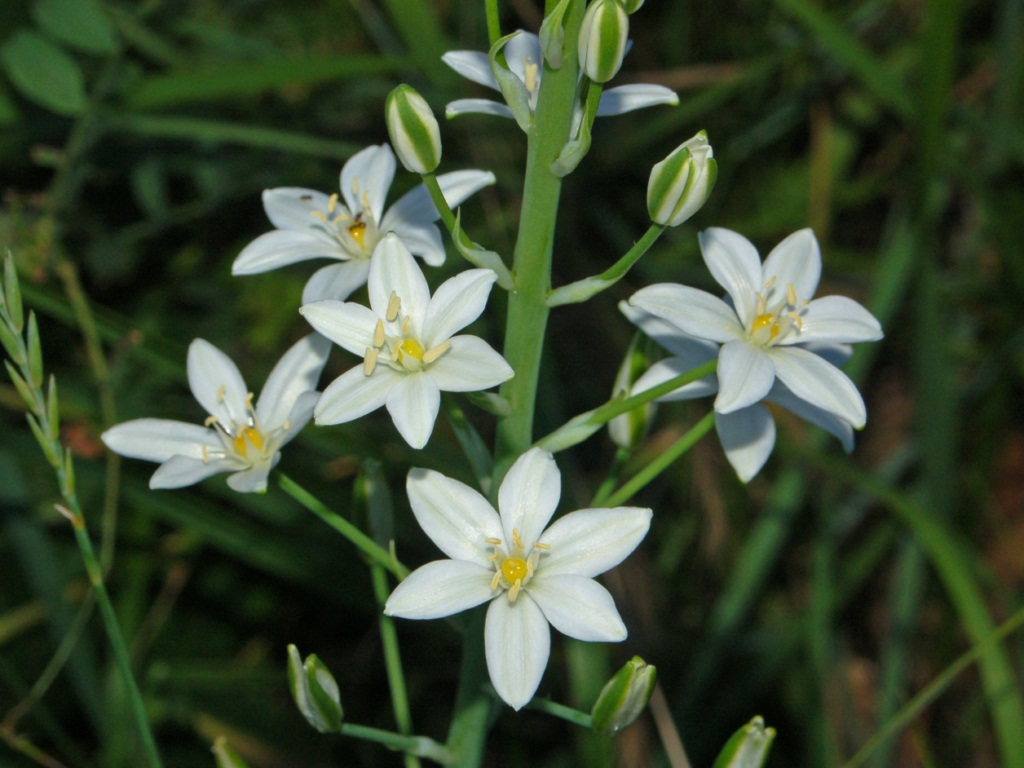
Flowers of Ornithogalum narbonense

== Distribution ==
This species is present in the Mediterranean Basin, Armenia and northwestern Iran.

== Habitat ==
This plant grows in fields and grassy and dry areas, in waste ground and in rocky terrains. In the south-east of its range it can be found at an altitude of 0–3,000 metres (0–9,843 ft) above sea level; in Crete at 0–1,150 metres (0–3,773 ft).
