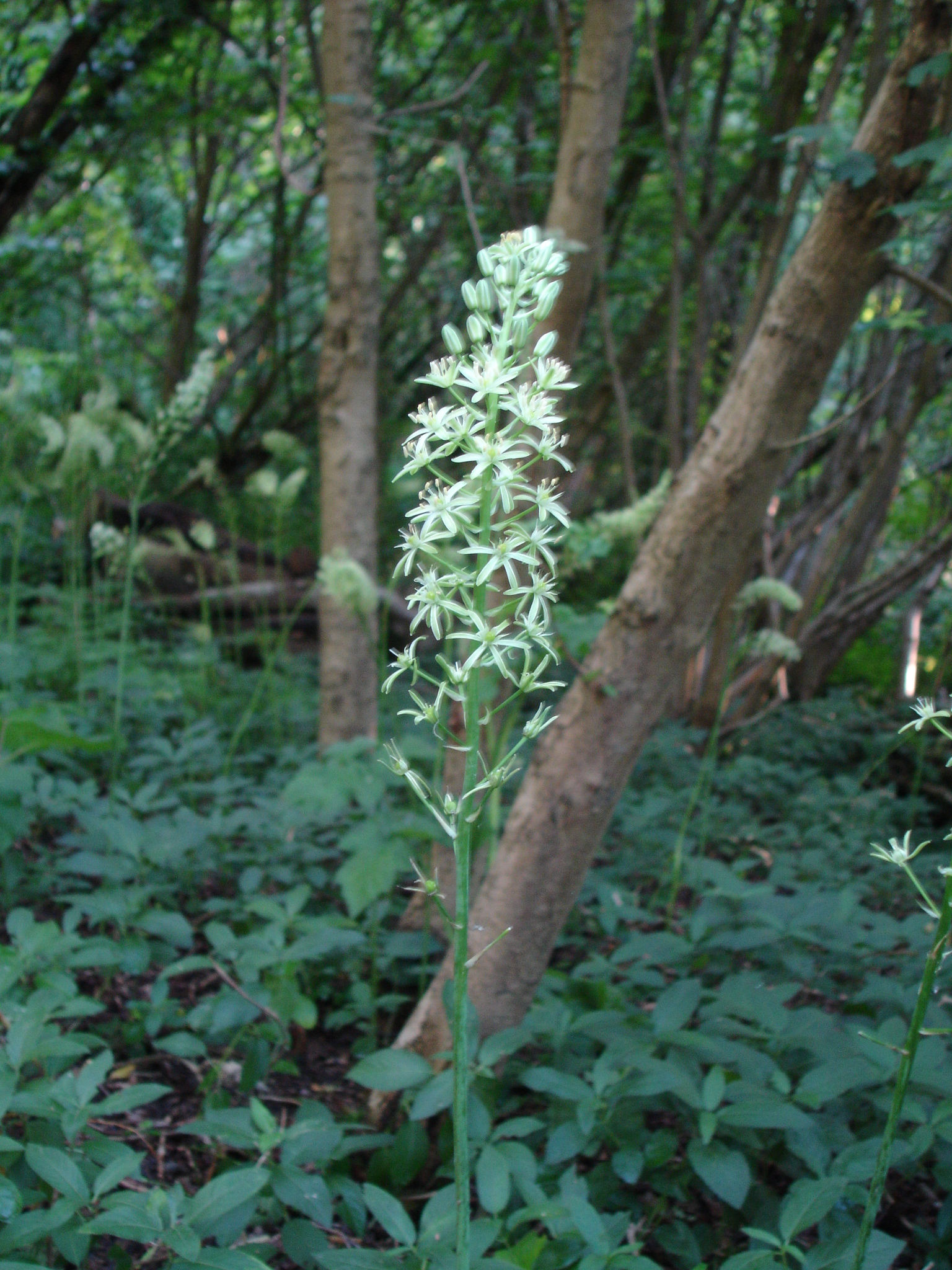
- Flowering Bath asparagus in Clout's Wood, Wroughton

Scientific classification
- Kingdom: Plantae
- Clade: Tracheophytes
- Clade: Angiosperms
- Clade: Monocots
- Order: Asparagales
- Family: Asparagaceae
- Subfamily: Scilloideae
- Tribe: Ornithogaleae
- Genus: Ornithogalum
- Species: O. pyrenaicum

Binomial name
- Ornithogalum pyrenaicum L.

Synonyms
- Anthericum sulphureum Waldst. & Kit.; Beryllis pyrenaica (L.) Salisb. nom. inval.; Hyacinthus sulphureus (Waldst. & Kit.) E.H.L.Krause nom. illeg.; Loncomelos pallidum (Salisb.) Speta; Loncomelos pyrenaicum (L.) J.Holub; Loncoxis sulphurea (Waldst. & Kit.) Raf.; Ornithogalum asphodeloides Schur; Ornithogalum flavescens Lam. nom. illeg.; Ornithogalum granatense Pau; Ornithogalum melancholicum Klokov ex Krasnova; Ornithogalum ochroleucum Montandon; Ornithogalum pallidum Salisb.; Ornithogalum racemosum Gaterau; Ornithogalum sulphureum (Waldst. & Kit.) Schult. & Schult.f.; Parthenostachys pyrenaica (L.) Fourr.; Phalangium sulphureum (Waldst. & Kit.) Poir.; Scilla sylvestris Savi; Stellaris erecta Moench

= Ornithogalum pyrenaicum =

Species of flowering plant

Ornithogalum pyrenaicum, also called Prussian asparagus, wild asparagus, Bath asparagus, Pyrenees star of Bethlehem, or spiked star of Bethlehem, is a plant whose young flower shoots may be eaten as a vegetable, similar to asparagus.

The common name Bath asparagus comes from the fact it was once abundant near the city of the same name in England.

== Cultivation History ==
Cato the Elder recommends growing wild asparagus in his treatise De agri cultura.
