= Robert Moss (English cricketer) =

English cricketer, soldier and businessman

Personal information
- Full name: Robert Francis Moss
- Born: 13 July 1914; Godden Green, Kent, England
- Died: 16 January 1977 (aged 62); Saint Anne, Alderney
- Batting: Right-handed
- Relatives: Edward Moss (brother)

Domestic team information
- Years: Team
- 1937/38–1939/40: Bombay
- 1937/38–1941/42: Europeans

Career statistics
Competition	First-class
Matches	9
Runs scored	258
Batting average	18.42
100s/50s	–/1
Top score	54
Catches/stumpings	7/–
- Source: Cricinfo, 12 December 2022

Robert Francis Moss MBE (13 July 1914 — 16 January 1977) was an English first-class cricketer and British Indian Army officer.

The son of William Henry Moss and his wife, Rose Winifred Moss, he was born at Godden Green in Kent. He was educated at Malvern College, before proceeding to British India. There, he played cricket, making his debut in first-class cricket for Bombay against Gujarat at Jamnagar in the 1937–38 Ranji Trophy. He followed this up a couple of months later with an appearance for the Europeans cricket team against the Cricket Club of India. He played first-class cricket on eight occasions in India prior to serving in the Second World War, making eight appearances; two came for Bombay, whilst seven came for the Europeans. Moss was an emergency commission with King Edward VII's Own Gurkha Rifles, and following the end of the war he was made an MBE in December 1945. Moss made a further appearance in first-class cricket in November 1946, when he captained S. A. Shete's XI against A. A. Jasdenwala's XI at Bombay. In nine first-class matches, he scored 258 runs at an average of 18.42; he made one half century score of 54, which came for the Europeans against the Hindus in the 1939–40 Bombay Pentangular.

Later returning to England, where he belonged to the Reserve of Officers, he was promoted to captain in June 1952, and was concurrently made an honorary major. Moss later moved to Jersey, where he was the director of J. De Ackary & Company Limited. He died in January 1977 at Saint Anne, Alderney. His brother, Edward, was also a first-class cricketer.
