= Sophia Law =

Sophia Law may refer to:

- Sophia Grieve, née Sophia Law, herbalist and horticulturist
- Sophia Law (daughter of Jude Law)
- Sophia Law School, at Sophia University
