= Margaret Brownlow =

English gardener and writer (1916–1968)

- Born: 1916; West Kirby, England
- Died: 17 February 1968 (aged 51–52)
- Occupations: Gardener, writer, illustrator
- Years active: 1933-1968

Margaret Eileen Brownlow (1916 – 1968) was an English illustrator, writer, herb farmer and garden designer.

== Life ==
Brownlow was born in 1916 in West Kirby on the Wirral. Her parents were Eva Annie (born Sutcliffe) and Richard Sydney Brownlow. Her father made stoneware.

In 1933 she started working at the Herb Farm in Seal, Kent which had been started in 1926 by Dorothy Hewer, and which received plants from Maud Grieve in 1929. The herb farm's crop supplied a culinary and medical mail order business and the business's London shop at 16 North Audley Street. Brownlow took an examination with the Royal Horticultural Society and then went to Reading University to take a BSc in horticulture. She passed the Royal Horticultural Society's national diploma in 1943. She then went to work at Waterperry Horticultural School before she returned to the Herb Farm where volumes had increased since she first worked there. Hewer's book Practical Herb Growing had been published in 1941.

In 1945, two years after Brownlow's return to Seal, she was appointed the Herb Farm's director. After Hewer died in 1948, Brownlow took over the Herb Farm. In 1949, the Herb Farm made its first appearance at the Chelsea Flower Show. Brownlow became known as a designer of gardens. Her design work included a herb garden at Knole country house in Kent which she created in 1963. She continued to exhibit at Chelsea Flower Show annually until she died. She wrote and illustrated Herbs and the Fragrant Garden which included her watercolours and her poems and advice based on her own experience. The book, privately published in 1957, described 300 plants, and advised on herbs and garden design. An enlarged edition was commercially published with 32 of her illustrations in 1963.

Brownlow published her autobiography, The Delights of Herb Growing, in 1965.

An open verdict was returned in 1968 after her body was found on 17 February 1968 poisoned by barbiturates.
