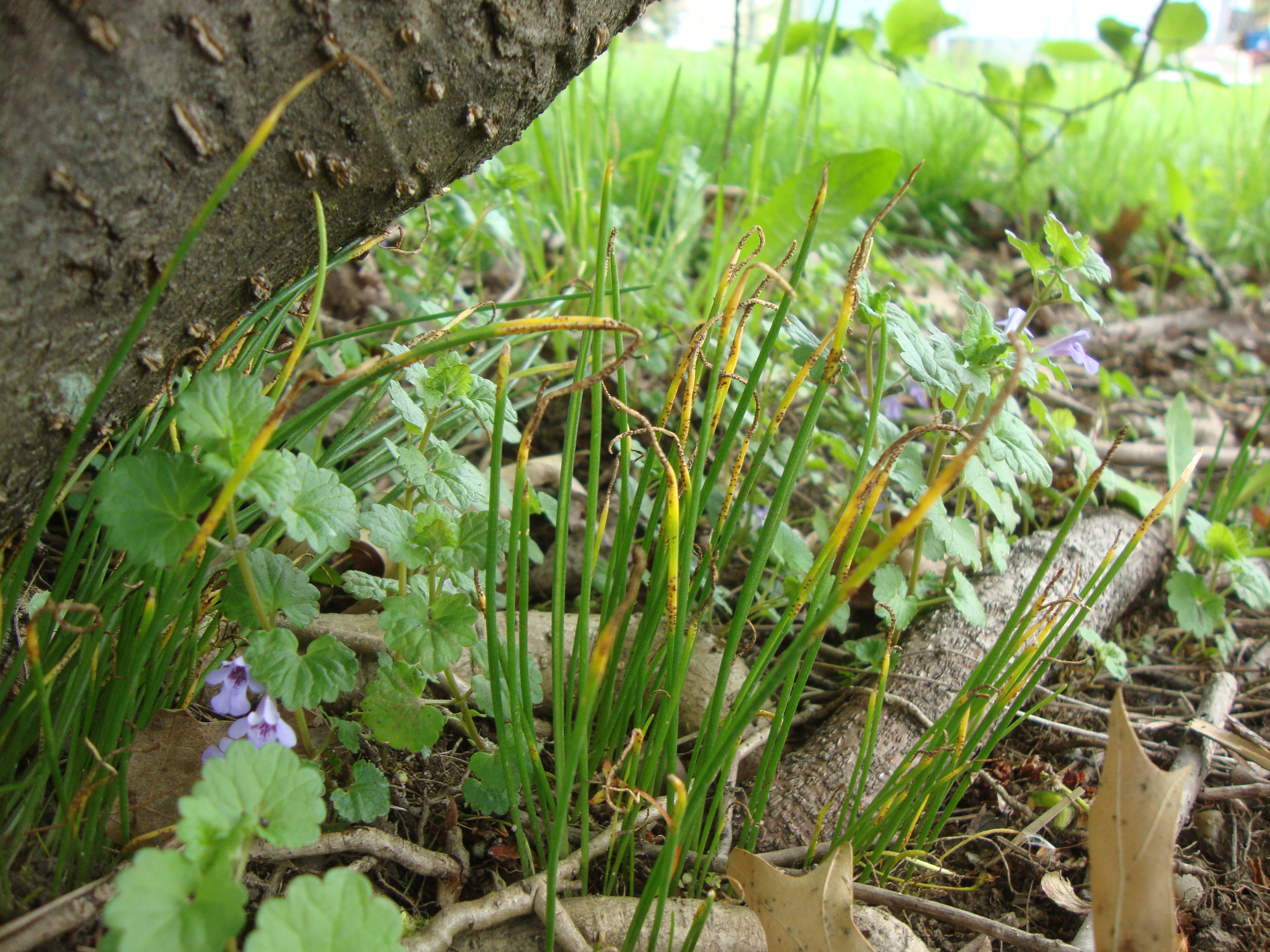
- Stand of Ornithogalum umbellatum infected with Puccinia liliacearum

Scientific classification
- Domain: Eukaryota
- Kingdom: Fungi
- Division: Basidiomycota
- Class: Pucciniomycetes
- Order: Pucciniales
- Family: Pucciniaceae
- Genus: Puccinia
- Species: P. liliacearum

Binomial name
- Puccinia liliacearum Duby

Synonyms
- Allodus liliacearum (Duby) Arthur, Résult. Sci. Congr. Bot. Wien 1905: 345 (1906); Dicaeoma liliacearum (Duby) Kuntze, Revis. gen. pl. (Leipzig) 3(3): 469 (1898)

= Puccinia liliacearum =

Species of fungus

Puccinia liliacearum is a fungal species and is commonly found as rust on Ornithogalum species. It is a microcyclic species lacking aecia and uredinia.

It was found on the bark of an unknown Liliaceae species and on Ornithogalum umbellatum in France, and then published and described by Jean Étienne Duby (1798-1885), in 1830.

It is common in Europe and Asia. It has been introduced to North America. In the United States of America, the first records are from New York in 1971 and Pennsylvania in 1972. It has since spread south to Maryland and east to Indiana.

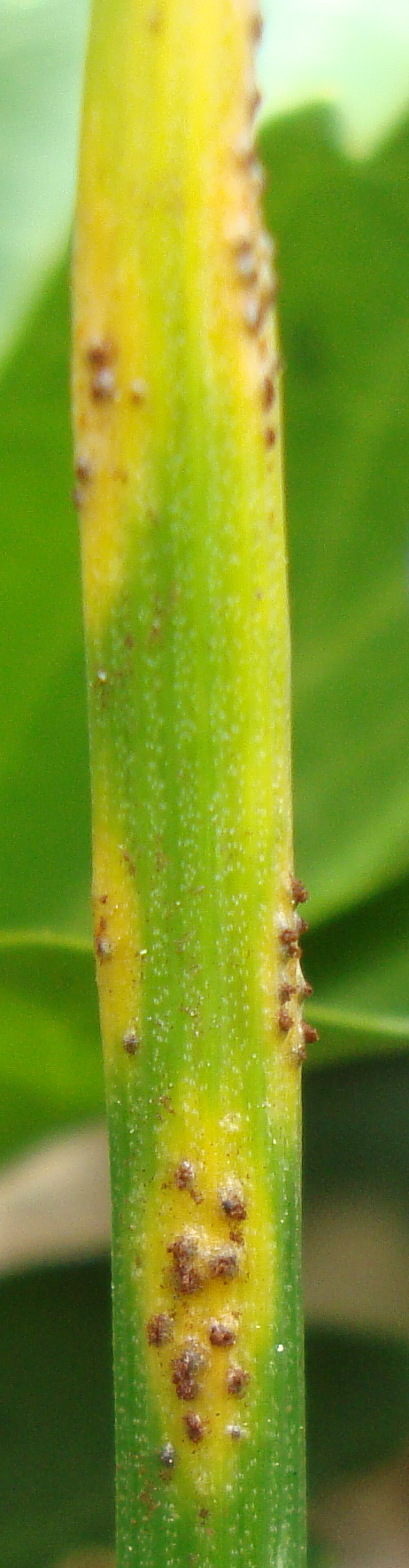
Close-up of black telia on an infected leaf of Ornithogalum umbellatum
