= Edward Moss =

Edward Moss may refer to:

- Edward Moss (impresario) (1852–1912), British theatre manager
- Edward Moss (impersonator) (born 1977), American actor, dancer, comedian, and Michael Jackson impersonator
- Edward Moss (politician) (1856–1916), member of parliament in New Zealand
- Edward Moss (cricketer) (1911–1944), English cricketer and Royal Air Force Volunteer Reserve officer
