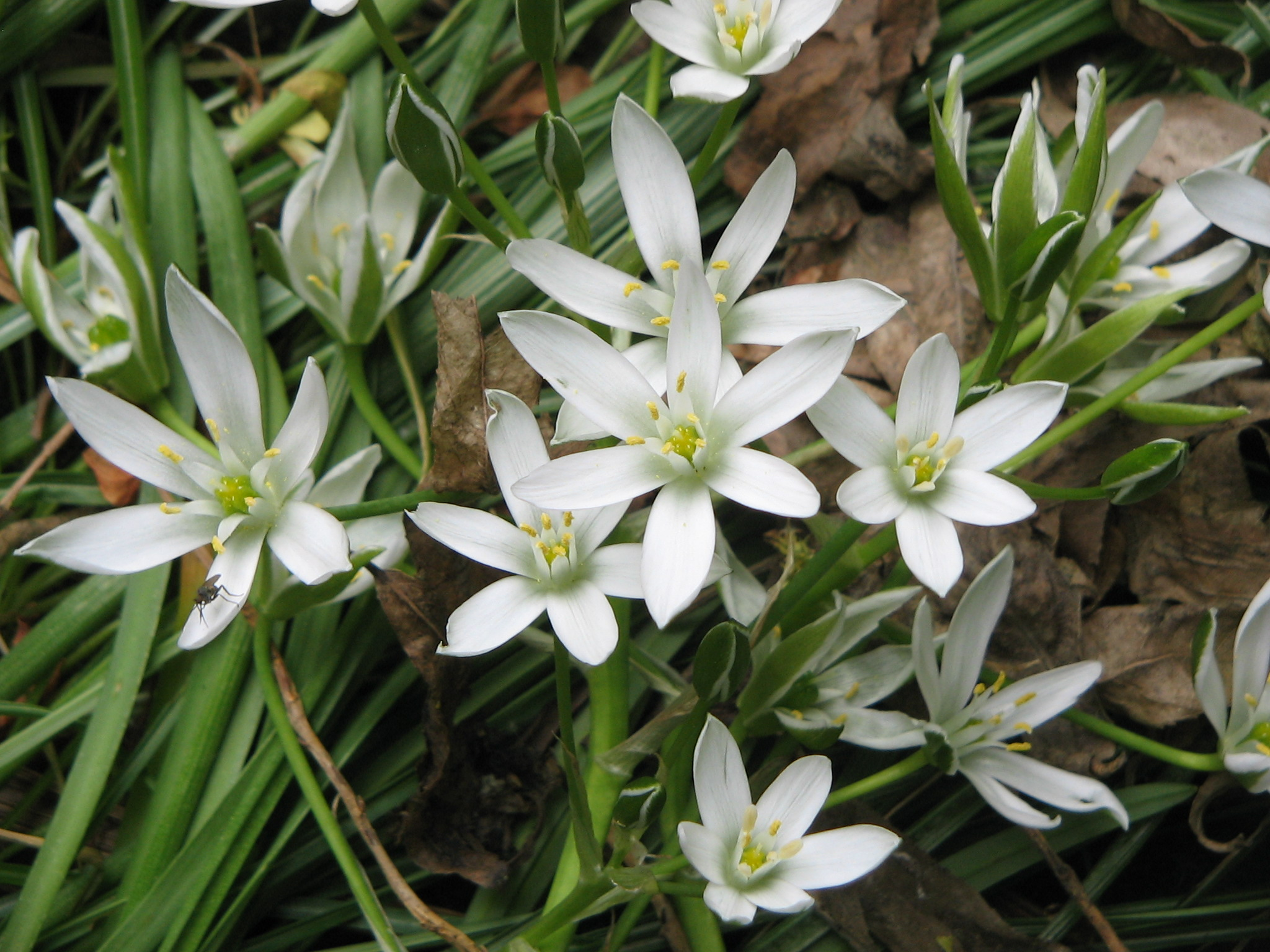

Scientific classification
- Kingdom: Plantae
- Clade: Tracheophytes
- Clade: Angiosperms
- Clade: Monocots
- Order: Asparagales
- Family: Asparagaceae
- Subfamily: Scilloideae
- Genus: Ornithogalum
- Species: O. umbellatum

Binomial name
- Ornithogalum umbellatum L.
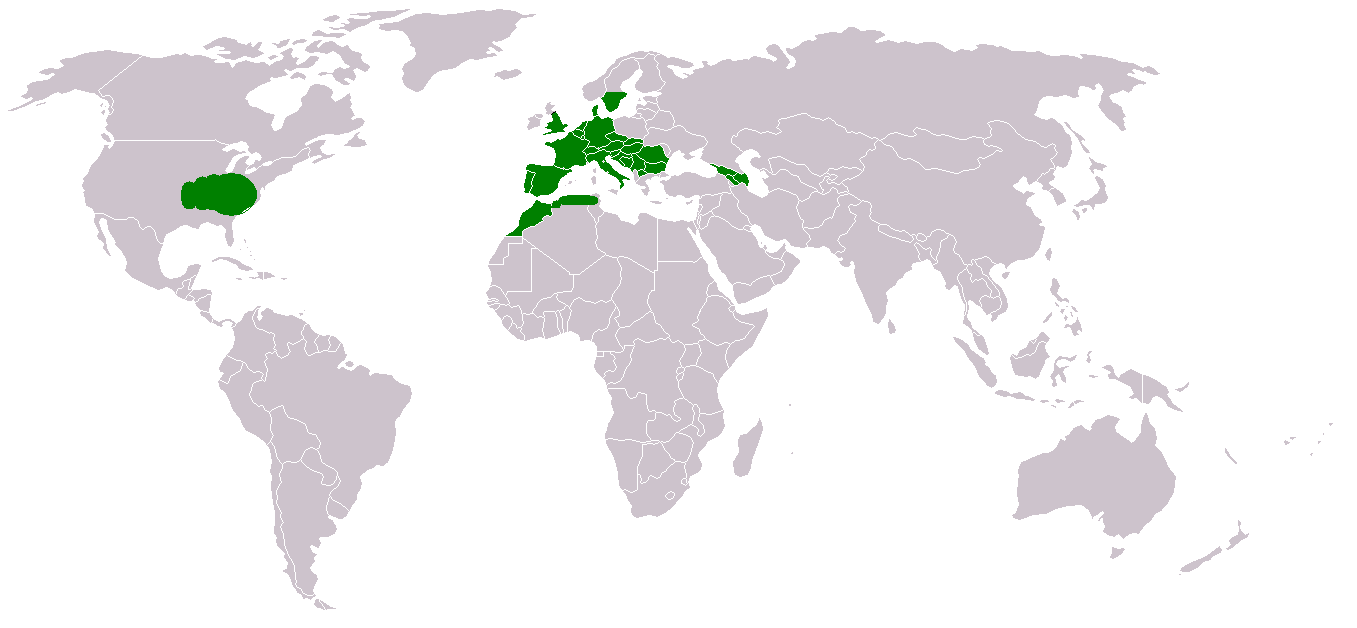
- Global distribution (native + introduced) of Ornithogalum umbellatum

Synonyms
- List: Hyacinthus umbellatus (L.) E. H. L.Krause; Ornithogalum affine Boreau nom. illeg.; Ornithogalum angustifolium Boreau; Ornithogalum boraeanum Jord. & Fourr.; Ornithogalum campestre (Savi) Prain; Ornithogalum cespititium Jord. & Fourr.; Ornithogalum corymbosum Gaterau; Ornithogalum dioscoridis Bubani; Ornithogalum fasciculatum Timb.-Lagr.; Ornithogalum garganicum Ten.; Ornithogalum horologicum Stokes; Ornithogalum minus L.; Ornithogalum nanum Ten. nom. illeg.; Ornithogalum parviflorum Jord. & Fourr.; Ornithogalum peyrei Timb.-Lagr.; Ornithogalum praetextum Steven ex Kunth; Ornithogalum preumbellatum Candargy; Ornithogalum rusticum Jord. & Fourr.; Ornithogalum stellare Salisb. nom. illeg.; Ornithogalum tardans Jord. & Fourr.; Ornithogalum vulgare Sailer; Scilla campestris Savi; Stellaris corymbosa (Gaterau) Moench

= Ornithogalum umbellatum =

Species of flowering plant

✶ P3+3 A3+3 G(3)
Floral formula: Flowers actinomorphic and hermaphrodite with 6 undifferentiated tepals in two whorls of three, the same number and arrangement of stamens, and a superior ovary with 3 fused carpels

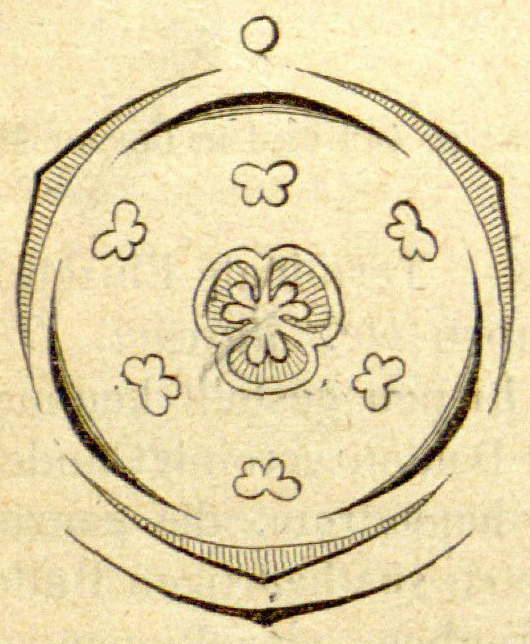
Floral diagram From centre outwards: Trilocular ovary, 6 stamens, 6 tepals

Ornithogalum umbellatum, the garden star-of-Bethlehem, grass lily, nap-at-noon, or eleven-o'clock lady, is a perennial bulbous flowering plant in the asparagus family (Asparagaceae). O. umbellatum is a relatively short plant, occurring in tufts of basal linear leaves, producing conspicuous white flowers, in a stellate pattern, in mid to late spring. The flowers open late in the day (hence some of its common names), but when closed have a green stripe on the outside. It is native throughout southern and central Europe, and north-western Africa. O. umbellatum is often grown as a garden ornamental, but in North America and other areas it has escaped cultivation and can be found in many areas, where it may be considered an invasive weed. Parts of the plant are considered poisonous, but are used in some regional cuisines. Essences are also sold as patent remedies. O. umbellatum has been depicted in art by artists such as Leonardo da Vinci, and folklore has suggested it originally grew from fragments of the star of Bethlehem, hence its horticultural name.

== Description ==
O. umbellatum is a perennial herbaceous bulbous plant (geophyte), dying back after flowering, to an underground storage bulb. The following year, it regrows from the often shallow rooted bulbs, which are ovoid with a membranous coat, 15–25 millimetres (1/2–1 inch) long and 18–32 mm (3/4–1 1/4 in) in diameter. The bulbs form multiple leaf-bearing bulbils that soon separate but remain close by. Initially the plant forms 6–10 basal leaves, that arise in tufts from the bulbs. The leaves are grooved (canaliculate), smooth (glabrous) and linear with a white to light green linear midrib on the upper surface, and grow up to 30 centimetres (12 in) long and 8 mm (1/4 in) broad.

O. umbellatum is scapose, with a glabrous flower stem (scape) that emerges from the leaf tufts later and is about 10–30 cm (4–12 in) in height, tapering at its tip.

Plant Morphology

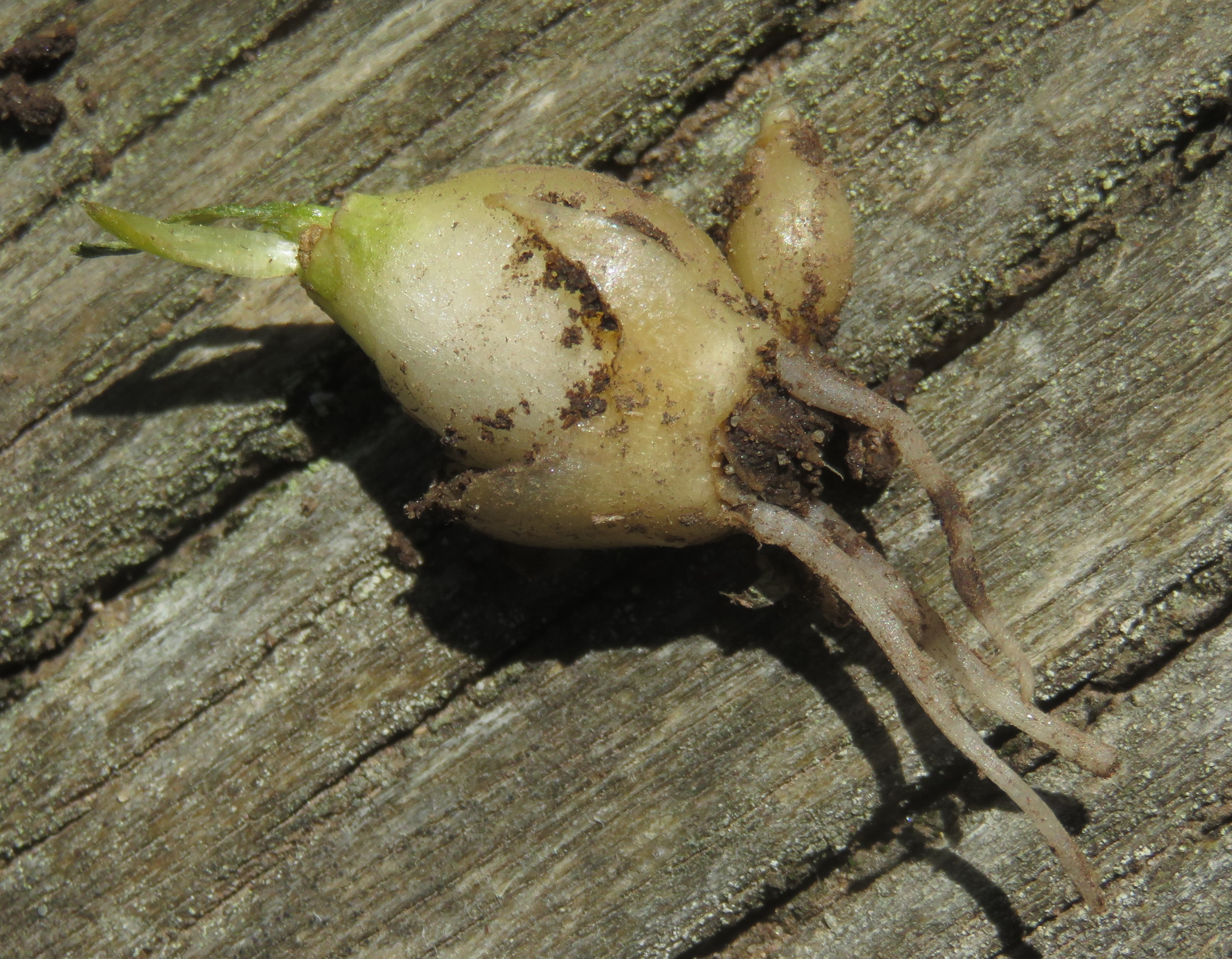
Bulb with bulbil

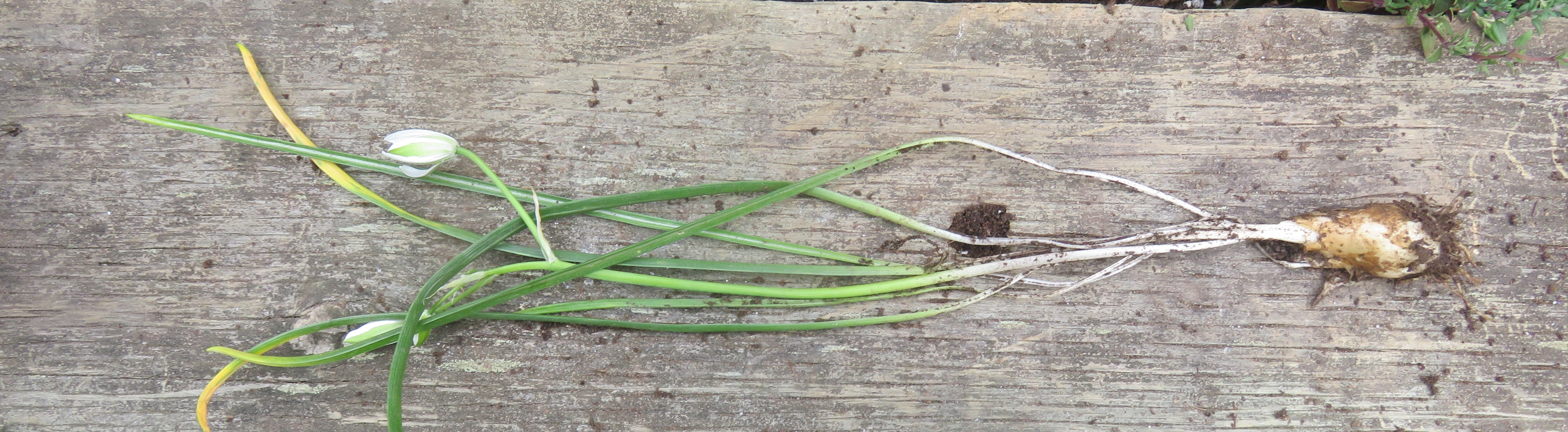
Ornithogalum plant

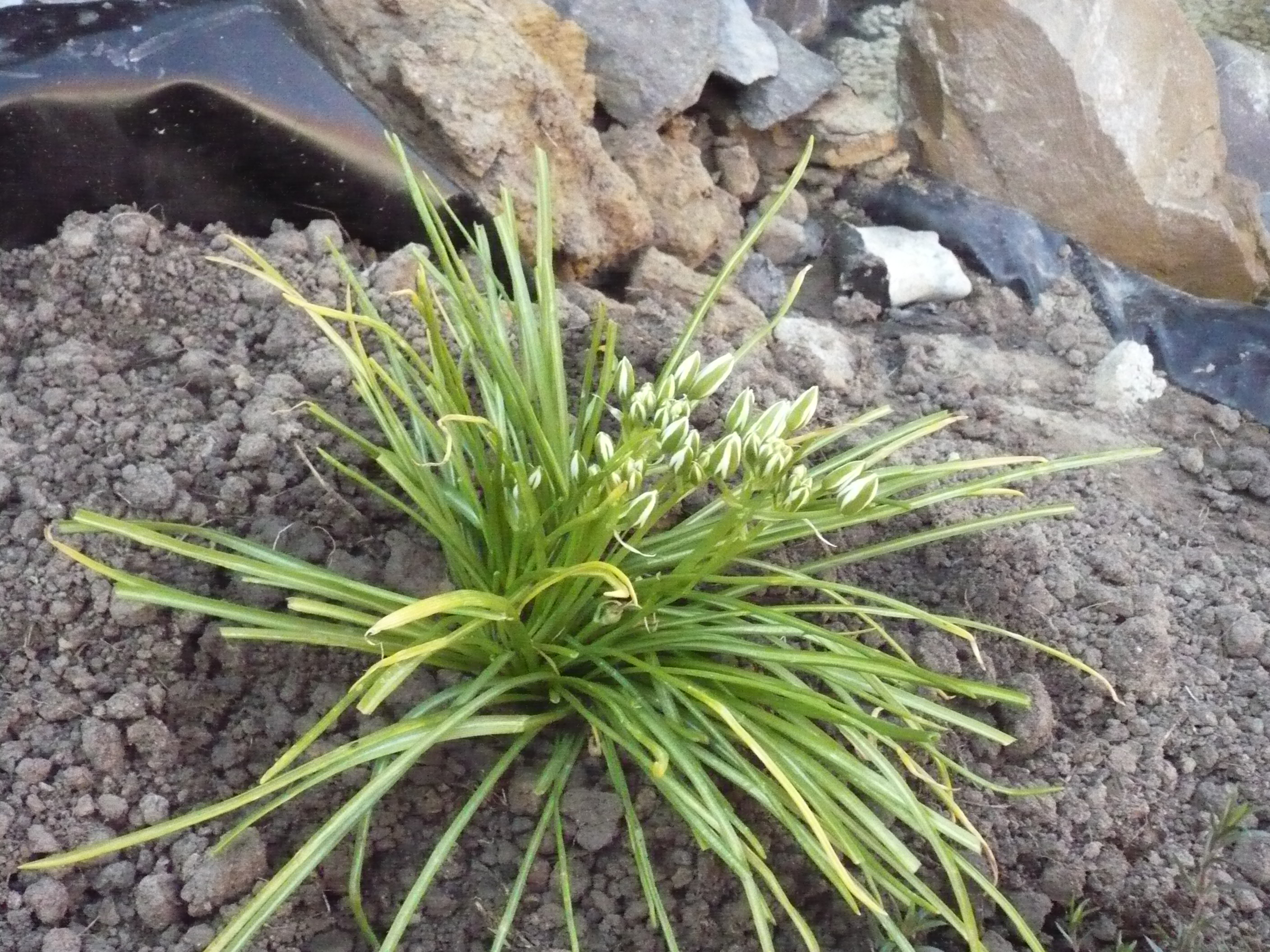
Clump of scapes with closed flowers arising from basal leaves

The inflorescence bears 6–20 flat star shaped flowers on ascending stems (pedicels), 3–3.5 cm (1 1/4–1 1/2 in), associated with membranaceous leaflets (bracts), 2.5–3 cm (1–1 1/4 in), in an open branching umbrella (umbel) shaped terminal cluster, described as a corymbose raceme. The petal-like perianth is radially symmetric (actinomorphic), which is 1.5–2 cm (1/2–3/4 in) in diameter, consists of six lanceolate tepals which are white with a green stripe on the underside (outside), 15 mm (1/2 in) in length and 5 mm (1/4 in) wide. From the outside the closed flower appears green with white margins.

The reproductive parts consist of both male (androecium) and female (gynoecium) parts (hermaphrodite). The androecium has six yellow-brown stamens that are free of the perianth and form two groups, each of about 5–8 mm (1/4–3/8 in), with filaments that are simple and flattened and oblong anthers that are 2–4 mm (1/16–3/16 in). The gynoecium has a single pistil with a superior (i. e. above the floral parts) ovary that is ovoid to obovoid, 3–4 mm (1/8–3/16 in), and longer than the style that extends above it. The fruit is a capsule which is oblong-ovoid with 3 sides and 6 ribs. Within it, each locule contains many seeds with a black coat of phytomelan. The species is polyploid (having more than two sets of chromosomes).

Floral morphology

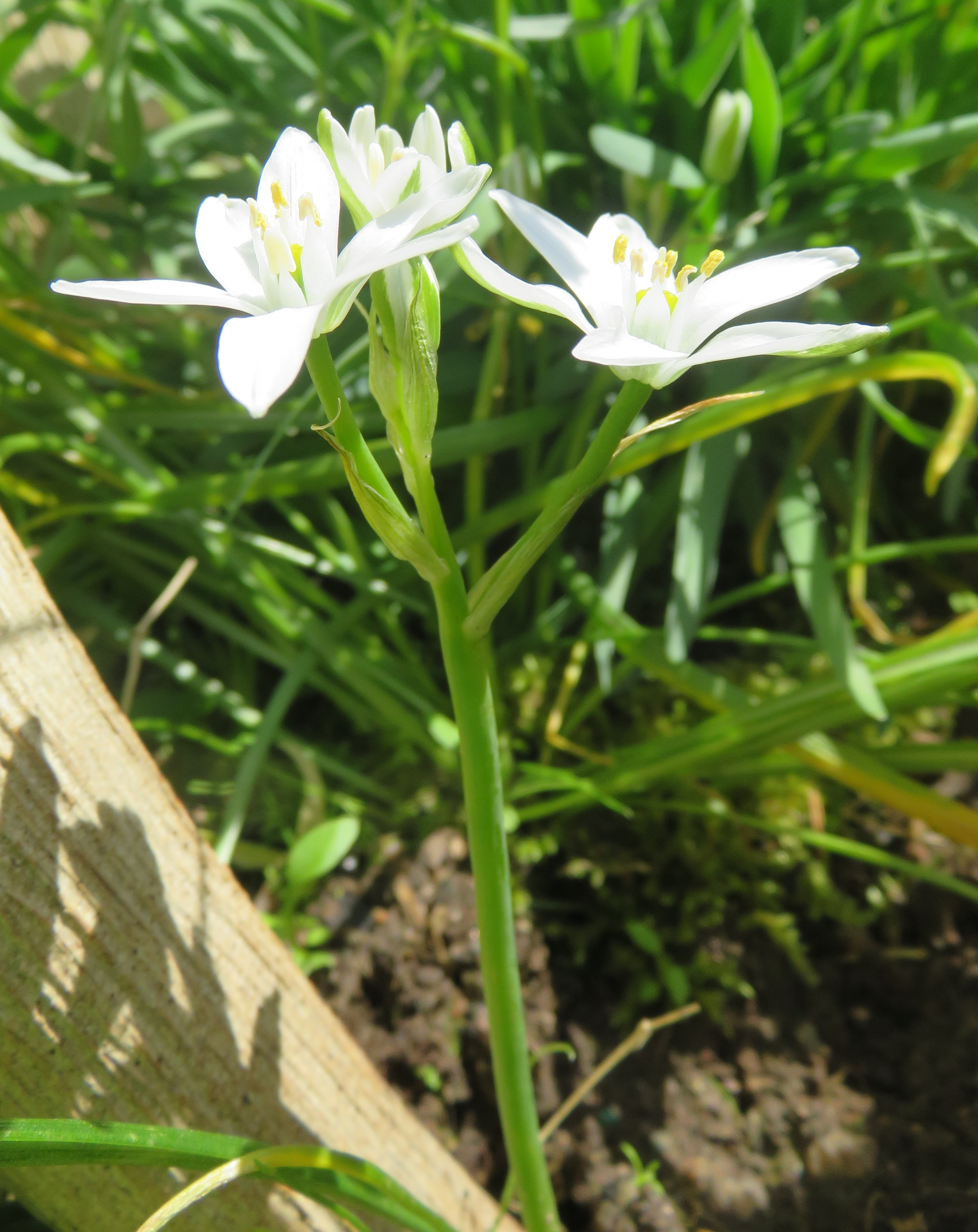
Inflorescence, pedicels and bracts

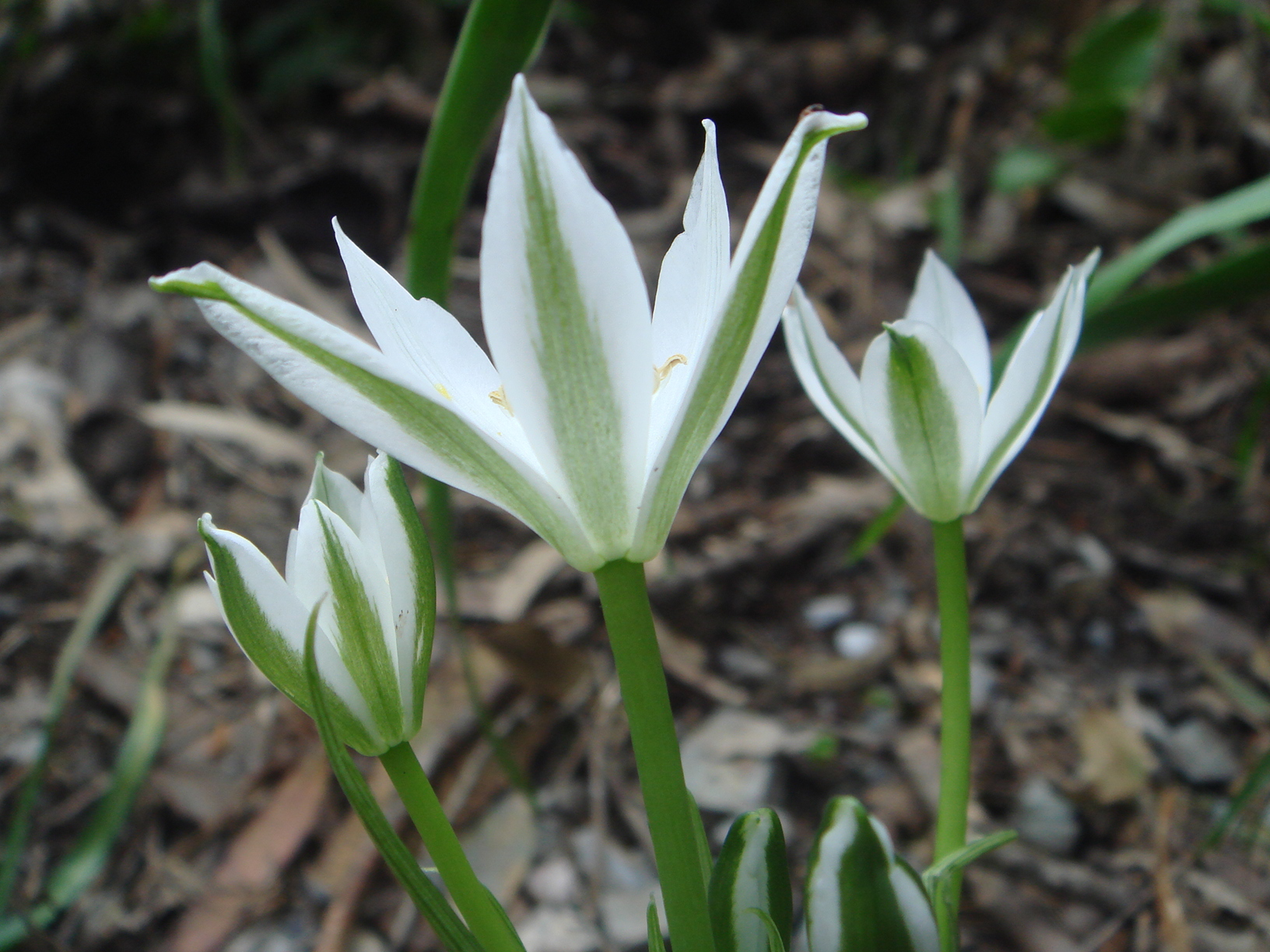
Underside of tepals

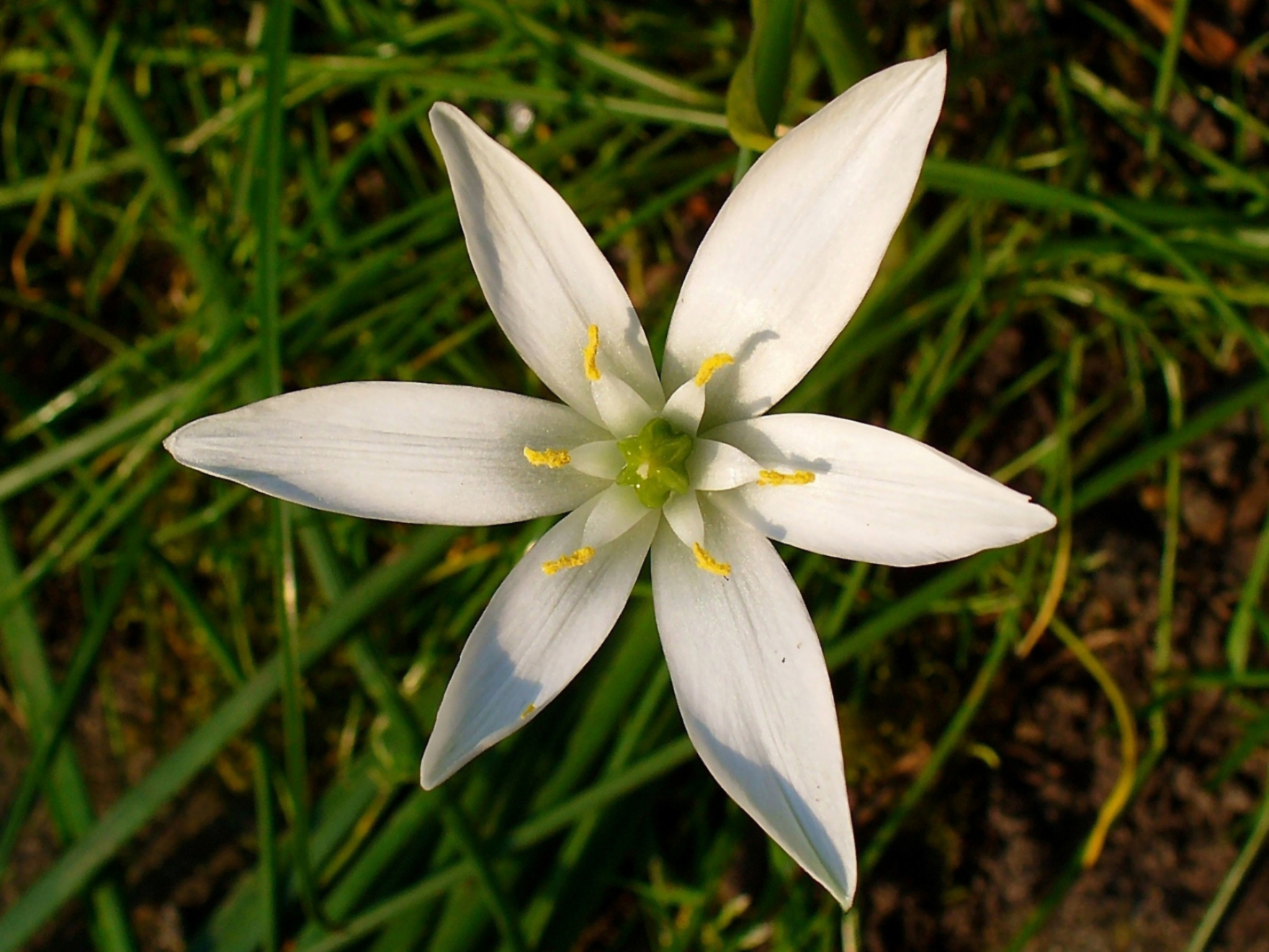
Detail of flower from above

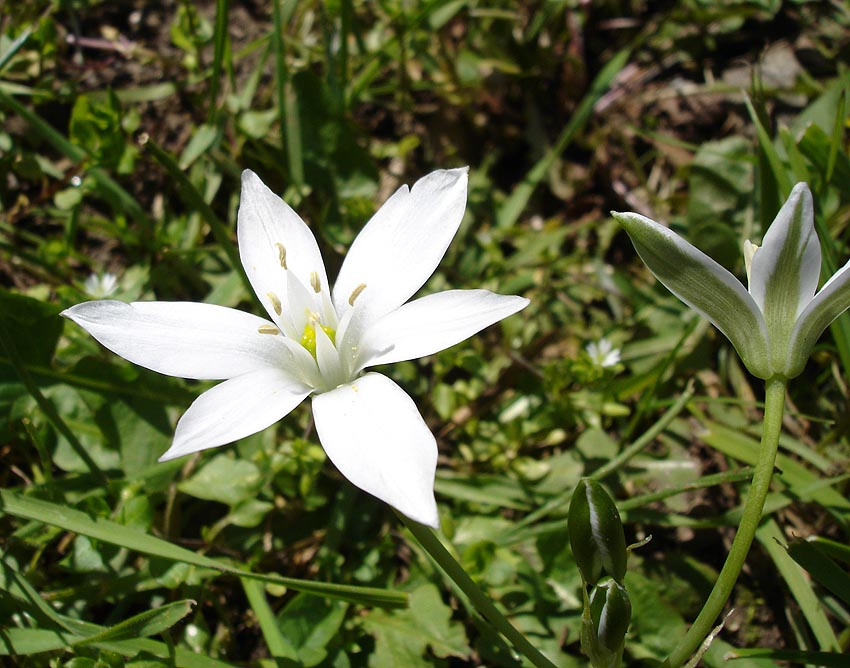
Flower from side

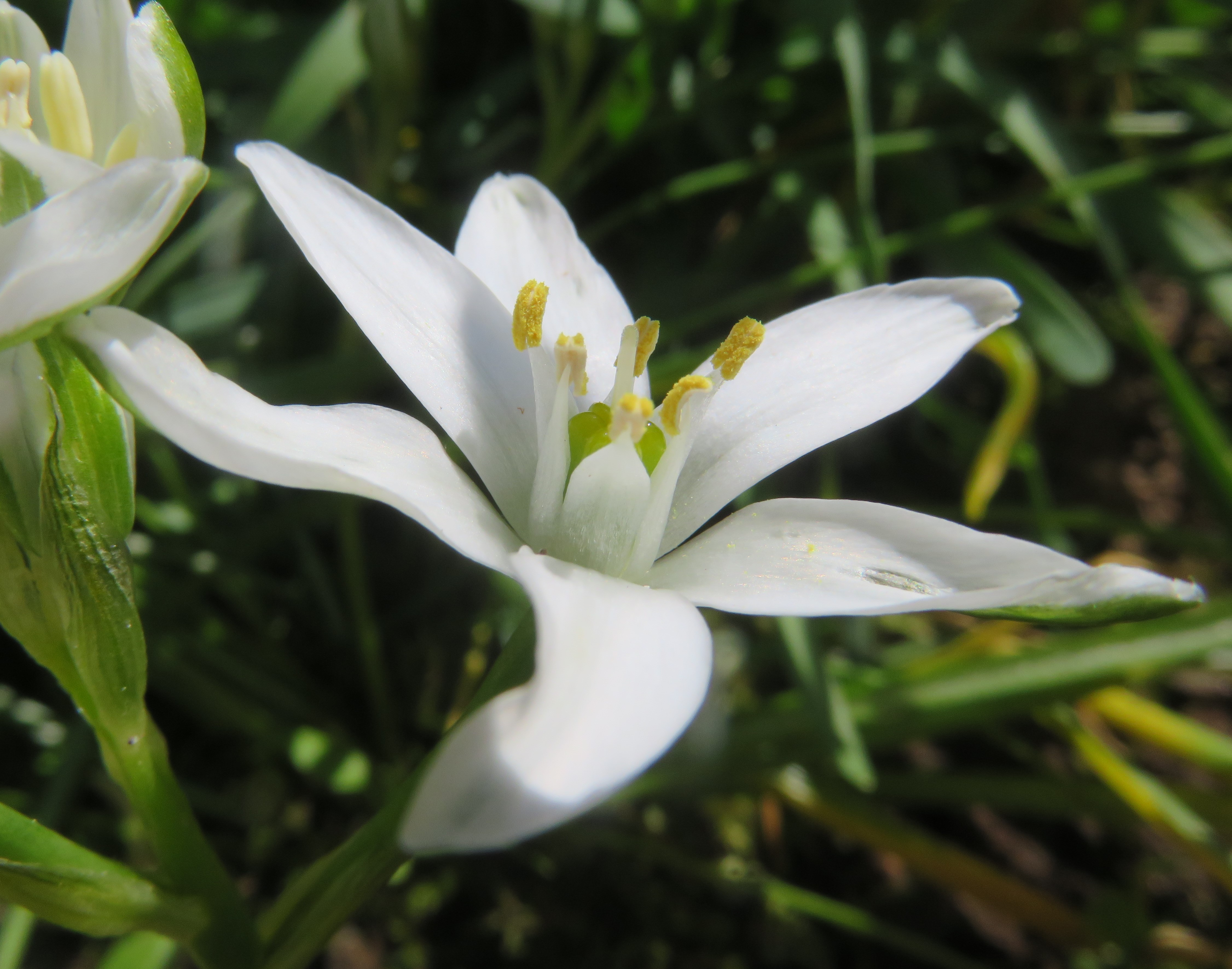
Detail of structures

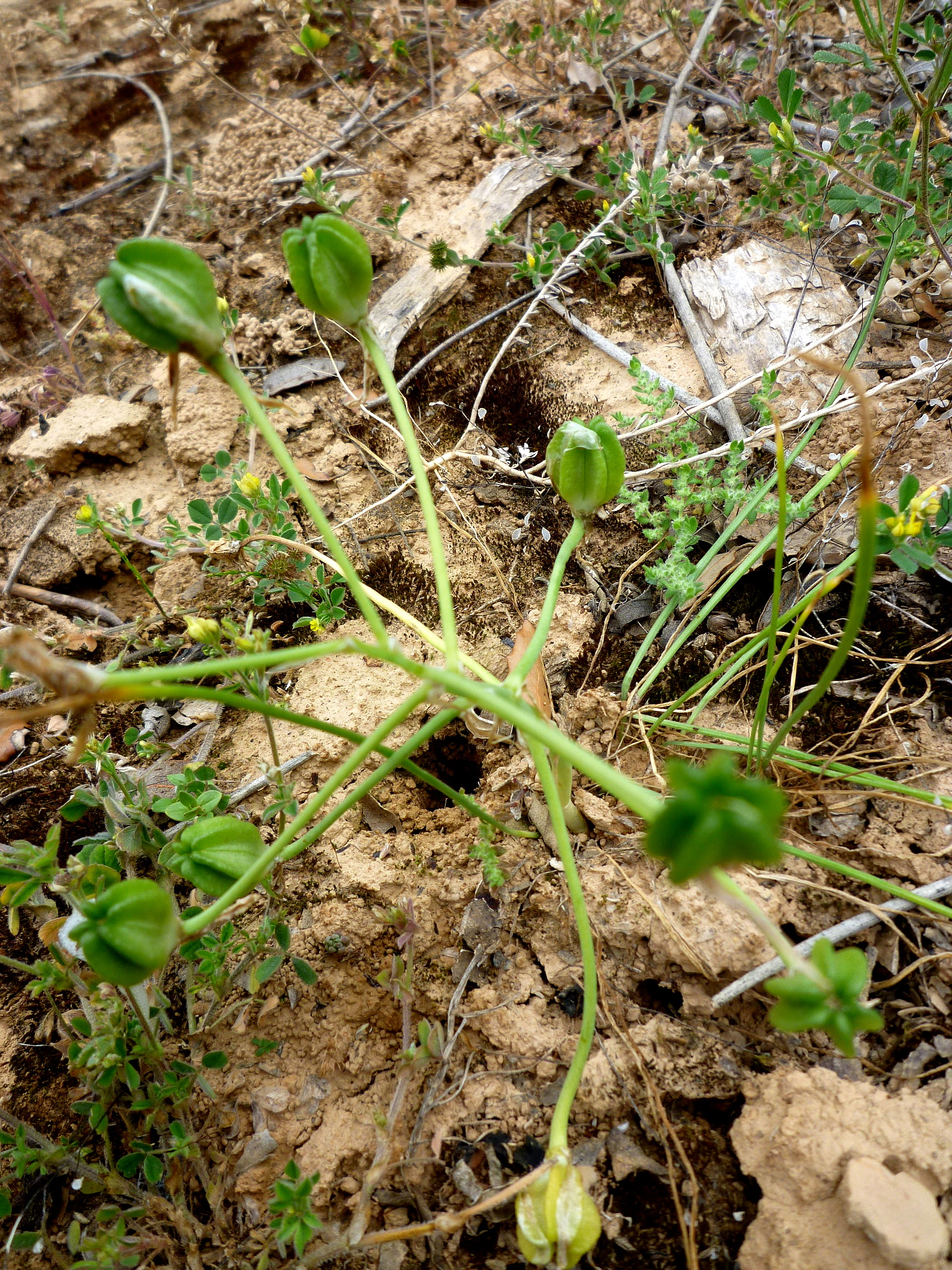
Capsules on scapes

== Taxonomy ==
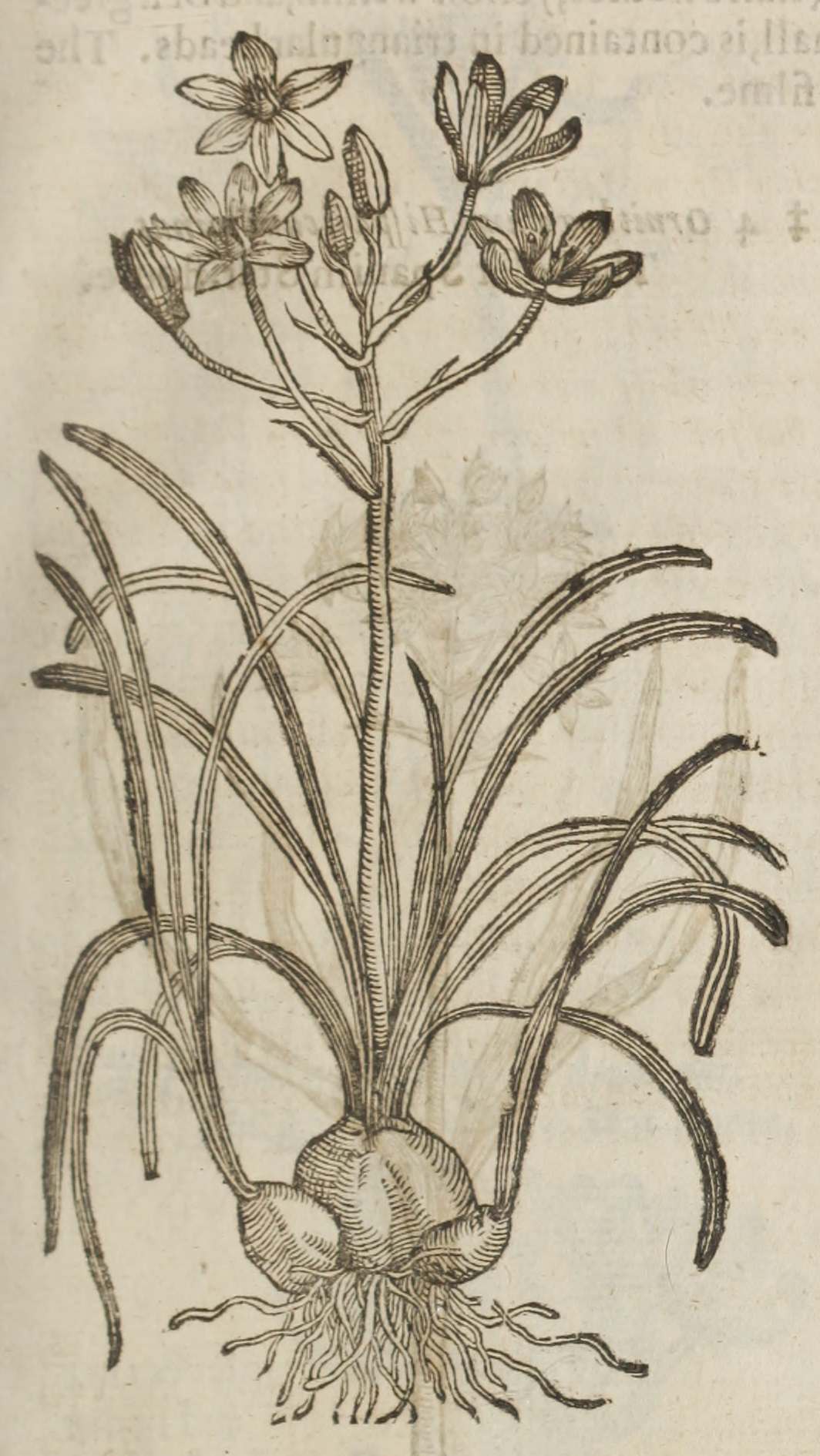
Illustration by John Gerard
1597

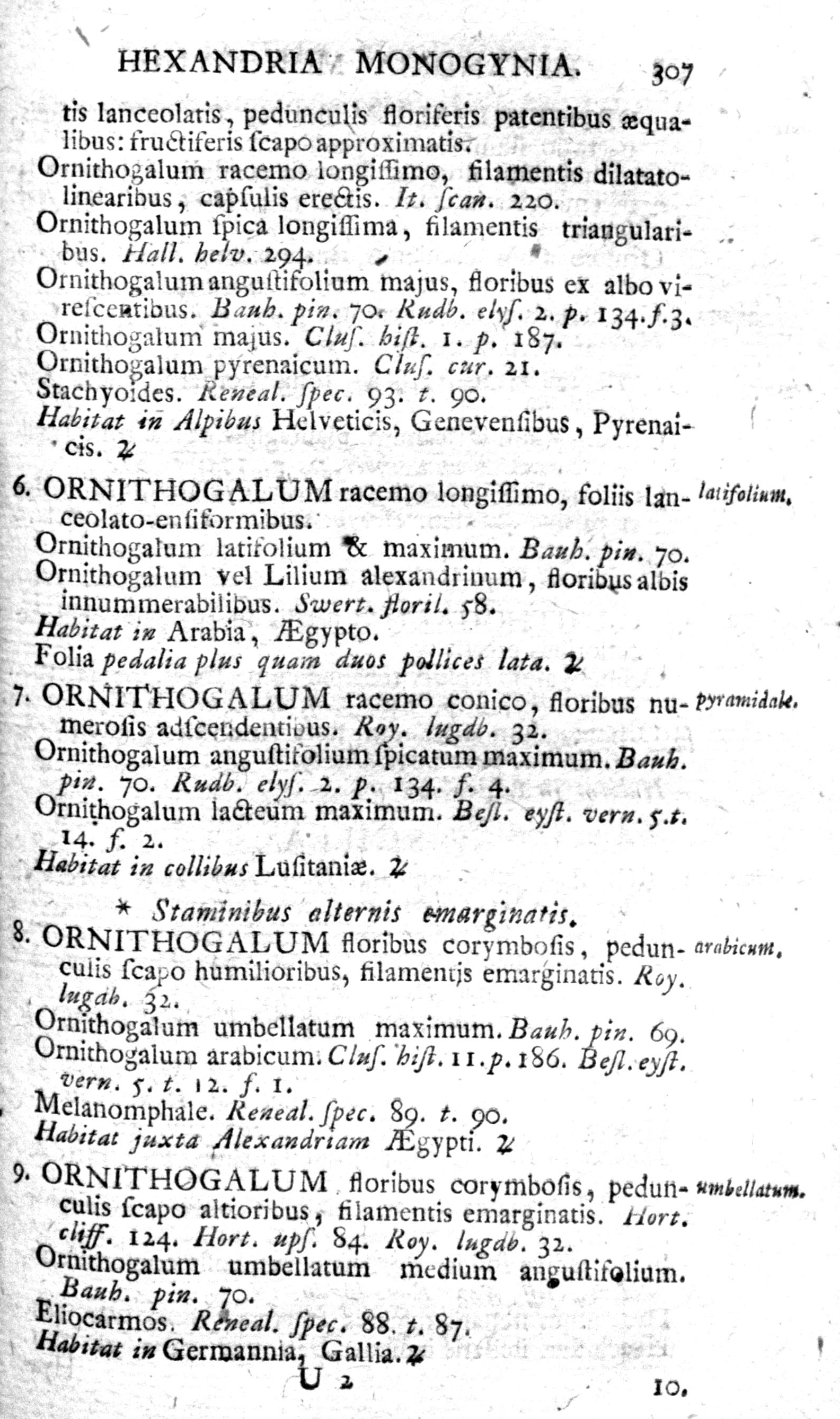
Description by Linnaeus
1753

Ornithogalum umbellatum has been known and described for a long time, according to some authors, as far back as Dioscorides in the first century. In 16th-century England, William Turner (1562) mentions it. In Henry Lyte's 1586 New Herbal (a translation into English of Dodoens' 1554 Cruydeboeck), reference is made to an Ornithogalum as the White Field Onion. John Gerard, in his Herball of 1597, describes Ornithogalum as the "star of Bethlem". The species known today as Ornithogalum umbellatum was first formally described by Linnaeus (1753), who is the botanical authority for the species (L.). O. umbellatum is the type species of the genus Ornithogalum, which contains about 50 species. The lectotype (reference specimen) was established by Stearn in 1983.

=== Etymology ===
The species epithet reflects the flower formation as an umbel. The plant's many common names include garden star-of-Bethlehem, sleepydick, nap-at-noon, grass lily, summer snowflake, snowdrop, starflower, bird's milk, chinkerichee, ten-o'clock lady, eleven-o'clock lady, Bath asparagus, and star of Hungary. The references to the time of day reflect the opening times of the flowers, opening late and closing at night or in cloudy conditions. The star names indicate the arrangement of the petals and bird's milk is a literal translation of ornithogalum. It has also been called dove's dung, equating it with a plant described in the bible. The name star-of-Bethlehem is shared by a number of species of Ornithogalum, due to the white stellate flowers, and the folklore relating the flower to the biblical star-of-Bethlehem (see In popular culture).

== Distribution and habitat ==
A native of most of Europe, North Africa and western Asia, O. umbellatum has been adopted as an ornamental garden plant from where it has escaped and naturalised widely in North America, where it is considered an aggressive noxious weed of lawns, gardens and no-till agricultural land, which can be difficult to eradicate. In Europe its range extends from Ireland and Portugal in the west, Italy in the south, north to parts of France and east to Turkey and the Levant.

O. umbellatum prefers damp habitats, being found along rivers, streams, and lower, wet areas of pastures. It is tolerant to shade and soil type.

== Ecology ==
=== Life cycle ===
Ornithogalum umbellatum is thermoperiodic, requiring a cold winter to complete its life cycle. It first appears in early spring as tufts of leaves, prior to flowering (proteranthous), which occurs in late spring (May–June), the leaves fading prior to blooming. It reproduces by its bulbs, which form many offsetting bulbils that can be dispersed by water. Like many bulb plants from temperate regions, a period of exposure to cold is necessary before spring growth can begin. This protects the plant from growth during winter when intense cold may damage it. Warmer spring temperatures then initiate growth from the bulb. O. umbellatum spreads aggressively in clumps by means of these offsets.

=== Pollination ===
The flowers are insect pollinated, but may also be self-fertile, forming seeds in summer (June–July). Seed dispersal plays a relatively minor role in propagation, but accounts for isolated blooms.

=== Effect of light ===
The petals exhibit photoperiodism, often opening at noon and closing at night or on cloudy days.

Effect of light

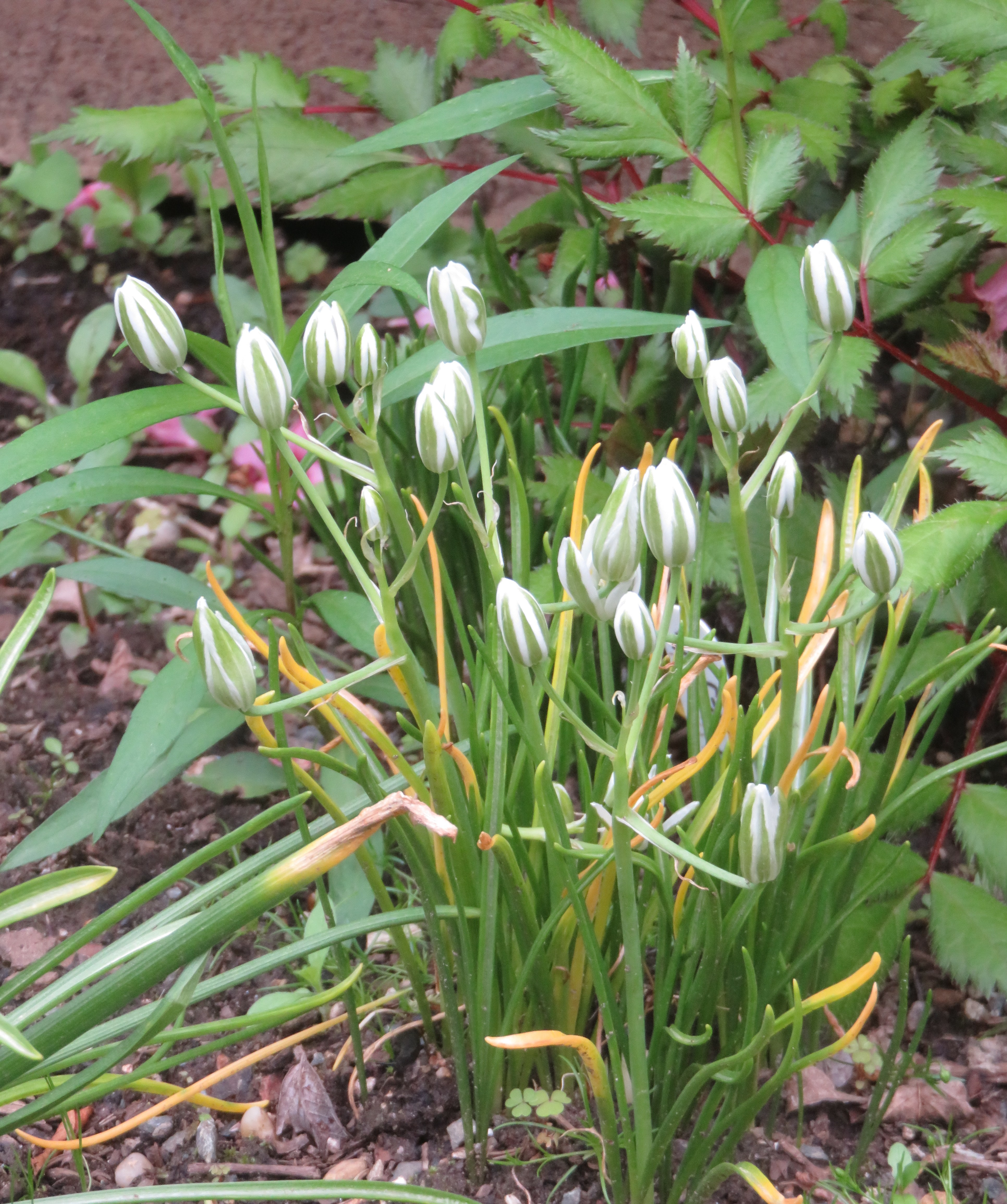
Cloudy day

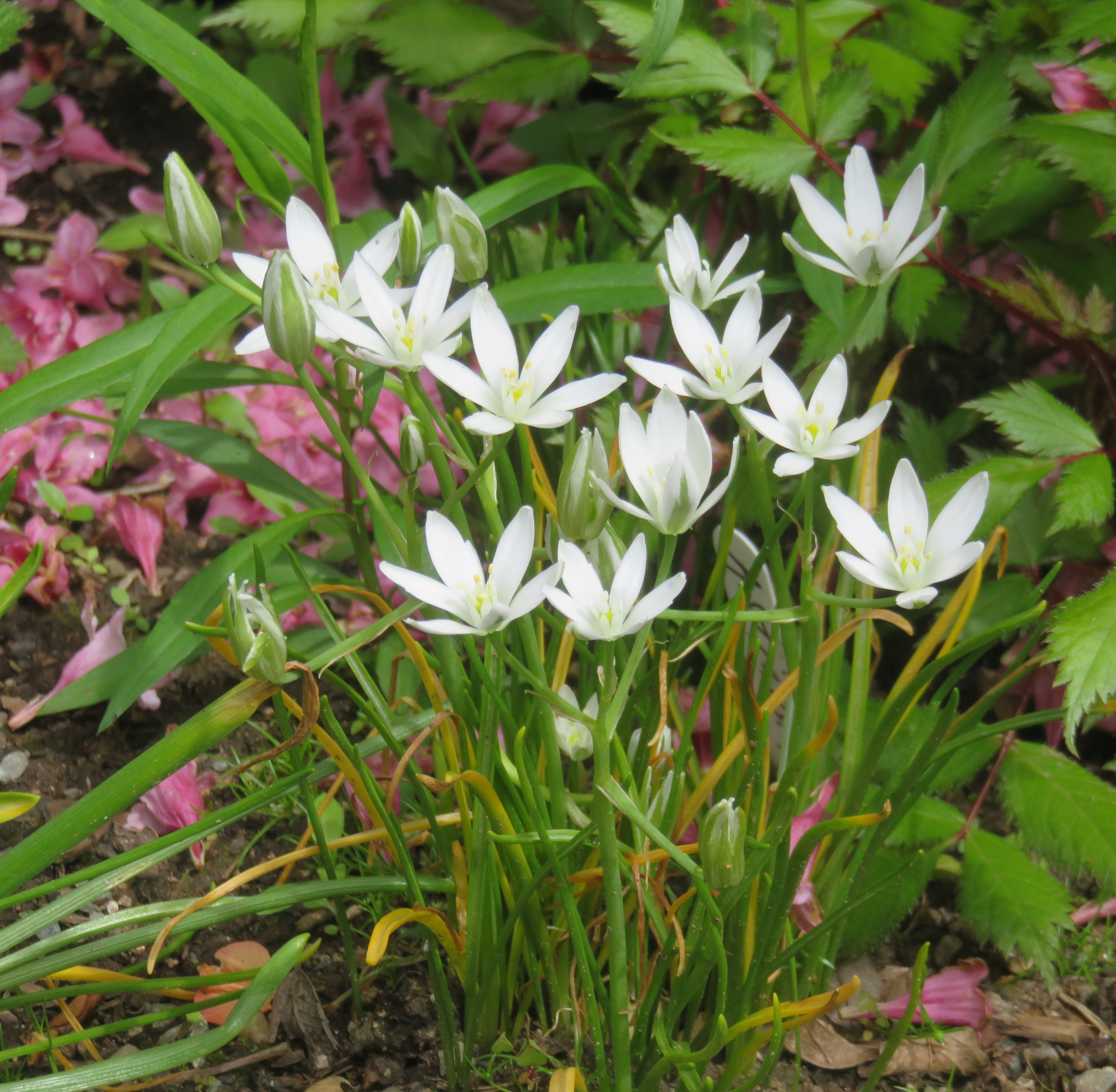
Sunny day

== Cultivation ==
Ornithogalum umbellatum requires considerable moisture during winter and spring, but can tolerate summer drought. It can be grown in a woodland garden as semi-shade is preferable. It is hardy to zone 5 UK, 4–9 USDA, and can become invasive. It is produced commercially as an ornamental garden plant. To control invasive tendencies, it is best to plant in a container or an edged area. O. umbellatum may be grown as an indoor plant.

== Toxicity ==
The plant, especially the bulb and flowers, contains cardiac glycosides, specifically convallatoxin and convalloside which are toxic to humans and livestock. Symptoms of poisoning include nausea, salivation, vomiting, diarrhea, and shortness of breath, as well as pain, burning, and swelling of lips, tongue, and throat. Prolonged contact may lead to skin irritation.

== Uses ==
Despite the known toxicities, the plant has been described as edible for 2,000 years and incorporated into some traditional regional cuisines (e.g., Turkish) and traditional medicine (e.g., Indian). In Britain, the plant has long been the subject of herbals for its claimed culinary and medicinal properties. This includes drying and grinding the bulbs, or boiling them and baking the flowers into bread. Essences are sold as patent remedies and for aromatherapy, such as Bach flower remedies. Medical authorities advise against ingesting any part of the plant.

== In culture ==
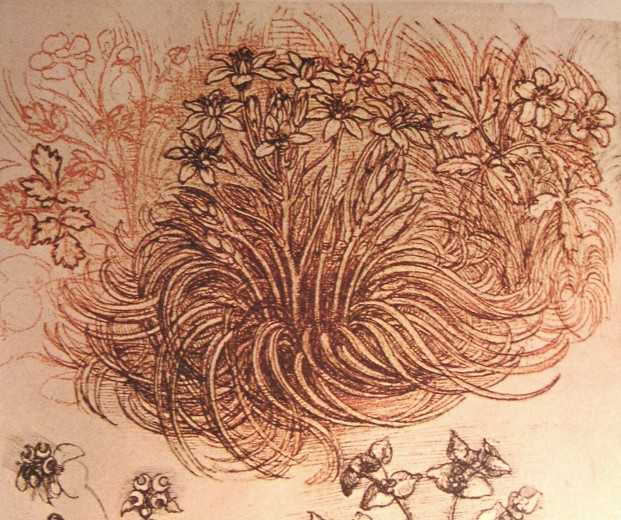
Leonardo da Vinci drawing of flowers

Leonardo da Vinci drew O. umbellatum and included the plant in one of his depictions of Leda and the Swan (1508–1515), in which the flowers are held in Leda's left hand. In folklore, the biblical star of Bethlehem is said to have fallen to the earth and shattered into pieces which became the ubiquitous white flowers. Legend has also associated it with the journeys of Crusaders and pilgrims to the Holy Land.

A biblical passage in 2 Kings 6:25 relates an account of a siege in Samaria in which the desperate population consumed the excrement of doves (chiriyonim). "There was a great famine in Samaria; and behold, they besieged it, until a donkey's head was sold for eighty shekels of silver, and a fourth of a kab of dove's dung for five shekels of silver". There has been considerable discussion as to the exact meaning of this term. In notes taken by Paul Dietrich Giseke from a lecture by Linnaeus it is suggested that this Stercus Columbarum was in fact the plant Ornithogalum umbellatum, which grew abundantly in Palestine and "unde Anglis Bethlem's Star dicitur" (is known to the English as Bethlem's Star), the white colour of which resembled the excrement of birds, hence the name lac Avium (bird milk or Ornithogalum), and which was still eaten by the poor of that country.

Culturally, the flower has been associated with purity and hope, atonement and reconciliation.

== Bibliography ==
=== Books ===
- Blamey, Marjorie; Grey-Wilson, C. (1989). The Illustrated Flora of Britain and Northern Europe. Hodder & Stoughton. ISBN 978-0-340-40170-5.
- Capra, Fritjof (2013). Learning from Leonardo: Decoding the Notebooks of a Genius. Berrett-Koehler Publishers. ISBN 978-1-60994-990-7.
- Cullen, James; Knees, Sabina G.; Cubey, H. Suzanne Cubey, eds. (2011) [1984–2000]. "O. umbellatum". The European Garden Flora, Flowering Plants: A Manual for the Identification of Plants Cultivated in Europe, Both Out-of-Doors and Under Glass. 5 vols (2nd ed.). Cambridge: Cambridge University Press.
- Huxley, Anthony Julian; Griffiths, Mark; Levy, Margot (1992). The New Royal Horticultural Society Dictionary of Gardening. Macmillan Press. ISBN 978-0-333-47494-5.
- Moldenke, Harold N; Moldenke, Alma N (2017) [1941]. Plants Of The Bible. CRC Press. ISBN 978-1-317-84742-7.
- Tutin, T. G.; Heywood, V H; Burges, N. A.; Moore, D. M.; Valentine, D. H.; Walters, S. M.; Webb, D. A., eds. (1980). "O. umbellatum l.". Flora Europaea. Volume 5, Alismataceae to Orchidaceae (monocotyledones). Cambridge, England: Cambridge University Press. ISBN 0-521-20108-X. see also Flora Europaea

Historical sources

- Balfour, John Hutton (1885). "Dove's Dung". The Plants of the Bible. T. Nelson and sons. pp. 237–238.
- Cotes, Rosemary A (1898). "The Star of Bethlehem". Dante's Garden, with Legends of the Flowers. London: Methuen. pp. 107–110.
- Dioscorides, Pedanius (2000) [ca. 70]. Osbaldeston, Tess Anne (ed.). De Materia Medica: Being an herbal with many other medicinal matters. Written in Greek in the first century of the common era. Johannesburg: Ibidis. ISBN 0-620-23435-0.
- Gerard, John (1636) [1597]. "Of Star of Bethlehem". In Johnson, Thomas (ed.). The Herball, or Generall Historie of Plantes, gathered by John Gerarde, Master in Chirurgerie. Very much enlarged and amended by Thomas Johnson, Citizen and Apothecarye (3rd ed.). London: Adam Islip, Joice Norton and Richard Whitakers. pp. 165–168.
- Grieve, Maud (1971) [1931]. "Star of Bethlehem". A Modern Herbal. Dover Publications. pp. 769–770. ISBN 978-0-486-22799-3.
- Linnaeus, Carl (1753). Species Plantarum: exhibentes plantas rite cognitas, ad genera relatas, cum differentiis specificis, nominibus trivialibus, synonymis selectis, locis natalibus, secundum systema sexuale digestas (in Latin). Stockholm: Impensis Laurentii Salvii. p. 307.
- Linnaeus, Carl (1792). Giseke, Paul Dietrich (ed.). Praelectiones in ordines naturales plantarum. Hamburg: Benj. Gottl. Hoffmanni.
- Loudon, Jane (1849). "Ornithogalum". The Ladies' Flower-garden of Ornamental Bulbous Plants. W.S. Orr & Company. pp. 192–193.(full text at BHL)
- Lyte, Henry (1586). "Of the White Field Onion". A new herball, or, Historie of plants: wherein is contained the whole discourse and perfect description of all sorts of herbes and plants: their diuers and sundrie kindes: their names, natures, operations, & vertues: and that not onely of those which are heere growing in this our countrie of England, but of all others also of forraine realms commonly used in physicke, First set foorth in the Douch or Almaigne toong. London: Ninian Newton. pp. 744–745.
- Smith, William (1877) [1863]. Dr. William Smith's Dictionary of the Bible: Comprising Its Antiquities, Biography, Geography and Natural History (Revised ed.). New York: Hurd and Houghton., see Smith's Bible Dictionary
- Turner, William (1995) [1562, 1568]. Chapman, George T. L.; et al. (eds.). A New Herball. Cambridge University Press. ISBN 978-0-521-44549-8.

=== Articles ===
- Gadella, Th. W. J. (June 1972). "Some Notes On Ornithogalum Umbellatum L. And Ornithogalum Divergens Bor". Acta Botanica Neerlandica. 21 (3): 257–260. doi:10.1111/j.1438-8677.1972.tb00778.x.
- V, Krishna; Semotiuk, Andrew J.; J, Krishna Chaitanya M.; U, Santhosh Kumar J. (11 February 2019). "Indigenous knowledge on medicinal plants used by ethnic communities of South India". Ethnobotany Research and Applications. 18: 1–112. doi:10.32859/era.18.4.1-112. ISSN 1547-3465.
- Martinez-Azorin, Mario; Crespo, Manuel B.; Juan, Ana; Fay, Michael F. (2011). "Molecular phylogenetics of subfamily Ornithogaloideae (Hyacinthaceae) based on nuclear and plastid DNA regions, including a new taxonomic arrangement". Annals of Botany. 107 (1): 1–37. doi:10.1093/aob/mcq207. PMC 3002468. PMID 21163815.
- Ozbek, Kursad; Karabak, Sevinc; Aysar Guzelsoy, Nurcan; et al. (2017). "Biodiversity for Food and Nutrition Project: Black Sea Region Studies". Anadolu. 27 (2): 1725.
- Stearn, WT (1983). "The Linnaean species of Ornithogalum (Liliaceae)". Annales Musei Goulandris. 6: 139–170.
- Steckel, Lawrence E.; McClure, M. Angela (October–December 2015). "Oh, Beautiful Star-of-Bethlehem (Ornithogalum umbellatum)". Weed Technology. 29 (4): 874–877. doi:10.1614/WT-D-15-00065.1. S2CID 85584737.

=== Databases ===
- USDA. "Ornithogalum umbellatum (star of Bethlehem)". Plants database.
- TPL (2013). "The Plant List Version 1.1". Royal Botanic Gardens, Kew and Missouri Botanical Garden.
- "Ornithogalum umbellatum L., Sp. Pl.: 307 (1753)". World Checklist of Selected Plant Families. Royal Botanic Gardens, Kew.
- "Ornithogalum umbellatum L.". Euro+Med Plantbase. Berlin-Dahlem Botanical Garden and Botanical Museum. 2006.
- "Ornithogalum umbellatum L." Plants of the World Online. Royal Botanic Gardens, Kew.

=== Other websites ===
- "Star of Bethlehem". Invasive Plant Atlas of New England (IPANE). The University of Georgia – Center for Invasive Species and Ecosystem Health. 2019.
- BSBI. "Ornithogalum umbellatum L. "Garden Star-of-Bethlehem"". Botanical Society of Britain & Ireland.
- FNA (2003). "Ornithogalum umbellatum Linnaeus, Sp. Pl. 1: 307. 1753". Flora of North America. New York: Oxford University Press.
- MBG. "Ornithogalum umbellatum". Plant Finder. Missouri Botanical Garden.
- Jordan, T (2000). "Star-of-Bethlehem, snowdrop, nap-at-noon, Ornithogalum umbellatum". Indiana Plants Poisonous to Livestock and Pets. Purdue University, College of Veterinary Medicine. Archived from the original on February 17, 2008.
- Devlin, Zoë (2019). "Star-of-Bethlehem". Wildflowers of Ireland.
- Muma, Walter. "Star-of-Bethlehem (Ornithogalum umbellatum)". Ontario Wildflowers.
- "Ornithogalum Species, Eleven-o'clock Lady, Nap at Noon, Snowdrop, Star of Bethlehem". Dave's Garden. 2019.
- Brown, Sharon (8 March 2011). "Star of Bethlehem: Toxic, Invasive, or Lovely?". Dave's Garden.
- "Ornithogalum umbellatum". Van Engelen. 2019.
- "Leonardo da Vinci – A star-of-Bethlehem and other plants c. 1506–12". Royal Collection Trust.
- "Star of Bethlehem". The Bach Centre. Archived from the original on 24 June 2019.
- "Ornithogalum umbellatum (Scientific name)". Canadian Poisonous Plants Information System. Agriculture and Agri-Food Canada. 2013.
- "star-of-Bethlehem: Ornithogalum umbellatum (Asparagales: Asparagaceae): Invasive Plant Atlas of the United States". The University of Georgia - Center for Invasive Species and Ecosystem Health. October 2018.
- Tsuyuzaki, Shiro (9 July 2018). "Ornithogalum umbellatum L." Plant ecology • Environmental Conservation. Graduate School of Environmental Science, Hokkaido University.
- "Star Of Bethlehem Flower – Pictures of Flowers". Flower Pictures. 23 July 2010.
- "The Transient Blossoms of Sleepydick or Pyrenees' Star of Bethlehem". Paghat's Garden. Archived from the original on February 23, 2005.
- WebMD (2019). "Star Of Bethlehem: Uses, Side Effects, Interactions, Dosage, and Warning". Vitamins & Supplements.
- "Ornithogalum umbellatum Star Of Bethlehem, Dove's Dung". Plant Database. Plants for a Future. 2012.
- Palomo, Eulalia (2018). "How to Grow Star of Bethlehem Plants Indoors". Homeguides: Gardening. San Francisco Chronicle.
- Badgett, Becca (1 December 2018). "Star Of Bethlehem Plant Care: Tips On Growing Star Of Bethlehem Bulbs". Bulbs. Gardening Know How.
