= Listed buildings in Seal, Kent =

Civil Parish in Kent, England

Seal is a village and civil parish in the Sevenoaks District of Kent, England. It contains one grade I, three grade II* and 89 grade II listed buildings that are recorded in the National Heritage List for England.

This list is based on the information retrieved online from Historic England.

== Key ==
Grade	Criteria
I	Buildings that are of exceptional interest
II*	Particularly important buildings of more than special interest
II	Buildings that are of special interest

== Listing ==
Name	Grade	Location	Type	Completed (Note: The date given is the date used by Historic England as significant for the initial building or that of an important part in the structure's description.)	Date designated	Grid ref. (Note: The grid reference is based on the British national grid reference system, sometimes known as OSGB36, used by the Ordnance Survey.) Geo-coordinates	Notes	Entry number (Note: The "List Entry Number" is a unique number assigned to each listed building and scheduled monument by Historic England.)	Image	Wikidata
Flats 1 and 4, Bretaneby, with Part of Flat 5	II	TN15 0AJ			16 January 1975	TQ5492156718; 51°17′19″N 0°13′13″E		1243504	Upload Photo	Q26536177
Bow Petts Cottages North	II	Back Lane, Godden Green			16 January 1975	TQ5518954324; 51°16′01″N 0°13′23″E		1243494	Upload Photo	Q26536168
Lord's Spring Cottage Lord's Spring Cottages	II	Bitchet Green			16 January 1975	TQ5687354582; 51°16′08″N 0°14′50″E		1243476	Upload Photo	Q26536150
Tea House in the Japanese Garden, Bitchet Green	II	Bitchet Green, TN15 0NB			21 December 2017	TQ5674954256; 51°15′57″N 0°14′43″E		1451633	Upload Photo	Q66479167
2 and 3, Church Road	II	2 and 3, Church Road			16 January 1975	TQ5493056792; 51°17′21″N 0°13′14″E		1243496	Upload Photo	Q26536170
Forge Cottage	II	Church Road			11 December 1989	TQ5494556771; 51°17′20″N 0°13′14″E		1244254	Upload Photo	Q26536883
The Five Bells Public House	II	Church Road			16 January 1975	TQ5496156801; 51°17′21″N 0°13′15″E		1272872	Upload Photo	Q26562675
Church of St Peter and St Paul	I	Church Street			10 September 1954	TQ5504756963; 51°17′27″N 0°13′20″E		1243497	Church of St Peter and St Paul More images	Q17529879
Front Forecourt Wall to the Grey House	II	Church Street			16 January 1975	TQ5504956856; 51°17′23″N 0°13′20″E		1243581	Upload Photo	Q26536249
Front Wall to the Vicarage	II	Church Street			16 January 1975	TQ5507056902; 51°17′25″N 0°13′21″E		1243567	Upload Photo	Q26536236
Marchants	II	Church Street			10 September 1954	TQ5503656788; 51°17′21″N 0°13′19″E		1243585	Upload Photo	Q26536253
The Croft	II	Church Street			10 September 1954	TQ5503756807; 51°17′21″N 0°13′19″E		1243499	Upload Photo	Q26536172
The Grey House	II	Church Street			10 September 1954	TQ5506456849; 51°17′23″N 0°13′21″E		1243498	Upload Photo	Q26536171
The House of Seal Boutique	II	Church Street			16 January 1975	TQ5504756734; 51°17′19″N 0°13′20″E		1243507	Upload Photo	Q26536180
The Vicarage Including Vicarage Cottage	II	Church Street			10 September 1954	TQ5509056900; 51°17′24″N 0°13′22″E		1272873	Upload Photo	Q26562676
Fawke Farmhouse	II	Fawke Common			10 September 1954	TQ5592953754; 51°15′42″N 0°14′00″E		1272941	Upload Photo	Q26562739
Fawke House Including the Cottage	II	Fawke Common			10 September 1954	TQ5587053720; 51°15′41″N 0°13′57″E		1243302	Upload Photo	Q26535986
Outbuilding to North West of Fawke Farmhouse	II	Fawke Common			16 January 1975	TQ5589953778; 51°15′43″N 0°13′59″E		1243489	Upload Photo	Q26536163
Small Barn to South West of Fawke Farmhouse	II	Fawke Common			16 January 1975	TQ5590853747; 51°15′42″N 0°13′59″E		1243480	Upload Photo	Q26536154
The Old Farmhouse	II	Fullers Hill			13 September 2001	TQ5608056789; 51°17′20″N 0°14′13″E		1389430	Upload Photo	Q26668864
Old School House Cottage	II	Godden Green			16 January 1975	TQ5531455066; 51°16′25″N 0°13′31″E		1243492	Upload Photo	Q26536166
Pond Cottages	II	1 and 2, Godden Green			16 January 1975	TQ5530655083; 51°16′25″N 0°13′30″E		1243491	Upload Photo	Q26536165
School House	II	Godden Green			16 January 1975	TQ5532855024; 51°16′24″N 0°13′31″E		1243493	Upload Photo	Q26536167
The Buck's Head Inn	II	Godden Green			16 January 1975	TQ5530255100; 51°16′26″N 0°13′30″E		1243490	Upload Photo	Q26536164
The Old Post House	II	Godden Green			16 January 1975	TQ5534755177; 51°16′28″N 0°13′33″E		1243495	Upload Photo	Q26536169
The Grove (now A School)	II	Grove Road			10 September 1954	TQ5587156065; 51°16′57″N 0°14′01″E		1243500	Upload Photo	Q26536173
Hall Place	II	Hall Hill, Hall Place			16 January 1975	TQ5599455322; 51°16′33″N 0°14′06″E		1272874	Upload Photo	Q26562677
14 and 16, High Street	II	14 and 16, High Street			16 January 1975	TQ5500856704; 51°17′18″N 0°13′17″E		1272788	Upload Photo	Q26562599
26 and 26a, High Street	II	26 and 26a, High Street			16 January 1975	TQ5507356696; 51°17′18″N 0°13′21″E		1272790	Upload Photo	Q26562601
27-31, High Street	II	27-31, High Street			16 January 1975	TQ5497456739; 51°17′19″N 0°13′16″E		1272803	Upload Photo	Q26562611
4 and 6, High Street	II	4 and 6, High Street			16 January 1975	TQ5494256714; 51°17′19″N 0°13′14″E		1272787	Upload Photo	Q26562598
41 and 43 High Street	II	41 and 43, High Street, TN15 0AW			16 January 1975	TQ5507656716; 51°17′18″N 0°13′21″E		1243502	Upload Photo	Q26536175
42 and 44, High Street	II	42 and 44, High Street			16 January 1975	TQ5511656681; 51°17′17″N 0°13′23″E		1272848	Upload Photo	Q26562654
45 High Street	II	45, High Street, TN15 0AW			16 January 1975	TQ5508556711; 51°17′18″N 0°13′21″E		1272806	Upload Photo	Q26562614
55 and 57, High Street	II	55 and 57, High Street			16 January 1975	TQ5511756700; 51°17′18″N 0°13′23″E		1272845	Upload Photo	Q26562651
59, High Street	II	59, High Street			16 January 1975	TQ5513056696; 51°17′18″N 0°13′24″E		1243503	Upload Photo	Q26536176
8, High Street	II	8, High Street			10 September 1954	TQ5495256710; 51°17′18″N 0°13′15″E		1272847	Upload Photo	Q26562653
Former Stables and Hayloft to Kentish Yeoman Public House	II	High Street			9 January 1987	TQ5495656704; 51°17′18″N 0°13′15″E		1272491	Upload Photo	Q26562324
Home Cottage the Homestead	II	High Street			16 January 1975	TQ5456356780; 51°17′21″N 0°12′55″E		1272846	Upload Photo	Q26562652
Keeper's Cottage	II	High Street			16 January 1975	TQ5473556746; 51°17′20″N 0°13′03″E		1243634	Upload Photo	Q26536301
Old Seal House Including Former House of Seal Hairdressers	II	High Street, TN15 0AW			10 September 1954	TQ5505256724; 51°17′19″N 0°13′20″E		1243501	Upload Photo	Q26536174
Retaining Wall in Front of No 59	II	High Street			16 January 1975	TQ5512856690; 51°17′18″N 0°13′24″E		1243633	Upload Photo	Q26536300
The Crown Inn	II	High Street			16 January 1975	TQ5502756701; 51°17′18″N 0°13′18″E		1243506	Upload Photo	Q26536179
The Kentish Yeoman Public House	II	High Street			16 January 1975	TQ5497556708; 51°17′18″N 0°13′16″E		1243505	Upload Photo	Q26536178
York House	II	37, High Street, TN15 0AW			10 September 1954	TQ5506156718; 51°17′19″N 0°13′20″E		1243632	Upload Photo	Q26536299
7, Park Lane	II	7, Park Lane			16 January 1975	TQ5507356691; 51°17′18″N 0°13′21″E		1272849	Upload Photo	Q26562655
St Etheldreda's	II	Park Lane			16 January 1975	TQ5507356684; 51°17′17″N 0°13′21″E		1243508	Upload Photo	Q26536181
1-3, School Lane	II	1-3, School Lane			16 January 1975	TQ5490756885; 51°17′24″N 0°13′13″E		1243511	Upload Photo	Q26536184
4 and 5, School Lane	II	4 and 5, School Lane			16 January 1975	TQ5490356900; 51°17′25″N 0°13′12″E		1243512	Upload Photo	Q26536185
Camden House	II	School Lane			16 January 1975	TQ5488656819; 51°17′22″N 0°13′11″E		1243510	Upload Photo	Q26536183
Camden Terrace	II	1 and 2, School Lane			16 January 1975	TQ5488656792; 51°17′21″N 0°13′11″E		1272850	Upload Photo	Q26562656
Appletree Cottage School	II	Seal Chart			16 January 1975	TQ5709156597; 51°17′13″N 0°15′05″E		1243518	Upload Photo	Q26536190
Bank Top Cottage	II	Seal Chart			16 January 1975	TQ5757356555; 51°17′11″N 0°15′30″E		1272851	Upload Photo	Q26562657
Bennet's Cottage North Bennet's Cottage South	II	Seal Chart			16 January 1975	TQ5745156187; 51°16′59″N 0°15′23″E		1272783	Upload Photo	Q26562595
Chart Cottage	II	Seal Chart			16 January 1975	TQ5694056611; 51°17′13″N 0°14′57″E		1243664	Upload Photo	Q26536331
Cheeseman's Cottage	II	Seal Chart			16 January 1975	TQ5747656244; 51°17′01″N 0°15′24″E		1243519	Upload Photo	Q26536191
Crockers	II	Seal Chart			10 September 1954	TQ5707256576; 51°17′12″N 0°15′04″E		1272780	Upload Photo	Q26562592
Waterden Cottage	II	Seal Chart			13 November 1989	TQ5614556572; 51°17′13″N 0°14′16″E		1272476	Upload Photo	Q26562309
Oast Building at Foxbury Farm	II	Stone Street			16 January 1975	TQ5745454756; 51°16′13″N 0°15′21″E		1243516	Upload Photo	Q26536188
Pond Farmhouse (pond Lane)	II	Stone Street			16 January 1975	TQ5736254675; 51°16′10″N 0°15′16″E		1243517	Upload Photo	Q26536189
Stone Street Farm Cottage	II	Stone Street			16 January 1975	TQ5733854767; 51°16′13″N 0°15′15″E		1243515	Upload Photo	Q26536187
Garden Walls Surrounding Stonepitts Manor House	II	Stonepitts			10 September 1954	TQ5686057036; 51°17′27″N 0°14′54″E		1243514	Upload Photo	Q26536186
Stonepitts Manor House	II*	Stonepitts			10 September 1954	TQ5686557051; 51°17′28″N 0°14′54″E		1243513	Upload Photo	Q17545595
Absalom's Farmhouse	II	Underriver			10 September 1954	TQ5628652451; 51°14′59″N 0°14′17″E		1272852	Upload Photo	Q26562658
Barn and Outbuilding to West of St Julian's Farmhouse	II	Underriver, St Julian's Farm			16 January 1975	TQ5511951801; 51°14′39″N 0°13′16″E		1243530	Upload Photo	Q26536202
Barn to North of Outbuilding to North of Underriver House	II	Underriver			12 December 1980	TQ5666752186; 51°14′50″N 0°14′36″E		1244184	Upload Photo	Q26536816
Black Charles	II*	Underriver			10 September 1954	TQ5552252410; 51°14′59″N 0°13′37″E		1243688	Black Charles More images	Q17545599
Brook Cottage	II	Underriver			10 September 1954	TQ5583751525; 51°14′30″N 0°13′52″E		1272856	Upload Photo	Q26562662
Catts Cottage	II*	Underriver			10 September 1954	TQ5569452114; 51°14′49″N 0°13′46″E		1272772	Upload Photo	Q17545837
Church of St Margaret	II	Underriver			16 January 1975	TQ5569051990; 51°14′45″N 0°13′45″E		1272855	Church of St Margaret More images	Q26562661
Front Boundary Wall to Grounds of Under River House	II	Underriver			16 January 1975	TQ5659252143; 51°14′49″N 0°14′32″E		1272854	Upload Photo	Q26562660
Garden Wall in Front of Black Charles	II	Underriver			16 January 1975	TQ5552152391; 51°14′58″N 0°13′37″E		1243523	Upload Photo	Q26536195
Garden Walls to South West of Absalom's Farmhouse	II	Underriver			16 January 1975	TQ5624552416; 51°14′58″N 0°14′15″E		1243520	Upload Photo	Q26536192
Granary Adjoining the Threshing Barn at Rumshed Farm	II	Underriver			19 February 1990	TQ5510551814; 51°14′40″N 0°13′15″E		1248581	Upload Photo	Q26540785
Granary and Former Cowshed to South West of Absalom's Farmhouse	II	Underriver			16 January 1975	TQ5625252441; 51°14′59″N 0°14′15″E		1243678	Upload Photo	Q26536345
Green Lane Cottage	II	Underriver			16 January 1975	TQ5594751860; 51°14′41″N 0°13′58″E		1243697	Upload Photo	Q26536363
High House	II	Underriver			16 January 1975	TQ5565351916; 51°14′43″N 0°13′43″E		1243525	Upload Photo	Q26536197
Kettleshill Farmhouse	II	Underriver			2 April 1992	TQ5536552604; 51°15′05″N 0°13′30″E		1244280	Upload Photo	Q26536909
Milking Parlour South West of Rumshed Farmhouse	II	Underriver			19 February 1990	TQ5510351824; 51°14′40″N 0°13′15″E		1070380	Upload Photo	Q26324208
Oast Range to West of Stable Yard of Absalom's Farmhouse	II	Underriver			16 January 1975	TQ5630452482; 51°15′00″N 0°14′18″E		1243521	Upload Photo	Q26536193
Outbuilding to North of Under River House	II	Underriver			16 January 1975	TQ5666152215; 51°14′51″N 0°14′36″E		1243685	Upload Photo	Q26536352
Rumshott Manor	II	Underriver			16 January 1975	TQ5501852586; 51°15′05″N 0°13′12″E		1272859	Upload Photo	Q26562664
St Julian's Farmhouse	II	Underriver, St Julian's Farm			16 January 1975	TQ5514651822; 51°14′40″N 0°13′17″E		1272753	Upload Photo	Q26562567
St Julian's Including Adjoining Conservatory	II	Underriver, St Julian's			16 January 1975	TQ5485452589; 51°15′05″N 0°13′03″E		1243529	Upload Photo	Q26536201
Stable Building Ot East of Under River House	II	Underriver			16 January 1975	TQ5667952165; 51°14′50″N 0°14′37″E		1243522	Upload Photo	Q26536194
Stable Yard and Stables to North East of Absalom's Farmhouse	II	Underriver			16 January 1975	TQ5632252473; 51°15′00″N 0°14′19″E		1243681	Upload Photo	Q26536348
The Forge Including North Forge	II	Underriver			16 January 1975	TQ5566752212; 51°14′52″N 0°13′44″E		1243524	Upload Photo	Q26536196
Threshing Barn at Rumshed Farm	II	Underriver			16 January 1975	TQ5511651806; 51°14′40″N 0°13′15″E		1363179	Upload Photo	Q26645018
Tumbling Bay	II	Underriver			16 January 1975	TQ5623551077; 51°14′15″N 0°14′12″E		1272773	Upload Photo	Q26562585
Under River House	II	Underriver			10 September 1954	TQ5664852144; 51°14′49″N 0°14′35″E		1243683	Upload Photo	Q26536350
Wall to North East of Under River House	II	Underriver			16 January 1975	TQ5665652165; 51°14′50″N 0°14′35″E		1272853	Upload Photo	Q26562659
Former Dorton House (school for the Blind)	II	Wildernesse Avenue, TN15 0EA			16 January 1975	TQ5484056379; 51°17′08″N 0°13′08″E		1243509	Upload Photo	Q26536182
Seal Laundry	II	Wildernesse Avenue			23 January 1991	TQ5494856646; 51°17′16″N 0°13′14″E		1272452	Upload Photo	Q26562285

== See also ==
- Grade I listed buildings in Kent
- Grade II* listed buildings in Kent

== Sources ==
- Newman, John (2012) [1969], Kent: West and the Weald, The Buildings of England, New Haven and London: Yale University Press, ISBN 978-0-300-18509-6
