= Dorothy Hewer =

English herb farmer (1888–1948)

- Born: 16 March 1888; South Hornsey
- Died: 1 March 1948 (aged 59); Seal

Dorothy Gertrude Hewer (16 March 1888 – 1 March 1948) was an English herb farmer, herbalist, and writer.

== Life ==
Hewer was born in 1888 South Hornsey. Her parents were Annie Martha (née Everard) and Joseph Langton Hewer. Her father was a doctor and she was educated at North London Collegiate School and Bedford College, London. She graduated in 1911.

Maud Grieve became her friend and she had done leading work in growing herbs during the Great War when the UK's traditional sources were difficult to access. Grieve had been the president of The British Guild of Herb Growers and in time she would publish A Modern Herbal in 1931.

Maud Grieve's older husband's health became a concern and she decided to move away from herb production and training. She gave most of her stock to Hewer. Hewer had started her herbal farm three years before near the Kentish village of Seal where she became known for her "Seal" lavender. Hewer had been inspired by Grieve and by the work of the gardening writer Eleanour Sinclair Rohde. Grieve had closed her training school and she encouraged Hewer to take on a few women helpers. These helpers or trainees said that they were made very hard by Hewer. One of these was Margaret Brownlow.

The herb farm's crop of culinary and medical herbs supplied Hewer's mail order business and a shop she bought in North Audley Street, London. The sale volumes increased during the war and she published her book on herbology in 1941 titled Practical Herb Growing. Margaret Brownlow returned to work for her in 1943 and after Hewer died in 1948 in Seal, Kent, Brownlow took over the Herb Farm.
