= Edward Moss (cricketer) =

English cricketer and Royal Air Force Volunteer Reserve officer

Personal information
- Full name: Edward Henry Moss
- Born: 25 May 1911; Godden Green, Kent, England
- Died: 31 March 1944 (aged 32); Rimbach, Free State of Prussia, Nazi Germany
- Batting: Right-handed
- Relatives: Robert Moss (brother)

Domestic team information
- Years: Team
- 1933–1934: Oxford University
- 1938–1939: Berkshire

Career statistics
Competition	First-class
Matches	5
Runs scored	206
Batting average	20.60
100s/50s	–/1
Top score	50
Catches/stumpings	2/–
- Source: Cricinfo, 14 February 2019

Edward Henry Moss DFC (25 May 1911 — 31 March 1944) was an English first-class cricketer and Royal Air Force Volunteer Reserve officer. Moss studied modern history at the University of Oxford, where he played first-class cricket for Oxford University Cricket Club. Initially serving in the Second World War with the Wiltshire Regiment, he transferred Royal Air Force Volunteer Reserve in 1941, where he would spend the remainder of the war. He was killed during a bombing mission over Germany in 1944.

== Early life ==
The son of William Henry Moss and his wife, Rose Winifred Moss, he was born at Godden Green in Kent. He was initially educated at Hawtreys prep school, before attending Malvern College, where he captained the college cricket team in 1930. From there he went up to Trinity College, Oxford. While at Trinity he made his debut in first-class cricket for Oxford University against Leicestershire in 1933 at Oxford, with the remainder of his three first-class appearances for Oxford coming in the following year, which also included a first-class match for HDG Leveson-Gower's XI against Oxford University. His four matches for Oxford yielded 170 runs at an average of 21.25, with a high score of 50. He narrowly missed out on his cricket blue. His other sporting interest at Oxford was golf, with him representing the university for four years, including two as captain. He did manage to gain a blue in a golf.

He graduated from Oxford with second-class honours in modern history, and found employment as a schoolmaster at Radley College. He was appointed a second lieutenant with the Radley College contingent of the Officers' Training Corps in October 1936. Moss initially played minor counties cricket for Kent Second XI in the early 1930s, but later appeared for Berkshire in minor counties cricket, making five appearances in the Minor Counties Championship in 1938–1939.

== World War II service ==
Moss initially served during the Second World War with the Wiltshire Regiment, where he gained the rank of lieutenant in June 1940. He relinquished his commission in September 1941, when he transferred to the Royal Air Force Volunteer Reserve. He served with No. 61 Squadron RAF, initially with the rank of probationary pilot officer, with confirmation of his position confirmed in September 1942. He was promoted to the war substantive rank of flying officer in August 1942. After training as a pilot, he spent sometime as an instructor, before becoming an operational Lancaster pilot. He was promoted to the rank of acting squadron leader in July 1943.

In March 1944, Moss was awarded the Distinguished Flying Cross (DFC) for "gallantry displayed in flying operations against the enemy". Moss had carried out five bombing sorties on Berlin, including on one occasion when his bomber was severely damaged while returning from a bombing run over Berlin after being hit by anti-aircraft fire, with Moss returning the bomber safely to England. The Gazette cited his "great leadership, skill and courage" as "setting a fine example to all." A week after being awarded the DFC, Moss was killed when his bomber was shot down over Rimbach in Germany. After the war his body was buried at the Hannover War Cemetery. His brother, Robert, was also a first-class cricketer.
