= Dove's dung =

Biblical commodity

Dove's dung (Hebrew: חרייונים, romanized: ḥărê yōnîm; in Septuagint κόπρου περιστερῶν, koprou peristelōn) is named as a commodity (possibly a food) whose price had escalated during a famine in Samaria reported in 2 Kings 6:25, when the city was besieged by the Syrian (Aram-Damascus) armies. The narrative describes how, during the siege of Samaria by Syrian king Ben-Hadad, a quarter of a kab (i.e. about one pint or 600 mL) of 'dove's dung' was sold for five shekels of silver (about 55 grams or nearly two troy ounces). At the same time, a donkey’s head was sold for eighty shekels of silver (nearly one kilogram or two troy pounds).

There has been considerable debate about what these words actually refer to. English Bible translations have varied, with the King James Version and the English Standard Version retaining the phrase 'dove's dung', whereas the New International Version reads 'seed pods' and the New Jerusalem Bible 'wild onions'.

The Geneva Bible suggests that the dung was used as a fuel for fire. Jewish historian Josephus suggested that dove's dung could have been used as a salt substitute. An alternative view is that 'dove's dung' was a popular name for some other food, such as falafel.

A third option, followed by the translations of NEB ("locust beans") and NJPS ("carob pods") is based on Akkadian evidence: in a lexical list of plants, ḫalla/ze summāti, "dove's dung," is defined as zēr ašāgi = ḫarūbu, "the seed of the (false) carob."
