= Seal, Kent =

Village in Kent, England

Coordinates: 51.2882°N 0.2223°E

Seal
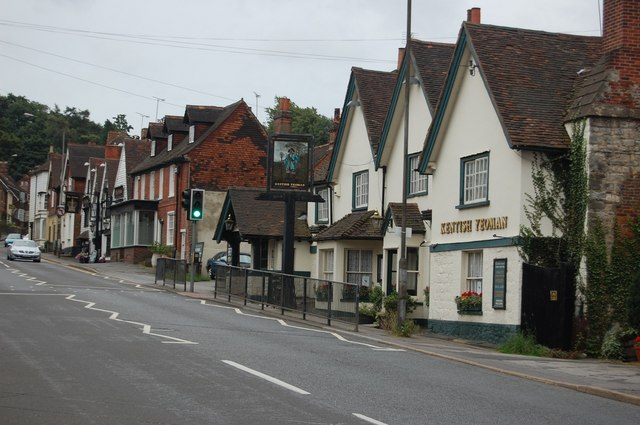
- A view along Seal High Street

- Location within Kent
- Population: 2,556 (2011 Census)
- OS grid reference: TQ549567
- Civil parish: Seal
- District: Sevenoaks
- Shire county: Kent
- Region: South East
- Country: England
- Sovereign state: United Kingdom
- Post town: SEVENOAKS
- Postcode district: TN15
- Dialling code: 01732
- Police: Kent
- Fire: Kent
- Ambulance: South East Coast
- UK Parliament: Sevenoaks

Seal is a village and civil parish in the Sevenoaks district of Kent, England. The parish is located in the valley between the North Downs and the Greensand ridge, and to the north-east of the town of Sevenoaks in West Kent.

== History ==
In early documents the name of the village is often given as 'Sele', 'Sale', 'Zela' or 'La Sela'. Until recently it was thought to come from the French word 'salle' meaning a hall but there is no evidence to support this. Etymologists suggest that the name of the village could have come from the Anglo-Saxon word 'sole' or 'sol' meaning a 'muddy slough, wallowing place' or a 'muddy pond that overflows'. Seal still has a pond at the fork at the bottom of Park Lane which tends to overflow at the present day. Another possibility is Anglo-Saxon sēale = "group of sallow trees".

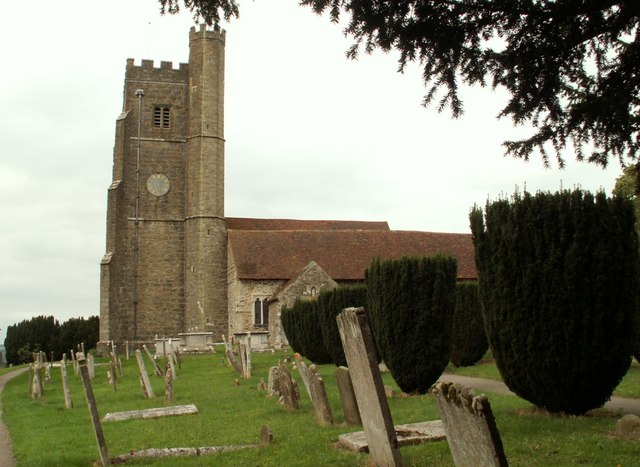
St Peter and St Paul's church

Seal's church, the oldest parts of which date from the 13th Century, is dedicated to St Peter and St Paul and is a grade I listed building. The ecclesiastical parish only became separate from Kemsing in 1874, although there may well have been a Saxon church on the site of the present building. Visitors to the church, which is normally open during the day, can pick up a free guide leaflet pointing out features of interest. There are more details on the church website, and a page for family historians with some records of burials and baptisms at the church (not complete) and information about where to find others.

Today, the ecclesiastical parish boundary meanders north of the village along the Guzzlebrook stream and extends south through the village, bounded on the eastern side by Watery Lane, Seal Chart, and Ash Platt Road to the west. It follows the course of Park Lane, Chance Wood, Grove Road, through Godden Green, bounded at the south by the junction of Bitchet Green Road at Fawke Common.

Seal was recorded in the Domesday Book in 1086.

== Geography ==
The main village lies on the A25 road and has merged with the built-up area of Sevenoaks.

The parish includes the separate smaller settlements of Underriver, Stone Street, Godden Green and Bitchet Green.

== Village facilities ==
Seal retains a village library which is operated by Kent County Council; the library offers telecottage services.

There are three community halls in the village; Seal Pavilion, Seal Village Hall, and Seal Church Hall.

Along the High Street there are a variety of shops, businesses, and restaurants.

There is only one pub now in Seal. "The Five Bells" in Church Street is managed by Shepherd Neame Brewery and is open every day. The name for the pub comes from the fact that there were originally five bells installed in the belltower at St Peter & St Paul's Church, given its close proximity to the church (there are now six bells installed in the belltower).

Seal Recreation Ground (locally known as the Rec) lies to the west of the village and offers public amenity space for sports and leisure activities. During the summer months various events are held on the Rec, such as the SealFest Music Festival day and Big Lunch events.

Seal Village has a stretch of land running alongside the Rec which was left in trust to the villagers for allotment gardens that are also used by surrounding villagers.

== Public transport ==
There are several bus routes that connect Seal with surrounding villages and towns. The Arriva 308 bus connects the village with Sevenoaks station, Bat & Ball, Borough Green, Meopham and Gravesend. The Arriva 452 bus connects the village with Kemsing, Sevenoaks station, and Dunton Green. An extended service of this route is operated by Go Coach on Saturdays. There are also some infrequent bus services, such as the Go Coach 404, connecting Seal to Shipbourne, Plaxtol, Ivy Hatch (for Ightham Mote), Stone Street, Kippington, Ide Hill, and Edenbridge. There are currently no buses serving Seal on Sundays or public holidays, also there are no direct buses to Otford. The closest railway stations to the village are at Bat & Ball and Kemsing.

== Notable people ==
- Emma Corrin (born 1995), actor who portrayed Diana, Princess of Wales in The Crown
- David Fursdon (born 1952), cricketer and the current Lord-Lieutenant of Devon
- Dorothy Hewer (1888–1948) opened her herb farm here where she developed "Seal" Lavender. The farm was later (1948) taken over by Margaret Brownlow (1916–1968).

== See also ==
- Listed buildings in Seal, Kent
