= Maud Grieve =

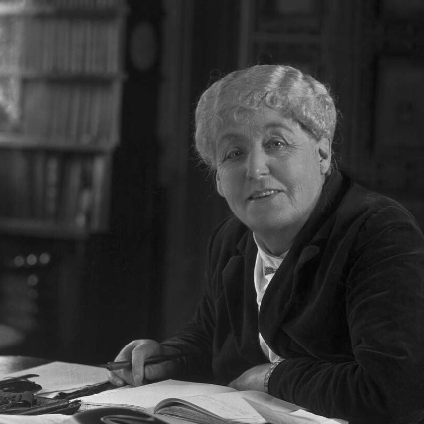
Maud Grieve in 1928

Sophie Emma Magdalene Grieve (née Law; 4 May 1858 – 21 December 1941), also known as Maud, Margaret, Maude or Mrs. Grieve, was the principal and founder of The Whins Medicinal and Commercial Herb School and Farm at Chalfont St. Peter in Buckinghamshire, England.

Grieve was a Fellow of the Royal Horticultural Society, President of the British Guild of Herb Growers, and Fellow of the British Science Guild. She is best known for her 1931 book, A Modern Herbal.

== Life ==
Grieve was born in 1858 at 75 Upper Street, Islington, London. Grieve's father died in 1864 and she grew up in the care of relatives in Beckenham, London, where she received a good education. Following the death of her uncle in 1879, she was left an inheritance of a £1000. There is no record of her whereabouts or activities during the following four years, however by 1883 she had travelled to India, where she met and married William Grieve (1846–1929) originally from Edinburgh. He was manager of the Bally Paper Mill near Calcutta from 1878 to 1894. Grieve was involved with charitable causes and had connections with a medical mission during her time in Calcutta.

She and her husband lived in India until his retirement. Although William retired from the paper mills in 1894, the couple only returned to settle permanently back in England in the beginning of the 1900s. They lived in a number of places including Hayes in Middlesex and Chartridge in Buckinghamshire, before moving to the house that William had designed at Chalfont Common, Chalfont St Peter around 1906. They named it The Whins after the yellow gorse that grew in the neighbourhood.

She lived in Chalfont St Peter from 1906 to 1938. She initially created a perennial nursery on the grounds of the house, but at the outbreak of the First World War she turned the nursery into a herb farm to address the shortage of supplies of vital medicinal plants. In 1914 the Board of Agriculture published The Cultivation & Collection of Medicinal plants in England to deal with the shortage of drug supplies in Britain during the war. This was due to the disruption of the trade routes, most of the plants used were imported from continental Europe before the war. The drugs required were: henbane, foxglove, deadly nightshade and monkshood. The National Herb Growing Association was set up by a group of educated women under the auspices of the Women's Farm & Garden Union.

She was a founder member of the short lived National Herb Growing Association (1914–17) and later president of The British Guild of Herb Growers (est. 1918.) During the war she also started The Whins Medicinal and Commercial Herb School. After the war she continued promoting the benefits of herbs, writing over three hundred pamphlets on individual plants. These were edited by Hilda Leyel and were the main source of information in what has become A Modern Herbal, which was published 1931. As the original pamphlets were only about English plants, Mrs. Leyel added American herbs to Mrs. Grieve's pamphlets and checked and edited the whole work, expanding it to eight hundred plants.

In 1929 her husband's health became a concern and she decided to move away from herb production and training. She gave most of her stock to Dorothy Hewer. Hewer had started her herbal farm three years before near the Kentish village of Seal where she became known for her "Seal" lavender. Hewer had been inspired by Grieve and by the work of the gardening writer Eleanour Sinclair Rohde. Grieve had closed her training school and she encouraged Hewer to take on a few women helpers.

Grieve wrote Culinary herbs and condiments and Roses and pot pourri: Plants of sweet scent and their employment in perfumery.

== Death and legacy ==
She died in 1941 in Royston, Hertfordshire. Her collections and pamphlets are held by the Special Collections Division of the Edinburgh University. Some of her correspondence letters are held in the Kew Herbarium library and others are in a private collection. Only a couple of her art works survive, an oil painting of an Indian street scene which she submitted to the 1884 Calcutta International Exhibition and the illustrations of croton plants, which are now in the Herbarium Library, Kew.
