= Godden Green =

Hamlet in Kent, England

Coordinates: 51.272400°N 0.223330°E

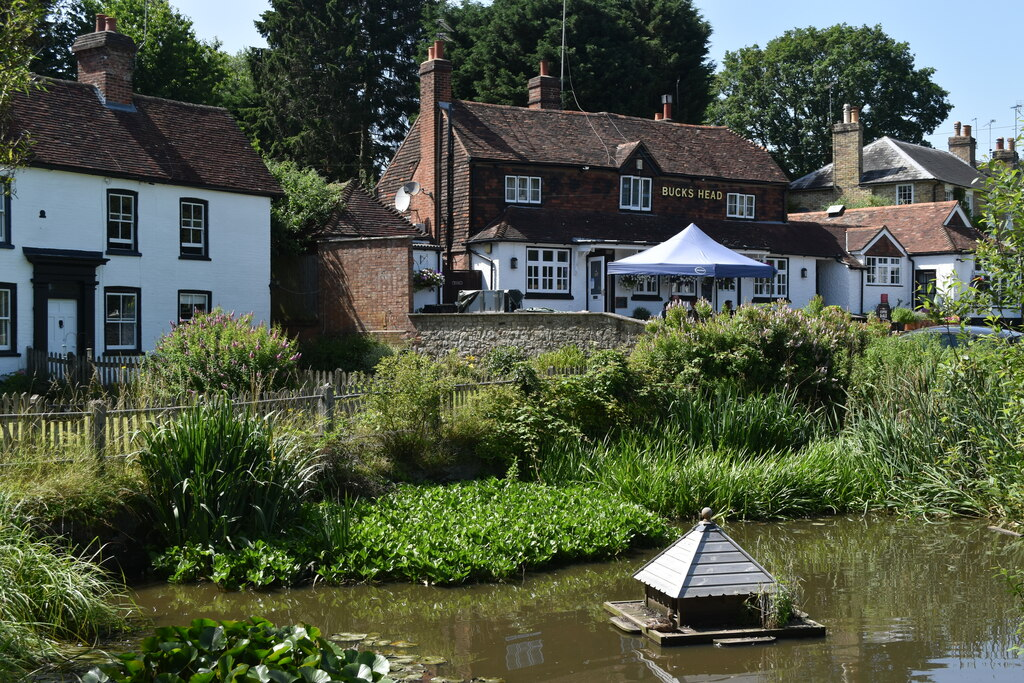
- Pond and pub

- Location within Kent
- Civil parish: Seal
- District: Sevenoaks
- Shire county: Kent
- Region: South East
- Country: England
- Sovereign state: United Kingdom
- Post town: SEVENOAKS
- Postcode district: TN15
- Police: Kent
- Fire: Kent
- Ambulance: South East Coast
- UK Parliament: Sevenoaks

Godden Green is a hamlet 1 mile (2 km) east of Sevenoaks in Kent, England. It is within the civil parish of Seal, in Sevenoaks District, on the eastern edge of Knole Park. There is a large green, and a Shepherd Neame public house, the Buck's Head. The village is in the ecclesiastical parish of St Peter and St Paul, Seal, the parish extends southward and is bounded by Bitchet Green Road at Fawke Common.

== History ==
Historically, many local residents were employees of the Knole Estate.

== Notable residents ==
Charles Robert Ashbee, who was a considerable designer and prime mover in the Arts and Crafts Movement, lived in the village with his wife, Janet at Stormont Court, now Godden Green House and adjacent properties. He was the church architect for some time at St Peter & St Paul's Seal and designed the internal belltower screen at the west end and the 'new' rood screen. The family grave is in Seal church yard.

== Local elections ==
Godden Green lies within the Kent county electoral division of Sevenoaks East, and the Sevenoaks district ward of Seal & Weald. It is represented by the councillors of Seal Parish Council.

== Local services ==
Godden Green is the location of a private psychiatric hospital run by Cygnet Health Care. Also located in Godden Green is Sevenoaks Preparatory School, set within extensive recreational grounds.
